= List of settlements on the Lake Skadar shoreline =

This is a list of settlements located on the coastline of Lake Skadar, also known as Lake Scutari, Lake Shkodër and Lake Shkodra. Lake Skadar is the largest lake in the Balkan peninsula. It is located between the countries of Montenegro and Albania. Settlements are automatically listed west to east. The table can be reorganised based on country, municipality name, population, and the language(s) spoken in the settlement. Major settlements (population of 1000 or greater) are highlighted in bold.

Settlement name	Country	Other names	Municipality	Population	Date, Source	Language(s)
Rijeka Crnojevića	Montenegro	Ријека Црнојевића	Old Royal Capital Cetinje	300		Montenegrin
Šinđon	Montenegro	Шинђон	Old Royal Capital Cetinje			Montenegrin
Poseljani	Montenegro	Посељани	Bar Municipality			Montenegrin
Riječani	Montenegro		Old Royal Capital Cetinje	14	2011 census	Montenegrin
Komarno	Montenegro		Bar Municipality	15	2011 census	Montenegrin
Kruševica	Montenegro		Bar Municipality			Montenegrin
Virpazar	Montenegro	Вирпазар	Bar Municipality	277	2011 census	Montenegrin, Serbian, Albanian
Drušići	Montenegro	Друшићи	Old Royal Capital Cetinje	73	2011 census	Montenegrin, Serbian
Prevlaka	Montenegro		Old Royal Capital Cetinje			Montenegrin
Godinje	Montenegro	Годиње	Bar Municipality	49	2011 census	Serbian, Montenegrin
Vranjina	Montenegro	Vrnjina, Vraninë, Vranina	Podgorica Capital City	218	2011 census	Montenegrin, Serbian, Albanian
Dodoši	Montenegro	Додоши	Old Royal Capital Cetinje	43	2011 census	Montenegrin, Serbian
Žabljak Crnojevića	Montenegro		Podgorica Capital City			Montenegrin
Marstijepovići	Montenegro		Bar Municipality			Montenegrin
Karanikići	Montenegro	Karanikici	Bar Municipality	6	2011 census	Montenegrin
Krnjice	Montenegro	Крњице	Bar Municipality	18	2011 census	Montenegrin, Serbian
Donji Murići	Montenegro	Muriqi i Poshtëm, Donji Murici	Bar Municipality	101	2011 census	Albanian
Šestani	Montenegro	Sestani	Bar Municipality			Montenegrin
Dračevica	Montenegro	Драчевица, Dracevica	Bar Municipality			Serbian, Montenegrin
Đuravci	Montenegro		Bar Municipality	11	2003 census	Montenegrin
Besa	Montenegro	Besë	Bar Municipality	41	2011 census	Albanian
Bobovište	Montenegro	Boboshti	Bar Municipality	180	2011 census	Albanian
Sjerci	Montenegro		Bar Municipality			Albanian
Ckla	Montenegro	Skje	Ulcinj Municipality	83	2011 census	Albanian
Kamicë-Flakë	Albania	Kamica-Flaka, Kamenicë	Malësi e Madhe	957	2010	Albanian
Božaj	Montenegro	Bozhaj	Podgorica Capital City			Albanian
Stërbeq	Albania	Stërheq	Malësi e Madhe	636	2010	Albanian
Jubicë	Albania	Jubica	Malësi e Madhe	572	2010	Albanian
Kasani	Albania		Malësi e Madhe			Albanian
Gashaj	Albania		Malësi e Madhe			Albanian
Zogaj	Albania		Shkodër Municipality			Albanian
Rogomi	Albania		Malësi e Madhe			Albanian
Kalldrun	Albania	Kaldrun	Malësi e Madhe	554	2010	Albanian
Mokseti	Albania		Malësi e Madhe			Albanian
Skajc	Albania		Malësi e Madhe			Albanian
Culaj	Albania		Malësi e Madhe			Albanian
Vukpalaj	Albania	Vukpalaj-Bajzë, Vukpalaj-Bajza	Malësi e Madhe	768	2010	Albanian
Han i Hotit	Albania		Malësi e Madhe			Albanian
**Koplik**	Albania	Koplik i Poshtëm	Malësi e Madhe	3,734	2011 census	Albanian
Lulashpepaj	Albania		Malësi e Madhe			Albanian
Dobër	Albania	Dobre	Malësi e Madhe	693	2010	Albanian
Shiroka	Albania	Shirokë	Shkodër Municipality			Albanian
Kçar i Poshtëm	Albania		Malësi e Madhe			Albanian
Zus	Albania		Shkodër Municipality			Albanian
Grilë	Albania	Grila, Grilj	Shkodër Municipality			Montenegrin, Albanian
Omaraj	Albania		Malësi e Madhe			Albanian
Kata-Lina	Albania		Shkodër Municipality			Albanian
Bahçallëk	Albania		Shkodër Municipality			Albanian
Qafë-Gradë	Albania	Qafë	Shkodër Municipality			Albanian
Boriç	Albania	Boriç i Vogël, Stari Borič, Mali Borič	Malësi e Madhe	650	1990	Montenegrin, Albanian
Kiras	Albania		Shkodër Municipality			Albanian
**Shkodër**	Albania	Shkodra, Scutari	Shkodër Municipality	135,612	2011 census	Albanian
Xhabiaj	Albania		Shkodër Municipality			Albanian
Boriç i Madh	Albania	Boriç i Madhë, Veliki Borič, Novi Borič	Malësi e Madhe	950	1990	Montenegrin, Albanian
Shtoj i Vjetër	Albania		Malësi e Madhe			Albanian
Shtoj i Ri	Albania		Malësi e Madhe			Albanian
Ajasem	Albania		Shkodër Municipality			Albanian
Tepe	Albania		Shkodër Municipality			Albanian
