= Kastrati (tribe) =

Region in Albania; historic Albanian tribe

Coordinates: 42°17′N 19°26′E

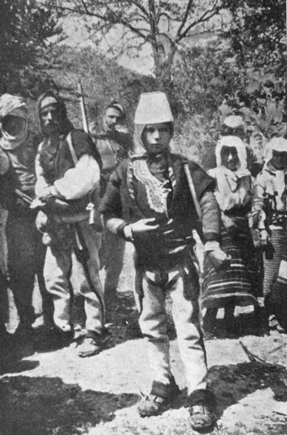
"Boy of Kastrati", 1909.

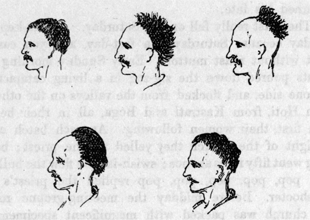
Head-shaves in Kastrati and Shkreli, drawing made by Edith Durham

Kastrati is a historical Albanian tribe (fis) and region in northwestern Albania. It is part of the Malësia region. Administratively, the region is located in the Malësi e Madhe District, part of the Kastrati municipal unit. The centre of Kastrati is the village of Bajzë. The Kastrati tribe is known to follow the Kanuni i Malësisë së Madhe, a variant of the Kanun. They are proverbally known for their pride - Kastrati Krenar.

== Etymology ==
The term 'Kastrati' is said to be related to the Latin word castrum, which is a Roman camp fortification. The tribe's name contains the Albanian suffix -at, widely used to form toponyms and tribal names from personal names and surnames. The clan's centre was once at the ruins of a Roman castra on the Scutari-Orosh road.

== Geography ==
Kastrati tribal territory is located in northwestern Albania, near the border between Albania and Montenegro and on the eastern bank of Lake Shkodra, stretching from Bajzë in the west Mount Veleçik (1,725m altitude) in the east. The region forms the Kastrat municipal unit. It borders Hoti tribal territory to the north, the town of Koplik and the Shkreli tribe to the south and the Kelmendi tribe to the northeast. Kastrati tribal territory is divided into two sub-regions: the mountainous Katund i Kastratit and the lowland Bajzë area. The settlement of Bajzë itself is the center of Kastrati. This division reflects the organization of Kastrati's economy, which is a combination of agricultural and livestock activities. All families of Kastrati have property in both areas. Bajzë includes: Aliaj, Jeran, Gradec, Vukpalaj, Ivanaj, Pjetroshan and Katund i Kastratit includes: Goraj, Budishë and Bratosh.

In the Ottoman period, some villages like Kamicë-Flakë were put under the bajrak (military administrative unit) of Kastrati, but are not part of this region. They are related to the wider Vraka area in terms of ethnographic ties. Thus, today Kamica is not placed in the Kastrati municipal unit, but in Qendër.

== Origins and Legends ==
The Kastrati tribe is a traditional fis in the sense that it is a community descended from a single male ancestor, and thus consisted of a single bajrak. The Kastrati trace their origins to a certain Dedli (also Detli, Dedali, Detal, Detali and Detal Bratoshi) who lived at the end of the sixteenth century. In one folkloric story, Dedli hailed from the Ndrekalorë of the Kuçi tribe(origin from berisha) - both of which are originally Albanian tribes that eventually assimilated into a Slavic identity. Prior to the arrival of Dedli, the Old Kastrati lived in the region.

Many legends exist in regards to the founding and expansion of the Kastrati, all of which are based around their forefather, Dedli. Dedli had six sons with two wives - three of them were called Pal, Jer and Gor, which correspond to the names of the villages Palaj, Jeran and Goraj in Kastrati territory. A folkloric legend states that the father and his family originally lived in a cave (specifically Shpella e Bagtive) on Mount Veliçik, and that when his family grew, the Old Kastrati began a rivalry with Dedli. In order to test Dedli, they invited the man to dinner but gave him a seat far from the dinner table to observe his reaction, and to their surprise Dedli's six sons escorted their father to the dinner table and served him as tradition would have it. The elder of the Old Kastrati was that impressed by their upbringing that he asked to be the godfather of Dedli's grandson and thereby bring peace to the two sides. Another version of the legend states that, if the sons moved up to the table, they would be considered submissive; rather, Dedli's sons pulled the table towards them and began to eat. As a result, most of the Old Kastrati fled the village. Another legend states that Detal Bratoshi had arrived from the Kuçi region with his 7 sons - Nar/Ndoc, Pal, Ivan, Jer, Gor, Gjon and Ali - and it follows a similar narrative to that of the dinner table. Nonetheless, these tales describe the Kastrati as a tribe fond of raiding neighbouring regions and in constant conflict with the Triepshi tribe as well as the Ottoman Empire. Ull Vuka, a great-grandson of Detal, was said to have killed an Ottoman Pasha. In another legend, Dedli's wife and daughter reported to Dedli that the leader of the Old Kastrati had attempted to commit adultery with them, so Dedli swore revenge; he and his sons battled and defeated the Old Kastrati. Yet another legend claims that after Dedli defeated the Old Kastrati, he submitted to the local Pasha and was thereby promised as much land as he could ride over in a day, hence forming the Kastrati tribal borders. Nonetheless, what is known is that the Kastrati tribe held assemblies (Kuvend) in the village of Bajzë, specifically within the Frashni Cave (Shpella e Frashnit); each assembly was attended by the bajraktar (flagbearer; tribe leader), four chiefs (Krena), 24 elders and a man from each house. Dedli's arrival is estimated to have taken place around 1600-1640CE. They are proverbally known for their pride - Kastrati Krenar.

== History ==
=== Attestations ===
In 1416, a settlement by the name of Kastrati appeared with a total of 7 houses. It would appear again in 1614 as a community of 50 houses with 130 men-at-arms commanded by Prenk Bitti, but a certain Prenk Kastrati was also cited as the Chief of Rapsha (which belonged to the Hoti tribe) at the same time. They are again mentioned in 1621, 1634 with 60 houses and 660 inhabitants, and again in 1653 with a population of 660. In 1671, there were 75 houses with 660 inhabitants, and 150 houses in 1678. In 1688 Kastrati had only 80 homes. In 1838, Kastrati was said to 2,800 inhabitants, and another source describes it as having 2,400 of which 600 are men-at-arms. In 1866, Kastrati was reported as having 153 Catholic households with 1,001 individuals, and in 1881 with 350 households and 2,300 inhabitants of which 450 are men-at-arms split between 19 villages on an area of 80 square kilometres. In 1897 it is reported as having 450 households and 3,700 inhabitants, and in 1910 with 500 households. In the late 19th century, despite the varying figures, Kastrati had a population of around 2,000-3,000 inhabitants. In 1918, the Kastrati tribal territory was recorded as having 516 households with 3,280 inhabitants, and in 1938 with 2,700 inhabitants, of which 550-950 were men-at-arms.

=== Middle Ages ===
Kastrati is first mentioned in 1403 when its leader Alexius - head of three villages - appears to be awarded gifts by the Venetian governor of Scutari. Alexius Kastrati reappears as head of Kastrati yet again in the Venetian cadastre of Scutari in 1416–7. His immediate kin included Alexius Kastrati the Younger, Pal, Markjen and Lazër Kastrati, but a Jon Stronga was also present in the village - all of these figures display Albanian names and anthroponomy.

=== Ottoman Period ===
In 1613, the Ottomans launched a campaign against the Albanian rebel tribes of Montenegro. In response, the tribes of the Vasaj, Kuçi, Palabardhi, Piperi, Kastrati, Kelmendi, Shkreli and Hoti formed a political and military union known as “The Union of the Mountains” or "The Albanian Mountains". The leaders swore a Besa to resist with all their might any upcoming Ottoman expeditions, thereby protecting their self-government and disallowing the establishment of the authority of the Ottoman Spahis in the northern highlands. Their uprising had a liberating character, with the aim of getting rid of the Ottomans in Albanian territories.

According to the Treaty of San Stefano, the Kastrati tribe (together with the Hoti, Kelmendi and Gruda tribes) were to be annexed to Montenegro, but after the Treaty of Berlin was signed in 1878, this decision was changed and Kastrati remained within the borders of the Ottoman Empire. Cil Vuksani represented the Kastrati tribe at the Congress of Berlin. However, as other Albanian-inhabited areas were formally annexed to Montenegro, the delimitation process was not concluded. In 1883, the Kastrati, Hoti, Gruda and Shkreli tribes formed another pact to prevent the delimitation of the expanded Montenegrin borders. A punitive expedition was carried out in the Hoti, Gruda and Kastrati regions by the Ottomans under Hafiz Pasha on June 10. After gaining control on June 25, the Ottomans razed Hoti. Ded Gjo Luli of Hoti, Smajl Martini of Gruda and Dod Preçi of Kastrati did not surrender and hid in the mountains as fugitives. In a smaller scale, skirmishes and clashes continued well into the 1890s.

After the Young Turk Revolution of 1908 and the subsequent restoration of the Ottoman constitution, the Kastrati tribe made a pledge to support the document and to stop blood feuding with other tribes until November 6. On the 23rd of June during the Albanian revolt of 1911, Albanian tribesmen and other revolutionaries gathered in the location of Greçë near Selcë village in Kelmend and drafted the Greçë Memorandum, demanding Albanian sociopolitical and linguistic rights with five of the signatories being from Kastrati. In later negotiations with the Ottomans, an amnesty was granted to the tribesmen with promises by the government to build one to two primary schools in the nahiye of Kastrati and pay the wages of teachers allocated to them.

The Kastrati tribe participated in the Battle of Deçiq against Ottoman forces, which resulted in an Albanian victory despite the fact that Ottoman forces severely outnumbered the tribesmen. During the battle, the combined efforts of Kelmendi, Shala and Shkreli tribesmen in coordination with Hoti, Gruda and Kastrati tribesmen led to the successful conquest of strategic positions in Deçiq and those close to Tuzi.

=== Modern Period ===
On May 26, 1913, a delegation from the chiefly families of the Hoti, Gruda, Kelmendi, Shkreli and Kastrati tribes met Admiral Cecil Burney of the international fleet and petitioned against the annexation of Hoti and Gruda tribal territory by Montenegro. The delegation warned that hostilities would resume if those areas didn't remain "entirely Albanian". Eventually, due to the influence of Austria-Hungary, the region of Kastrati was incorporated into the newly formed Kingdom of Albania, although it was agreed with some of the Great Powers that it should be annexed to Montenegro.

== Distribution and Families ==
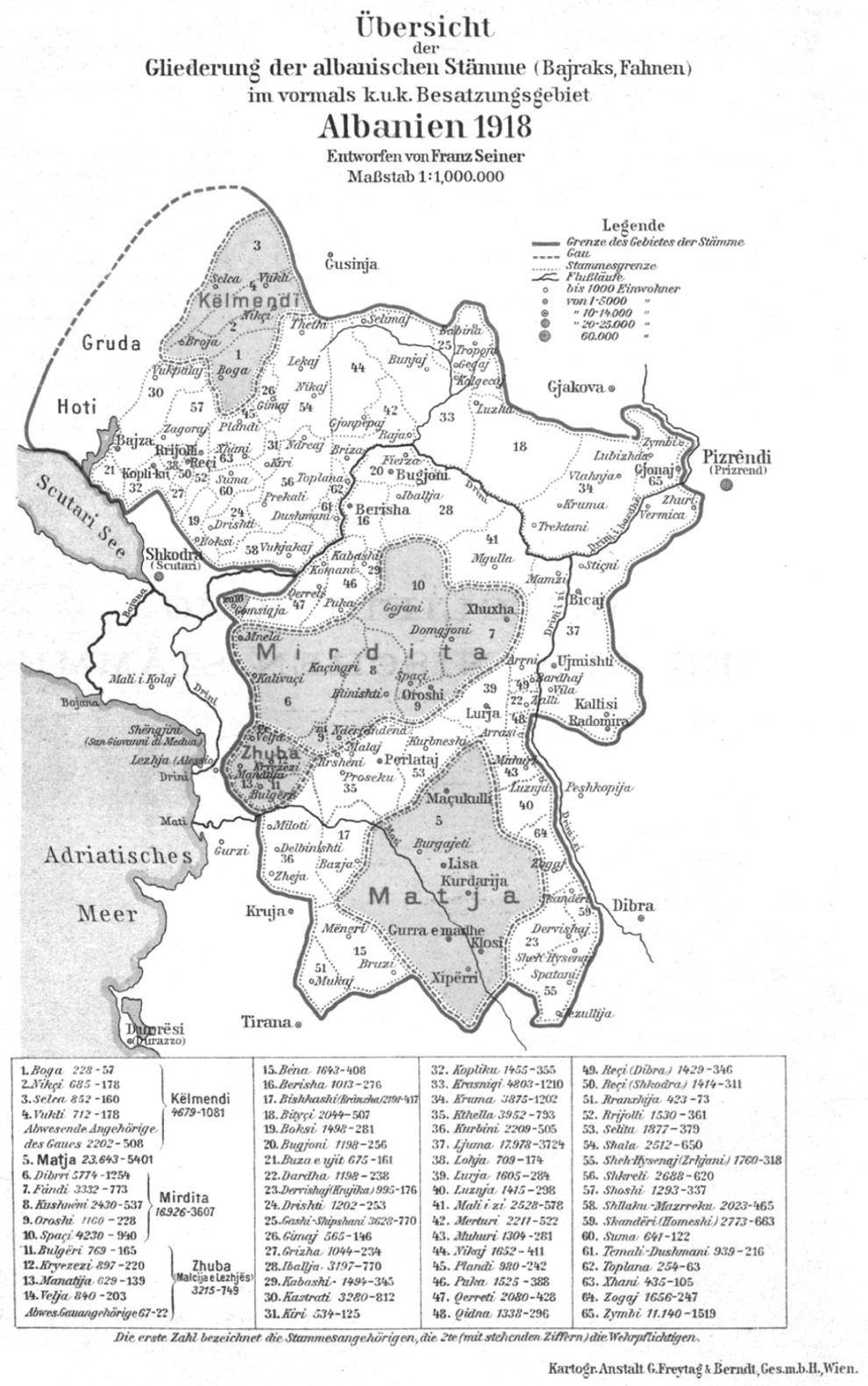
Albanian bayraks as of 1918. Kastrati covers section 30.

Members of the Kastrati tribe can be found throughout Albanian-inhabited lands. In Kosovo, they are notably found in Peja, Gjakova, the village of Karaçeva in Kamenica, and throughout the Gjilan region. There are also Kastrati in Kruma of Luma. A family of the Kastrati tribe lives in Plav.

Johann Georg von Hahn registered 408 families with 3,157 people living in two groups of families: highland and lowland. Highland families were Martinaj, Gjokaj, Theresi, Bradosoi, Budischia, Kurtaj, Goraj and Pjetroviç while lowland families were Puta, Copani, Hikuzzaj, Skandsehi, Pjetrosçinaj, Moxetti, Dobrovoda and Aliaj. All of them were Catholics except the Aliaj, who were Muslims. In the late Ottoman period, the tribe of Kastrati consisted of 300 Catholic and 200 Muslim households.

== Religion and Culture ==
The predominant religion of the Kastrati tribe is Roman Catholicism. The Kastrati celebrate the feast of St. Mark, who is venerated by the tribe as their patron saint. The Catholic parish was founded in 1678, and the church was built in 1726. A new church and parsonage were built in 1901.

The Kastrati were among the two tribes with which the Hoti tribe would regularly intermarry. The Kastrati tribe believed that a snake sighted by a wren lost its ability to transform into a kulshedra. In 1907, the Kastrati were described as kind, gentle, humble and pious by Bosnian Croatian priest Lovro Mihačević, who went on to call them a proud people who enjoy singing heroic songs with the lahuta.

== See also ==
- List of clans of Albania
