= Gruemiri =

Albanian tribe based in the region of Malësia

Gruemiri (alternatively, Gruemira) is a small historical Albanian tribe (fis) in the former municipality of Gruemirë in the region of Malësia.

== Name ==
Historical and linguistic understanding about the patronym and toponym Gruemiri/Gruemirë increased as new, published archival records have become available. Traditionally, in Albanological research it has been seen as compound of grua (woman) and mirë (good). This has led to theories which claim that the name may have been taken after the strong leadership a woman may have held in the tribe in the past. Another theory based in the rendering of the toponym in the defter of Scutari in 1485 as Kuruemira proposes an etymology as a compound of krua (water spring) + mirë (good). The people of the fis are called Gruemiras.

== History ==
The Gruemiri are first mentioned in the cadaster of Venetian Scutari (Shkodra) in 1416–7. They lived in two villages named after the community: Gruemira e Madhe (16 households) and Gruemira e Vogël (two households). Gruemira e Madhe (Grouemira grand in the original) is identified with the settlement of Gruemirë and Gruemira e Vogël with a neighbourhood of Grizhë, Gruemirë-Çezme.

Their mode of social organization was based on kinship ties as evidenced by the fact that the majority of household heads of their villages held the same surname, Gruemiri. The community was headed by Pjetër Gruemiri. The village of Gruemira e Madhe had four Catholic priests, two of them were members of the community: Johan Gruemiri and Aleks Gruemiri. Gruemira's church was dedicated St. Stephen (Shën Shtjefni). Viticulture was one of their main economic activities. It brought them in dispute with the pronoiar of Grizhë, Gjin Murari who tried to increase their feudal obligations and his share in their winegrowing production. A committee of Gruemiri headed by Pjetër Gruemiri and their priest Johan, went to Scutari in 1416 and petitioned against the claim of Gjin Murari. Albano Contarini, the Venetian governor accepted their petition.

Gruemira is again mentioned in 1485 in the defter of the sanjak of Scutari. It had sixteen households and four unmarried inhabitants. The community's village was part of the timar of Silahdar Iskender. A Catholic priest Dom Primus Gruemira is mentioned by Marino Bizzi in 1610 in Juban. In the Ottoman period, the Gruemiri began to convert to Islam. The two strongest feudal families in the Plav-Gusinje region (~90 km to the northeast of Gruemirë) trace their origin to Gruemiri. The Rexhepagaj of Plav, Montenegro (now, Redžepagić-Rexhepagiqi) moved to Plav in the beginning of the 1650s where their ancestor took the Muslim name Veli when he converted. Rexhep Aga who gave the name to the family was a great-great-grandson of Veli. The Shabanagaj (now also known as Šabanagić) were related via marriage with the Bushati family of Shkodra. Shaban Aga, their eponymous ancestor was the son-in-law of Sulejman Pasha Bushati, sanjakbey of Shkodra. He was sent in Gusinje as the commander of the fortress around 1690. The Shabanagaj family owned large estates in Berane. Ali Pasha of Gusinje, commander of the League of Prizren was a Shabanagaj and Jashar Rexhepagiq, pedagogue in Kosovo, was a Rexhepagaj.

The historical fis formed a single bajrak with Grizha in the 19th century and became part of the wider bajrak of Koplik with the fis of upper and lower Koplik. The British Naval Intelligence Division did a survey of the region during World War I. According to the results published by His Majesty's Stationery Office in 1916, Gruemira and Grizha had a total of 75 households and 900 inhabitants. Most of them were Muslim.

== Bibliography ==
- Dedushaj, Rexhep (1993). Krahina e Plavë-Gucisë nëpër shekuj [The region of Plav-Gusinje throughout the centuries]. New York.
- Elsie, Robert (2003). Early Albania : a reader of historical texts, 11th-17th centuries. ISBN 978-3-44704783-8. OCLC 52911172.
- Filipović, Milenko (1982). Among the People, Native Yugoslav Ethnography: Selected Writing of Milenko S. Filipović. Michigan Slavic Publications, Department of Slavic Languages and Literatures.
- Halimi, Mehmet (1986). "Toponimet kompozitore mesjetare në të folmet e sotme shqipe [Compounds in the toponymy of modern Albania]". Gjurmime Albanologjike. 15–16. Albanological Institute of Pristina.
- A Handbook of Serbia, Montenegro, Albania and Adjacent Parts of Greece. H.M. Stationery Office. 1916.
- Pulaha, Selami (1974). Defter i Sanxhakut të Shkodrës 1485. Academy of Sciences of Albania.
- Pulaha, Selami (1975). "Kontribut për studimin e ngulitjes së katuneve dhe krijimin e fiseve në Shqipe ̈rine ̈ e veriut shekujt XV-XVI' [Contribution to the Study of Village Settlements and the Formation of the Tribes of Northern Albania in the 15th century]". Studime Historike. 12.
- Zamputi, Injac (1977). Regjistri i kadastrēs dhe i koncesioneve pēr rrethin e Shkodrës 1416-1417. Academy of Sciences of Albania.
