= Kastrati (surname) =

Origin
- Region of origin: Albania

Kastrati is an Albanian surname. It is derived from the name of a tribe of the Malësi e Madhe area in Northern Albania. In 1403, certain Aleksa Kastrati, a lord of three villages, received a gift from the governor of Shkodër.

People called Kastrati include:

- Antoneta Kastrati, Kosovo-born film director and screenwriter
- Arian Kastrati (born 2001), Kosovan footballer
- Bekim Kastrati (born 1979), Albanian footballer
- Elhan Kastrati (born 1997), Albanian footballer
- Erjon Kastrati (born 1994), Kosovan basketball player
- Fitim Kastrati (born 1994), Norwegian football midfielder
- Flamur Kastrati (born 1991), Kosovan footballer
- Florian Kastrati (born 2002), Albanian footballer
- Ilir Kastrati (born 1994), Albanian footballer
- Kastriot Kastrati (born 1993), Finnish footballer
- Lirim Kastrati, multiple people
- Resul Kastrati (born 1994), Albanian footballer
- Sajmir Kastrati (born 1987), Albanian footballer
- Shefqet Kastrati (born 1961), Albanian entrepreneur and the founder of Kastrati Group
- Vénera Kastrati, Albanian contemporary artist
- Visar Kastrati (born 1986), Kosovan football referee

== See also ==
- House of Kastrioti
