= Kastrat =

Kastrat may refer to:

- Kastrat (municipality), a former municipality in Albania
- Kastrat (settlement), Albania
- Kastrat (Kuršumlija), Serbia

== See also ==
- Kastrati (disambiguation)
