= Lambulić =

Lambulić (Serbian Cyrillic: Лaмбулић) is a Montenegrin surname, found in Montenegro and Serbia. Between 1810 and 1813, the Lambulić family migrated from Zeta (now Montenegro) to Grilë (now Albania). In 1935, four families with the surname left the Vrakë region and settled in Vranjak, Orahovac (now Kosovo). It may refer to:

- Mladen Lambulić (born 1972), Montenegrin footballer
- Igor Lambulić (born 1988), Montenegrin footballer
- Zarija Lambulić (born 1998), Serbian footballer

== See also ==
- Lambić
