= Mëshqerrë =

- Village
- Location within Albania
- Coordinates: 42°10′35″N 19°30′21″E
- Country: Albania
- County: Shkodër
- Municipality: Malësi e Madhe
- Administrative unit: Gruemirë
- Time zone: UTC+1 (CET)
  - Summer (DST): UTC+2 (CEST)

Mëshqerrë (in local Gheg dialect Mshqerrë, definite form Mshqerra) is a settlement in the former Gruemirë municipality, Shkodër County, northern Albania. At the 2015 local government reform it became part of the municipality Malësi e Madhe.
