= Kamicë-Flakë =

- Village
- Location within Albania
- Coordinates: 42°13′49″N 19°22′48″E
- Country: Albania
- County: Shkodër
- Municipality: Malësi e Madhe
- Administrative unit: Qendër

Population
  - Total: 957
- Time zone: UTC+1 (CET)
  - Summer (DST): UTC+2 (CEST)

Kamicë-Flakë (Albanian definite form: Kamica-Flaka, Serbian: Каменица / Kamenica) is a settlement in the former Qendër municipality, Shkodër County, northern Albania. At the 2015 local government reform it became part of the municipality Malësi e Madhe. It has a population of 957. For administrative purposes, it was grouped under the tribal region of Kastrati in the Ottoman period. Its area consists of two previously distinct settlements Kamicë (Albanian definite form: Kamica; alternatively known in its older form, Kamenicë, Albanian definite form: Kamenica) and Flakë (Albanian definite form: Flaka).

== History ==
The location Kamenica appears uninhabited in the Venetian cadastre of the city of Shkodra in 1416–7. It was a location of 300 acres (1.2 km^{2}) that is described as partly arable, partly forest, partly used as grazing ground. The rights of economic activity in this location belonged to the Tuzi tribe (fis). In the Ottoman defter of 1485 of the sanjak of Scutari the location isn't mentioned as either grazing ground or as part of a settlement.

In a work of Jovan Cvijić it was recorded that in Kamenicë (Serbian: Каменица / Kamenica of the Kastrati region the majority of the population were Orthodox Serbs at the beginning of the 20th century. Today, the village is still inhabited by a Serb–Montenegrin community.

During the early 2010s linguists Klaus Steinke and Xhelal Ylli seeking to corroborate villages cited in past literature as being Slavic speaking carried out fieldwork in settlements of the area. Kamicë in the Shkodër area is one of a number of villages with a Slavophone population that speak a Montenegrin dialect. The village of Kamicë is almost deserted, with five or six minority Orthodox Montenegrin families left, alongside the few Albanian families.
