= Serbs and Montenegrins in Albania =

Ethnic group

Serbomalazezët në Shqipëri Срби и Црногорци у Албанији Srbi i Crnogorci u Albaniji

Total population
- 586 Serbs (2023) 511 Montenegrins (2023)

Regions with significant populations
- Shkodër County

Languages
- Albanian and Serbian/Montenegrin

Religion
- Predominately Eastern Orthodoxy, minority Sunni Islam

Serbs and Montenegrins or Serbs-Montenegrins (Note: The community is commonly known as Serbs-Montenegrins (Montenegrin/Serbian: Срби-Црногорци, Srbi-Crnogorci; Albanian: Serbomalazezët në Shqipëri), "Serbs" (Srbi) or "Montenegrins" (Crnogorci). It has also been called the Serbo-Montenegrin minority (srpsko-crnogorska manjina) by the Council of Europe) are a recognized ethnic minority in Albania. According to data from the 2023 census, 586 declared themselves as ethnic Serbs and 511 as ethnic Montenegrins.

The majority of the Serbo-Montenegrin ethnic minority came to Albania from Montenegro during the interwar period but largely emigrated in the 1990s.

== History ==
=== Middle Ages ===
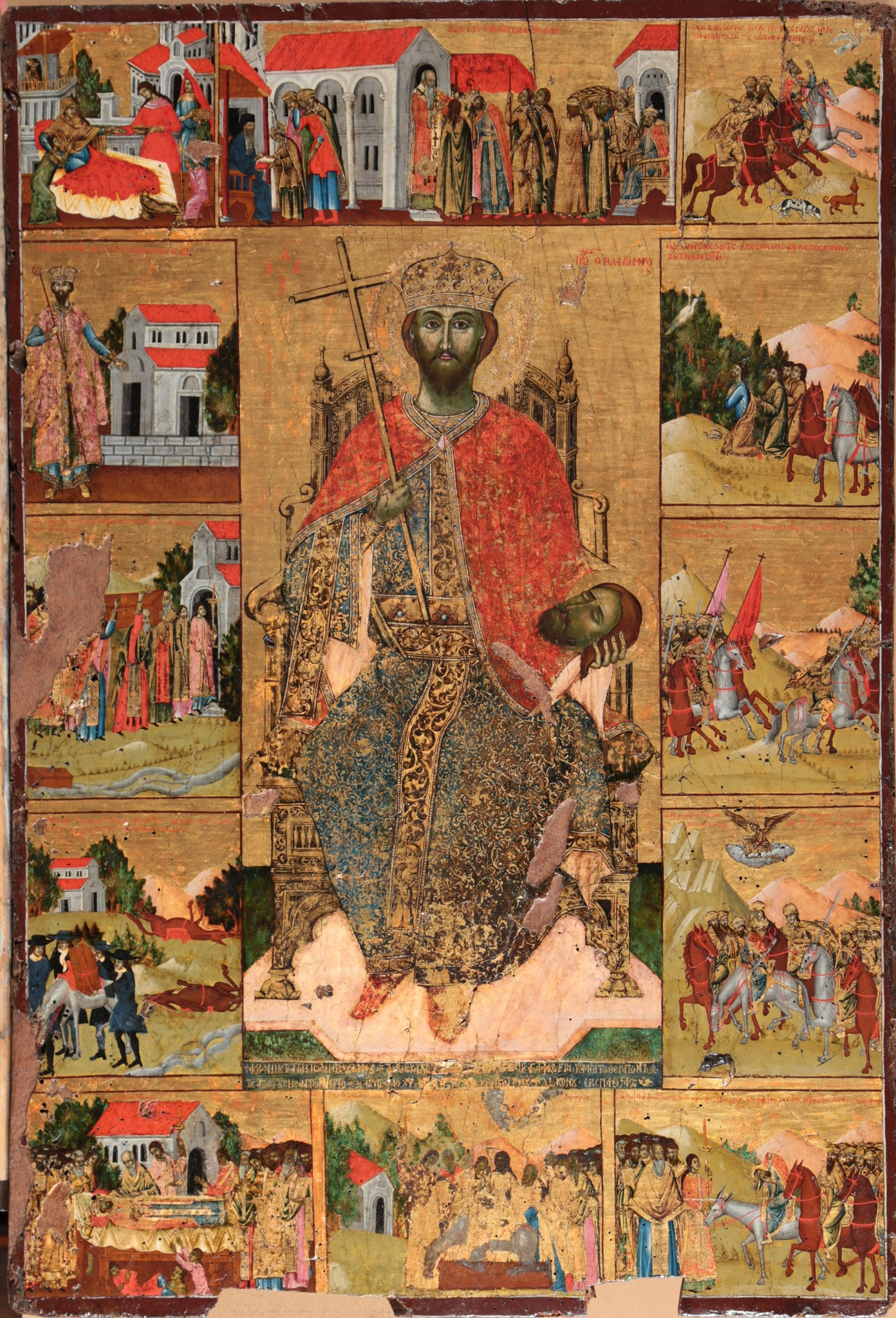
Saint Jovan Vladimir, a 1739 icon from the Ardenica Monastery in Albania

With short interruptions, the territory that later became a part of Sanjak of Scutari in the Ottoman Empire, belonged to the Serbian medieval feudal states for many centuries. According to Emperor Constantine VII (r. 913–959), the early Serbs lived in the former Roman provinces of Dalmatia, Praevalitana, and Moesia. During the rule of Časlav Klonimirović (r. 927–960), all of Albania was part of Bulgarian Empire (eastern) and the Byzantine Empire (Dyrrhachium (theme), western maritime). After the Byzantine annexation of Raška, the Serbian principality of Duklja succeeded as the main Serb state and it included much of the land north of Durrës, with Shkodër being an important city. Emperor Samuel of Bulgaria (r. 997–1014) had by 997 conquered all of Thessaly, Epirus, Macedonia, and most of modern Albania.

Jovan Vladimir ruled Duklja during the war between Byzantine Emperor Basil II and Samuel. Vladimir allegedly retreated into Koplik when Samuel invaded Duklja, and was subsequently forced to accept Bulgarian vassalage. Vladimir was later slewn by the Bulgars, and received a cult; Shingjon (the feast of St. Jovan Vladimir), which is celebrated by the Albanian Orthodox Christians. In 1018 Basil II conquered most of the Balkans and established the Archbishopric of Ohrid for the South Slavs. In the 1030s, Stefan Vojislav expelled the last strategos and defeated the Byzantines in 1042, then set up Shkodër (Skadar) as his capital.

Constantine Bodin accepted the crusaders of the Crusade of 1101 in Shkodër. After the dynastic struggles in the 12th century, Shkodër became part of the Nemanjić Zeta province. In 1330, Stefan Uroš III appointed his son Stefan Dušan as the "Young King" and ruler of Zeta seated in Shkodër. According to the Chronicle of the Priest of Duklja, several Serbian rulers and members of the Vojislavljević dynasty of Duklja were buried in the Shirgj Church on the Bojana river, founded by Helen of Anjou, Queen of Serbia, such as Constantine Bodin, Mihailo I, Dobroslav, Vladimir, and Gradinja.

During the fall of the Serbian Empire in the 14th century, Shkodër was taken by the Balšić family of Zeta who surrendered the city to Venice, in order to form protection zone from the Ottoman Empire. During Venetian rule the city adopted the Statutes of Scutari, a civic law written in Venetian, which also contained Albanian elements such as Besa and Gjakmarrja. Principality of Zeta, a former Ottoman vassal, lost its status as an independent state and was largely incorporated into the Sanjak of Scutari in 1499. In 1514, this territory was separated from the Sanjak of Scutari and established as a separate sanjak, under the rule of Skenderbeg Crnojević. When he died in 1528, the Sanjak of Montenegro was reincorporated into the Sanjak of Scutari as a unique administrative unit (vilayet) with certain degree of autonomy.

=== Modern period ===
During the Montenegrin–Ottoman War (1876–78), the Montenegrin Army managed to capture certain areas and settlements along the border, and incorporated them into the state such as the town of Podgorica that had a significant Slavic Muslim population. The Muslim population of Podgorica fled and Slavic Muslims from the town migrated and resettled in Shkodër city and its environs. From 1878 onward a small Muslim Montenegrin speaking community living near Shkodër exists and are known as Podgoriçani, due to their origins from Podgorica in Montenegro.

In the late Ottoman period, the French consul of Shkodër noted the sentiments of the people of Vraka wanting to be united with Montenegro, though this was not achievable due to the distance of Vraka from the then border.

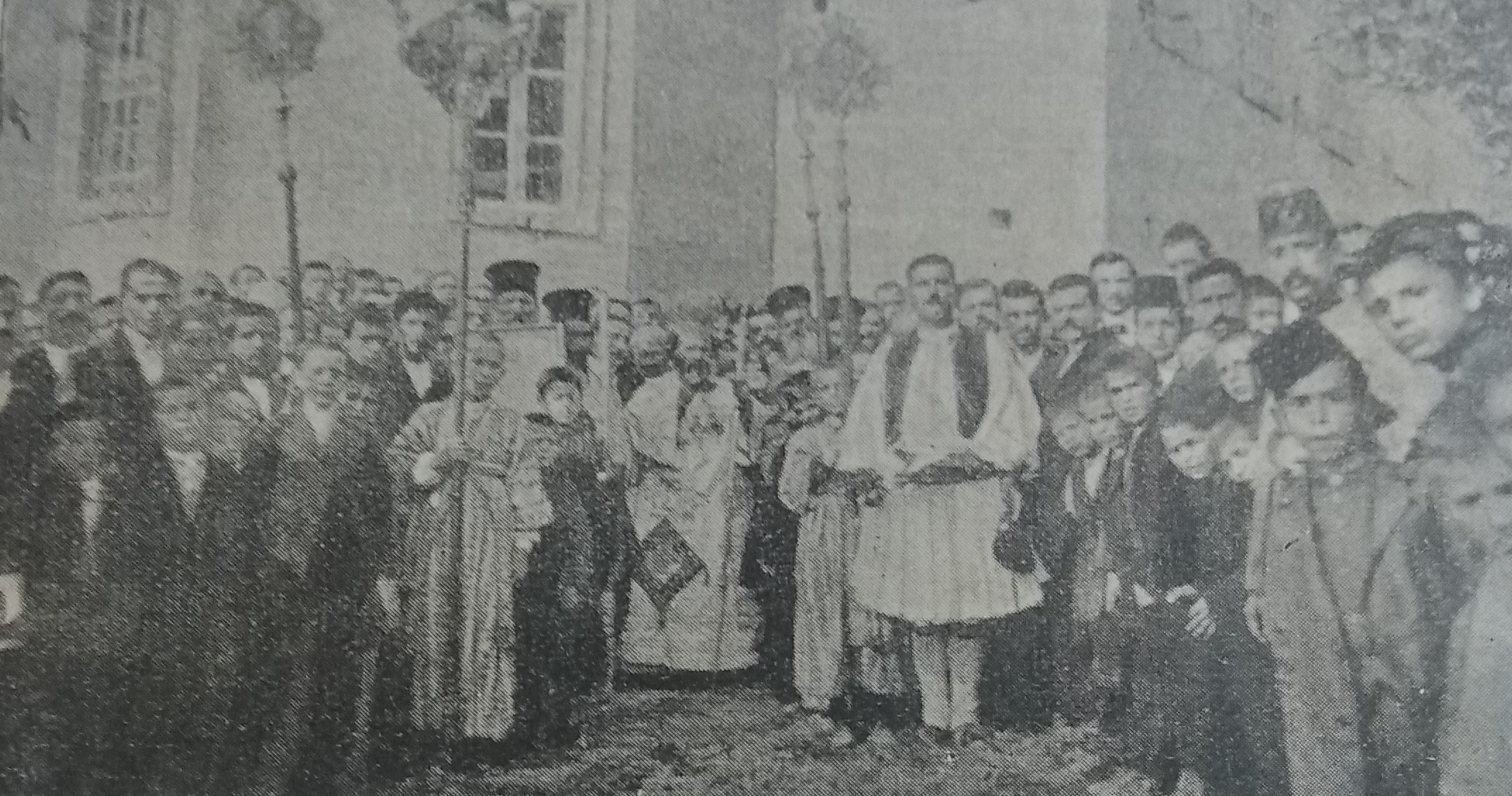
Reception of the Serbian Army in Durrës, 1912

During the interwar period, relations between King Zog and Kingdom of Yugoslavia were less problematic and Yugoslav-Albanian borders allowed for the free movement of populations. The majority of the Serbo-Montenegrin community came to Albania from Montenegro during the interwar period, following 1926 and later from 1938 until 1948. At the time Vraka contained poor land and was still an undeveloped area. Unlike the Albanian inhabitants of the area, the new population from Montenegro had skills in operating the iron plough and motor vehicles to cultivate the land.

The Serbian minority in Scutari had celebrated its liturgy in Serbian. The Serbian Metropolitan of Scutari participated in the Albanian Synod.

Vraka is known for having been the place where poet Millosh Gjergj Nikolla became teacher on 23 April 1933, and it was in this period that he started to write prose sketches and verses.

=== Contemporary period ===
As part of assimilation politics during the rule of communist regime in Albania, Serb-Montenegrins were not allowed to have Serbian names, especially family names ending with the characteristic suffix "ich".

After the 1981 protests in Kosovo, Albanian Serbs complained of harassment and pressure to leave the country.

As the borders of Albania opened up in 1990, many members of the Serbo-Montenegrin community left between March and December 1991 for Montenegro and Vraka, Boriç, and other nearby areas became severely depopulated. During that time with economic problems and tensions arising in areas of the former Yugoslavia, it made some 600 of them return home to Albania. The Morača-Rozafa Association was established in 1992.

During the Yugoslav Wars, there were incidents of violence against the Serb-Montenegrin minority in places like Vraka, Boriç i Vogël, and Boriç i Madh, where the Albanian government tried to forcibly take land from them. There were reports that the Albanian government also attempted to forcibly resettle Serb-Montenegrins and Podgoriçani from Boriç i Vogël, Boriç i Madh, Vraka, and other places.

In 1992, as part of state policy by Serbia to increase the numbers of Serbs in Kosovo, nearly 3,000 Serbs from Albania emigrated after accepting a government offer for employment and housing in the area.

Nowadays, the community lives largely on trade with Montenegro and communal relations with Albanian inhabitants are regarded as good by many of its members.

== Demographics ==
In the late 19th and 20th century, of the 600-700 people of the Orthodox faith living in the city of Shkodër, some 500-600 were Serbo-Montenegrins. The area of Vraka had a population of 600-700 Orthodox Slavophones.

During the World War I occupying Austro-Hungarian forces conducted a census of parts of Albania they held. The overall census results are considered to be first instance of reliable information on the number of households and inhabitants as well as the ethnic composition of these places. In the territory of modern-day area of Shkodër county, settlements that had Slapvophone majority populations within them were:

- Grilë: 204 Serbo-Croats, 1 Albanian; 1 Catholic, 204 Orthodox.
- Omaraj: 148 Serbo-Croats, 5 Albanians; 4 Catholics, 148 Orthodox, 1 Muslim.
- Shtoj: 166 Serbo-Croats; 7 Catholics, 159 Muslims.
- Tarabosh: 24 Serbo-Croats, 19 Albanians; 2 Catholics, 7 Orthodox, 188 Muslims.

In the early 1990s, the official Albanian statistics placed the ethnic Montenegrin community at 100, due to 700 of them leaving Albania during the democratisation process. The Association of Montenegrins, a social-cultural organisation founded in Vraka claimed some 1,000 members that represented the interests of a community of 2,500 people located in Shkodër and the surrounding area. It urged the Albanian government to recognise the Montenegrin and Serb communities in Albania and allow certain linguistic, education, cultural, and other rights. In the 1990s, the Albanian Helsinki Committee estimated that there were ca. 2,000 "Serb–Montenegrins" in total with their center in Vraka. In the early 1990s, almost all of them settled in Montenegro, but later about 600 out of 2,000 returned to Albania.

In the early 1990s, scholar Slobodan Šćepanović collected data through interviews with individual Albanian immigrants and Albanian citizens of the region that came to Serbia and Montenegro. Without specifying the sources, he gave the following figures:

- Boriç i Vogël (Stari/Mali Borič): majority of Serbs–Montenegrins (67 households) and minority of Albanians (8 households)
- Boriç i Madh (Mladi/Veliki Borič): majority of Slavic Muslims hailing from Podgorica - Podgoriçani (86 families) and minorities of Albanians (20 families) and Serbs–Montenegrins (6 families)
- Grilë (Grilj): majority of Serbs–Montenegrins (76 households) and minority of Albanians (9 households)
- Omaraj (Omara): majority of Serbs–Montenegrins (68 households) and minority of Albanians (11 households)

In the early 2010s, linguists Klaus Steinke and Xhelal Ylli seeking to corroborate villages cited in past literature as being Slavophone carried out fieldwork in the area. In the Shkodër area exists seven villages with a Slavophone population that speak a Montenegrin dialect.

- Boriç i Madh: one third of the population is compact and composed of Slavic Muslims (Podgoriçani).
- Boriç i Vogël: inhabited by 15 families and the Slavophone families are the only Eastern Orthodox compact group of in Vraka.
- Grilë: inhabited by 1,090 inhabitants or 195 families, whereas the number of Eastern Orthodox ethnic Montenegrin families ranges between two, three to ten. An Albanian school exists in Grilë along with a newly built Orthodox church that is without a priest. According to Slavophone locals, the Orthodox population moved from Montenegro to Darragjat, due to blood feuds and later between 1935 and 1936, they relocated themselves to the Vraka area in places such as Grilë. Some Orthodox Montenegrins from the village moved to Montenegro in the 1990s with some thereafter returning to Grilë.
- Omaraj: in the village only two Eastern Orthodox ethnic Montenegrin families remain.
- Shtoj i Ri: the village has a compact population of 17 Slavic Muslim Podgoriçani families.
- Shtoj i Vjetër: the village has a compact population of 30 Slavic Muslim Podgoriçani families.
- Shkodër (city): some Eastern Orthodox ethnic Montenegrin and Muslim Podgoriçani families live there.

== Notable people ==
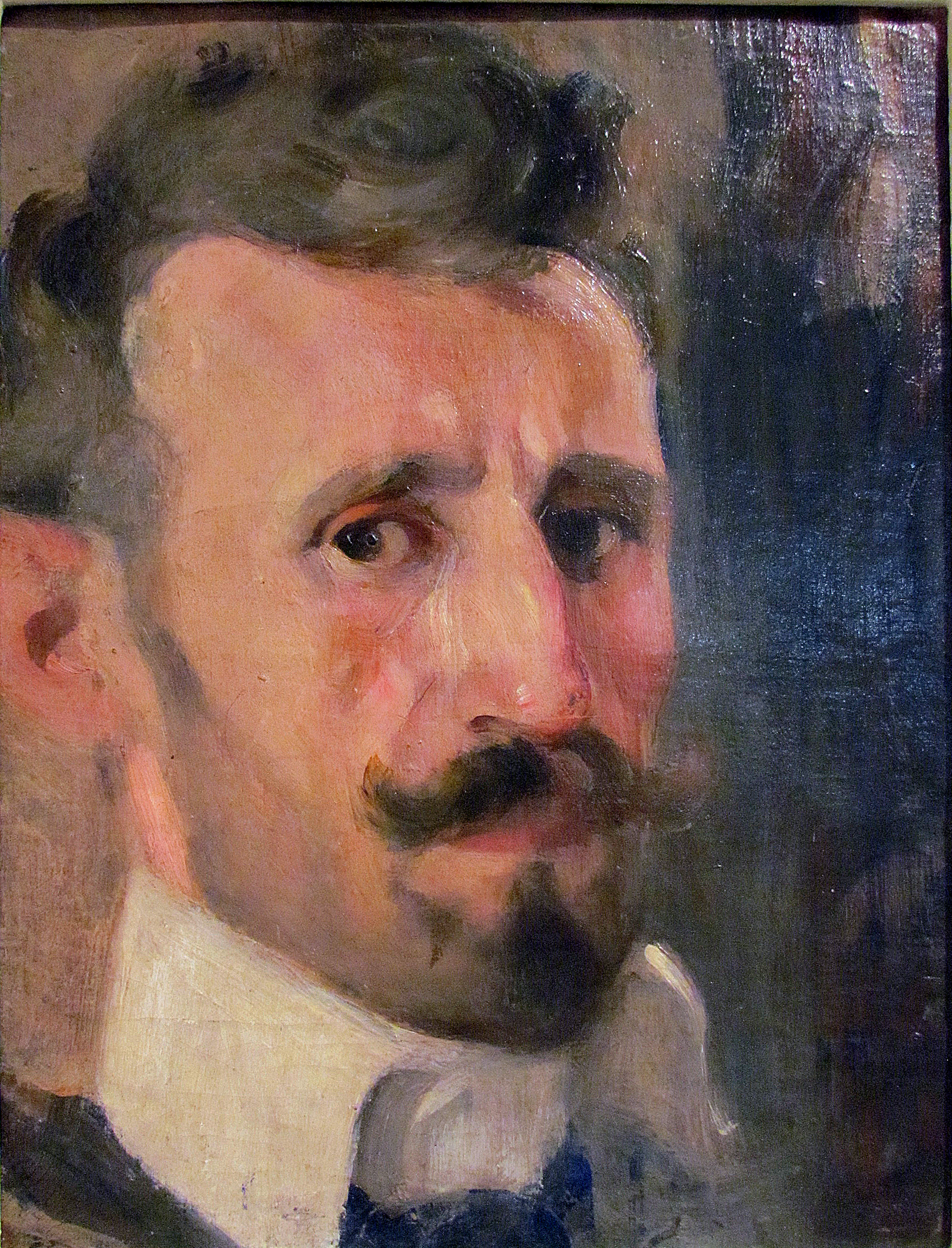
Kosta Miličević

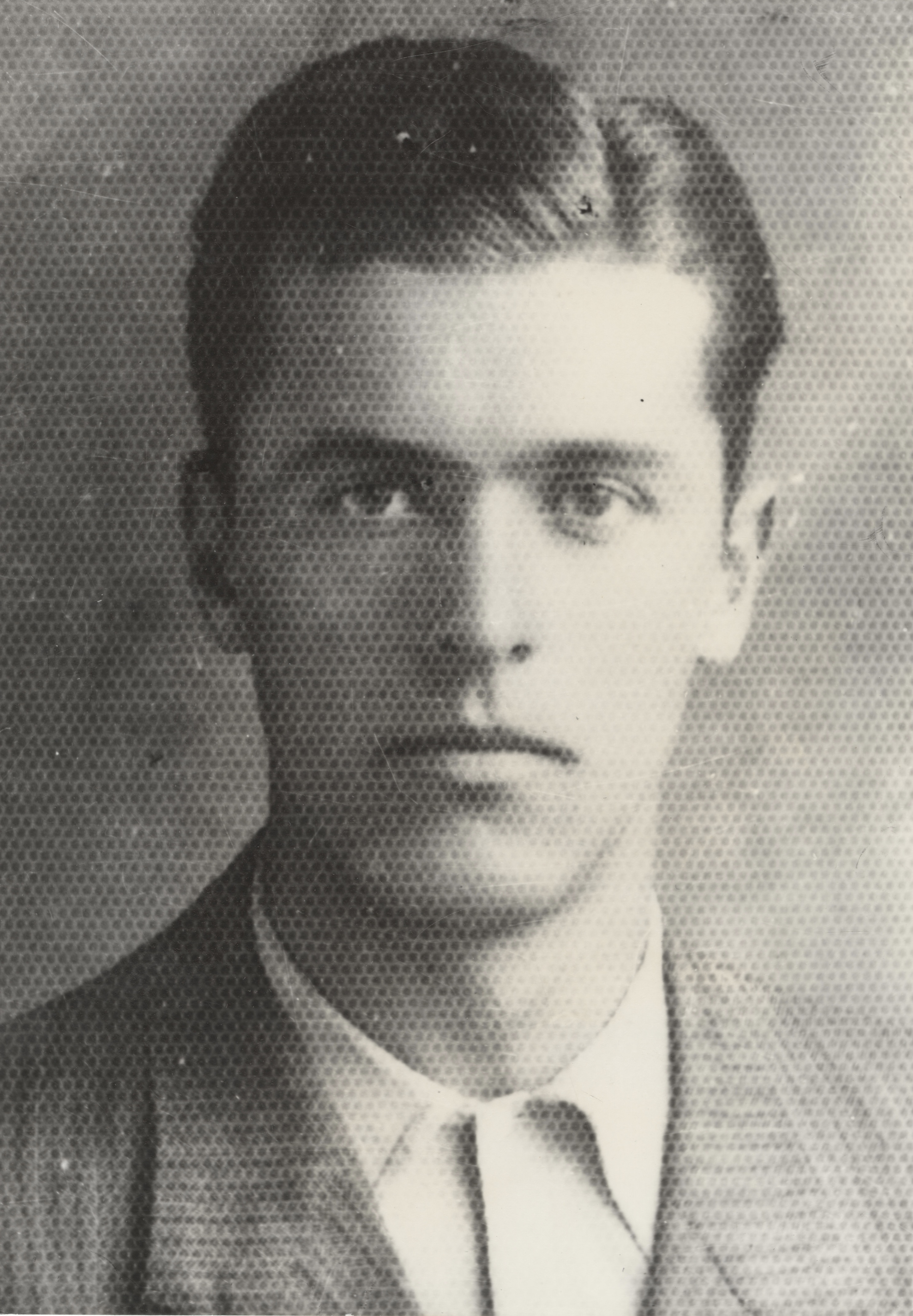
Vojo Kushi

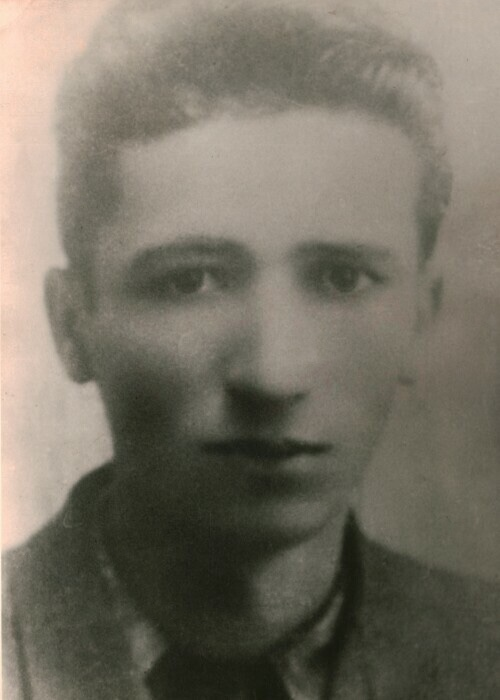
Branko Kadia

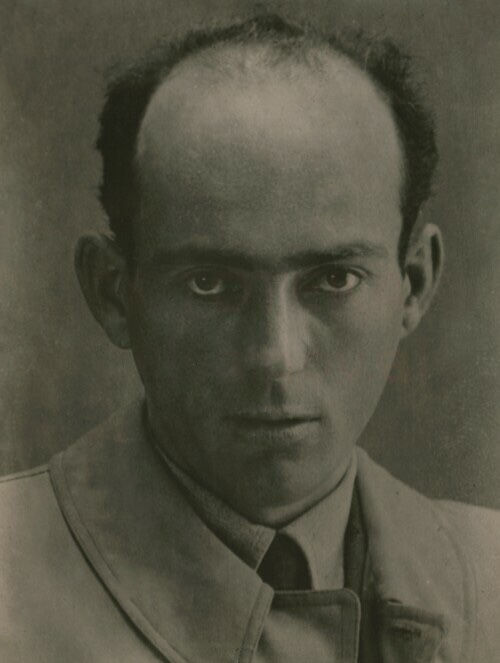
Jordan Misja

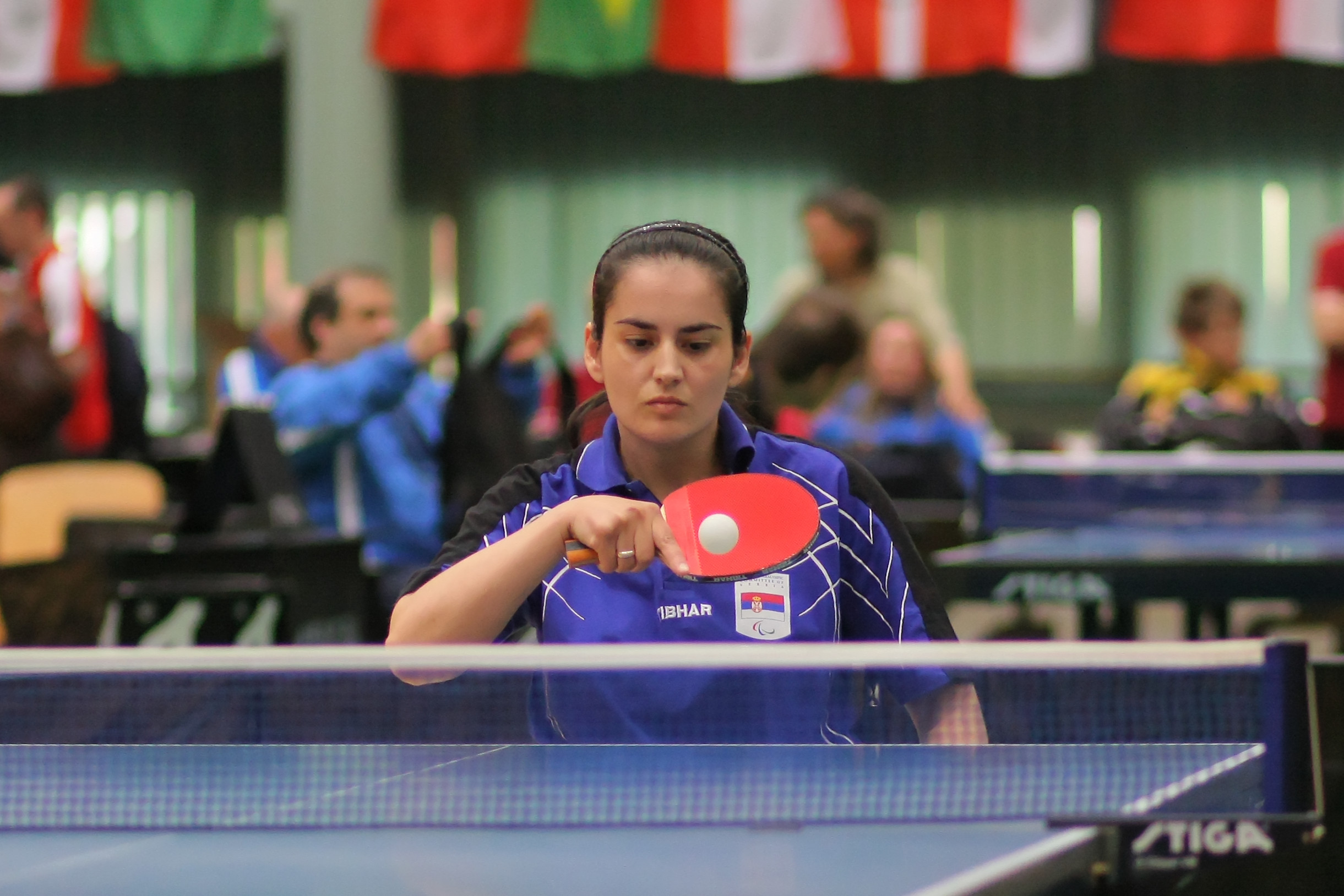
Nada Matić

- George Berovich – Ottoman statesman
- Branko Kadia – communist guerrilla fighter
- Vojo Kushi – communist guerrilla fighter
- Stefan Marinović – Venetian printer
- Nada Matić – paralympic table tennis player
- Kosta Miličević – painter
- Jordan Misja – communist guerrilla fighter
- Nikola Musulin – teacher, activist, and poet
- Nikola Vulić – historian, philologist, and archaeologist

== See also ==
- Albania–Montenegro relations
- Albania–Serbia relations
