= Jeran, Albania =

Jeran
- Village
- Location within Albania
- Coordinates: 42°16′5″N 19°26′56″E
- Country: Albania
- County: Shkodër
- Municipality: Malësi e Madhe
- Administrative unit: Kastrat

Population
  - Total: 661
- Time zone: UTC+1 (CET)
  - Summer (DST): UTC+2 (CEST)

Jeran (also known as Jaran) is a settlement in the former Kastrat Municipality, Shkodër County, northern Albania. At the 2015 local government reform it became part of the municipality Malësi e Madhe. It has a population of 661.
