= Grudë, Albania =

Grudë Fushe
- Village
- Location within Albania
- Coordinates: 42°9′44.46″N 19°29′5.892″E
- Country: Albania
- County: Shkodër
- Municipality: Malësi e Madhe
- Administrative unit: Gruemirë
- Time zone: UTC+1 (CET)
  - Summer (DST): UTC+2 (CEST)

Grudë (also known as Grudë Fushe) is a settlement in the former Gruemirë municipality, Shkodër County, northern Albania. At the 2015 local government reform it became part of the municipality Malësi e Madhe. In 1485, the village's inhabitants maintained Albanian anthroponymy, indicating Albanians inhabited the village during this time.
