= Koplik i Sipërm =

- Village
- Location within Albania
- Coordinates: 42°13′42″N 19°28′0″E
- Country: Albania
- County: Shkodër
- Municipality: Malësi e Madhe
- Administrative unit: Qendër

Population
  - Total: 1,259
- Time zone: UTC+1 (CET)
  - Summer (DST): UTC+2 (CEST)

Koplik i Sipërm is a settlement in the former Qendër municipality, Shkodër County, northern Albania. At the 2015 local government reform it became part of the municipality Malësi e Madhe. It has a population of 1,259.
