= Rrash-Kullaj =

- Village
- Location within Albania
- Coordinates: 42°9′4″N 19°31′45″E
- Country: Albania
- County: Shkodër
- Municipality: Malësi e Madhe
- Administrative unit: Gruemirë
- Time zone: UTC+1 (CET)
  - Summer (DST): UTC+2 (CEST)

Rrash-Kullaj (also known as Kulla të Rrashit and Kulla të Boksit, Serbian: Раш и Куле) is a settlement in the former Gruemirë municipality, Shkodër County, northern Albania. At the 2015 local government reform it became part of the municipality Malësi e Madhe. The settlement is historically part of the Vraka region.

== History ==
During the first World War occupying Austro-Hungarian forces conducted a census (1916-1918) of parts of Albania they held such as the wider Shkodër region and of Rrash-Kullaj they recorded 10 households, 122 people: 122 Albanians; 122 Orthodox. Though linguists Klaus Steinke and Xhelal Ylli consider the overall census results regarding the Shkodër area to be the first instance of reliable information on the number of households and inhabitants as well as the ethnic and religious composition of these places, they note that the data for Rrash-Kullaj is somewhat unclear as the inhabitants are referred to as both Albanians and Orthodox.
