= Rrapshë =

- Village
- Location within Albania
- Coordinates: 42°23′8″N 19°29′34″E
- Country: Albania
- County: Shkodër
- Municipality: Malësi e Madhe
- Administrative unit: Kastrat

Population
  - Total: 813
- Time zone: UTC+1 (CET)
  - Summer (DST): UTC+2 (CEST)

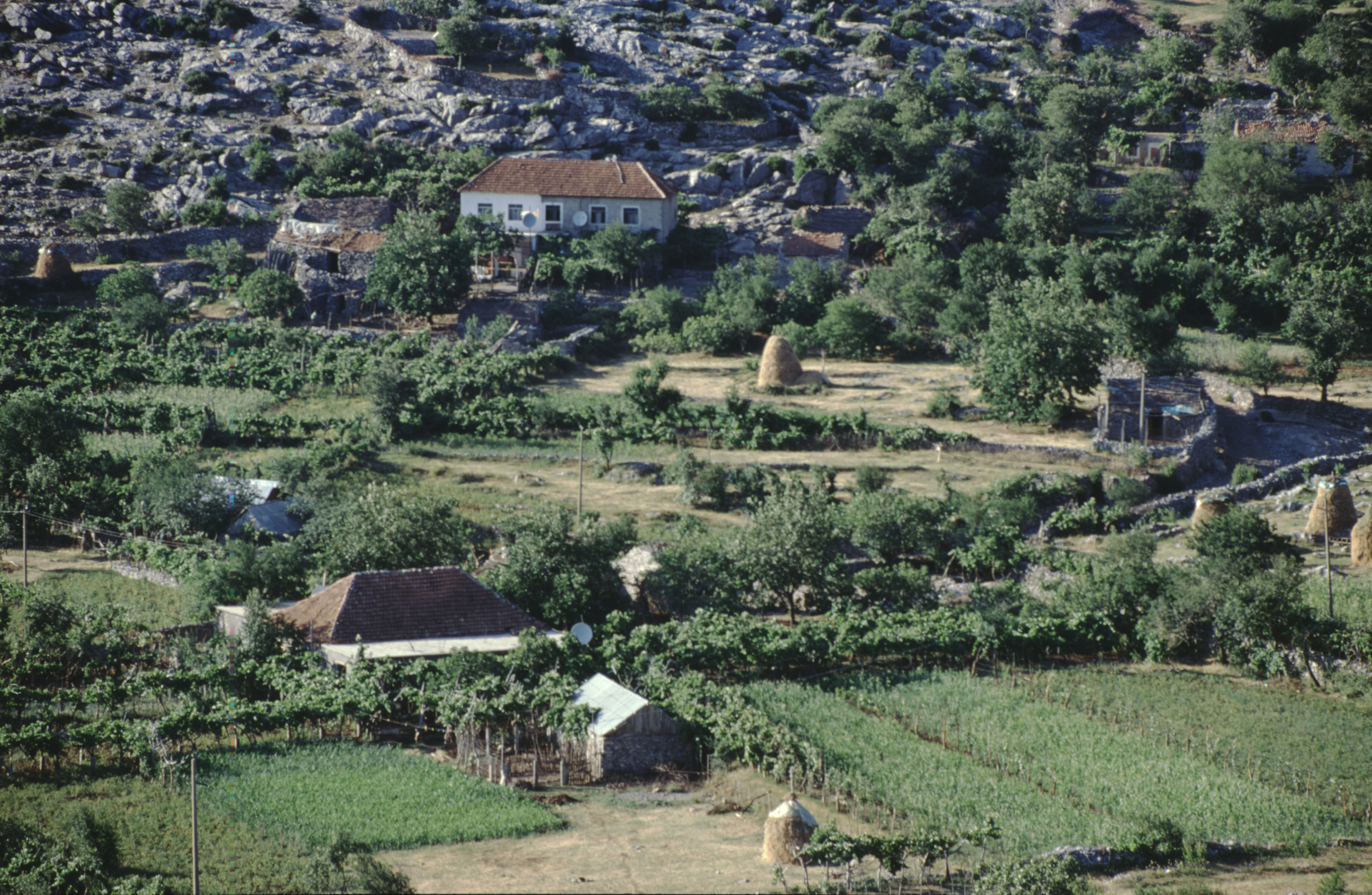
Rrapsh-Stare, Northern Albania (1999)

Rrapshë (also known as Rrapshë-Starë) is a settlement in the former Kastrat Municipality, Shkodër County, northern Albania. At the 2015 local government reform it became part of the municipality Malësi e Madhe. It has a population of 813.
