= Koplik War =

1920–21 conflict in the Balkans

- Part of Interwar period
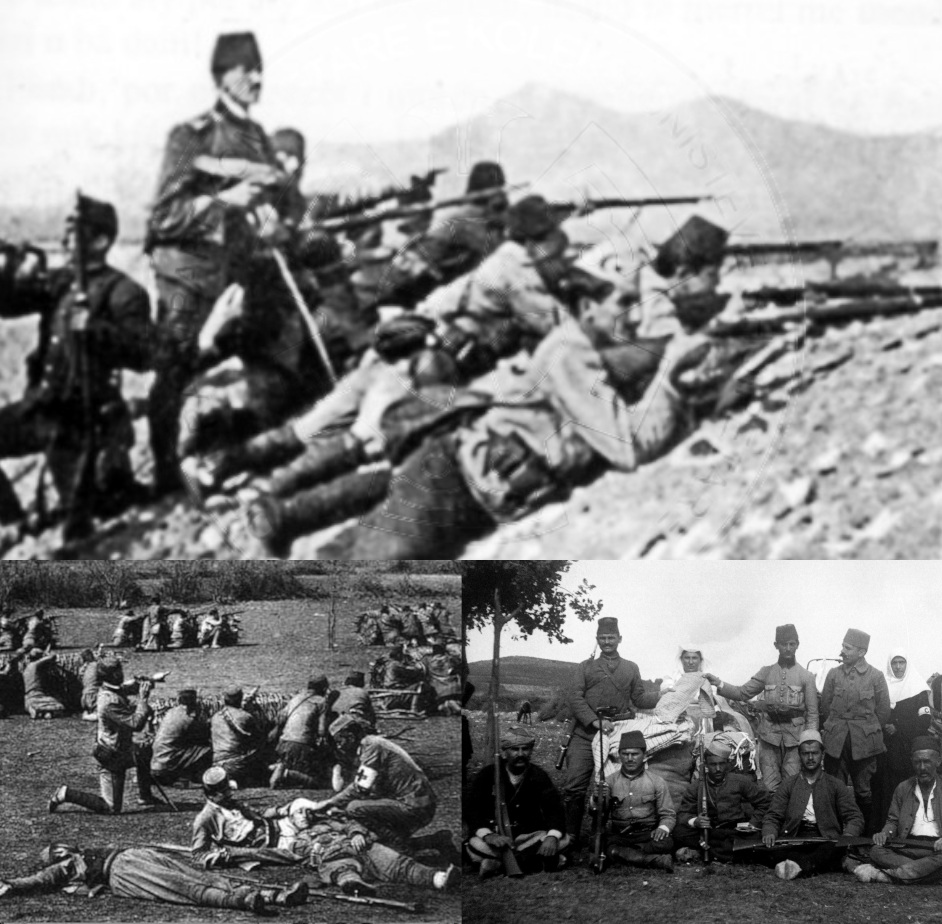
| Date | July 1920 – 14 February 1921 |
| Location | Koplik, Albania |
| Result | Inconclusive |

Belligerents
| Principality of Albania | Kingdom of Serbs, Croats and Slovenes |

Commanders and leaders
| Ahmet Zogu; Hamid Gjylbegu | Peter I Alexander I |

Units involved
| Kelmendi Tribesmen; Shkreli Tribesmen; Kastrati tribesmen | Yugoslav Army (Kingdom of Montenegro) Montenegrin irregulars |

Strength
| 3,000–3,500 tribesmen | Unknown |

The Koplik War (Albanian: Lufta e Koplikut) was a series of battles that occurred between Albania and the Kingdom of Serbs, Croats and Slovenes in 1920 and 1921.

== Background ==
After the retreat of Austria-Hungary on October 31, 1918, Shkodra was controlled by the military force of the victorious Allies of the First World War, commanded by the French general De Fortou. After the statement of the American president Woodrow Wilson for not leaving aside the issue of Albania's borders, the statement also stated that no territorial compensation would be accepted in Northern Albania in favor of the Yugoslavia. At the request of the government that emerged from the Lushnja Congress, on March 11, 1920, the French general left Shkodra under the management of the perlimitar and its chairman, Musa Juka.

== War ==
The conflict began due to tensions along the border demarcation line. According to Albanian sources, on July 26, 1920, armed groups from the Hoti and Gruda tribes, joined by volunteers, attacked Yugoslav border guards near Tuzi and crossed into Yugoslav-controlled territory.

In response to these border raids, Yugoslav forces launched a counter-offensive. Three Yugoslav battalions entered the region, pushing back the tribal fighters. Yugoslav troops successfully occupied Kelmendi, Kastrati, Shkreli, and reached Koplik. The Albanian volunteers were forced to retreat, and the Yugoslav army secured the strategic area north of Shkodër.

In August, Albanian forces attempted a counter-attack to regain the lost territories. While they briefly managed to enter Kastrati on August 19–20, the Yugoslav Army responded the following day with a reinforced offensive using artillery and machine guns. The Yugoslav forces inflicted significant losses on the Albanian irregulars and recaptured Kastrati, Shkreli, Kelmendi, and Koplik.

By the beginning of September, Yugoslav forces held firm control over the occupied territories holding the "strategic line". A ceasefire agreement was signed on September 20, 1920, in Shkodra while Yugoslav troops were still in possession of the contested zone. The eventual withdrawal of Yugoslav troops in February 1921 was not a result of military defeat but came after the intervention of the League of Nations and the Great Powers, who threatened sanctions if the border line of 1913 was not respected.

== Aftermath ==
Shortly after the War, the Kingdom of Yugoslavia supported the establishment of the Republic of Mirdita in its efforts to push for more advantageous border demarcation for Yugoslavia. Thus in July 1921 the Kingdom of Yugoslavia again invaded Albania and its forces became engaged, after clashes with Albanian tribesmen, in the northern part of the country. The League of Nations intervened and sent a commission of representatives from various powers in the region. In November 1921, the League decided that the frontiers of Albania should be the same as they had been in 1913, although the United Kingdom insisted on slight adaptations in the region of Debar, Prizren and Kastrati in the interest of Yugoslavia. Yugoslav forces withdrew and the Republic of Mirdita was extinguished by Albanian forces. In an effort to gain the favor of the Border Demarcation Commission the two countries established formal diplomatic relations in March 1922.
