= Kastrati =

Kastrati may refer to:

- Kastrati (tribe)
- Kastrati (surname)

== See also ==
- Kastrat (disambiguation)
