= Venera (disambiguation) =

Venera (Cyrillic: Венера) was a series of Soviet probes to Venus.

Venera may also refer to:

- Santa Venera, town in Malta
- Venera Terra, region on Pluto named for the Venera program

== People ==
- Saint Venera (born ?), Christian martyr
- Venera Chernyshova (born 1954), former Soviet biathlete
- Venera Getova (born 1980), Bulgarian discus thrower
- Venera Lumani (born 1991), Albanian singer from Macedonia
- Venera Zaripova (born 1966), former Soviet rhythmic gymnast
- Vénera Kastrati (born 1975), Albanian-Italian artist
