= Lirim =

- Gender: Male

Origin
- Region of origin: Albania

Lirim is a predominantly Albanian language masculine given name. Notable people bearing the name Lirim include:

- Lirim Hajrullahu (born 1990), Kosovan-Canadian gridiron football player
- Lirim Kastrati, multiple people
- Lirim Mema (born 1998), Kosovan footballer
- Lirim Qamili (born 1998), Albanian footballer
- Lirim Zendeli (born 1999), German racing driver
