= Vojo Kushi =

Albanian and Yugoslav partisan (1918–1942)

Vojo Kushi NK
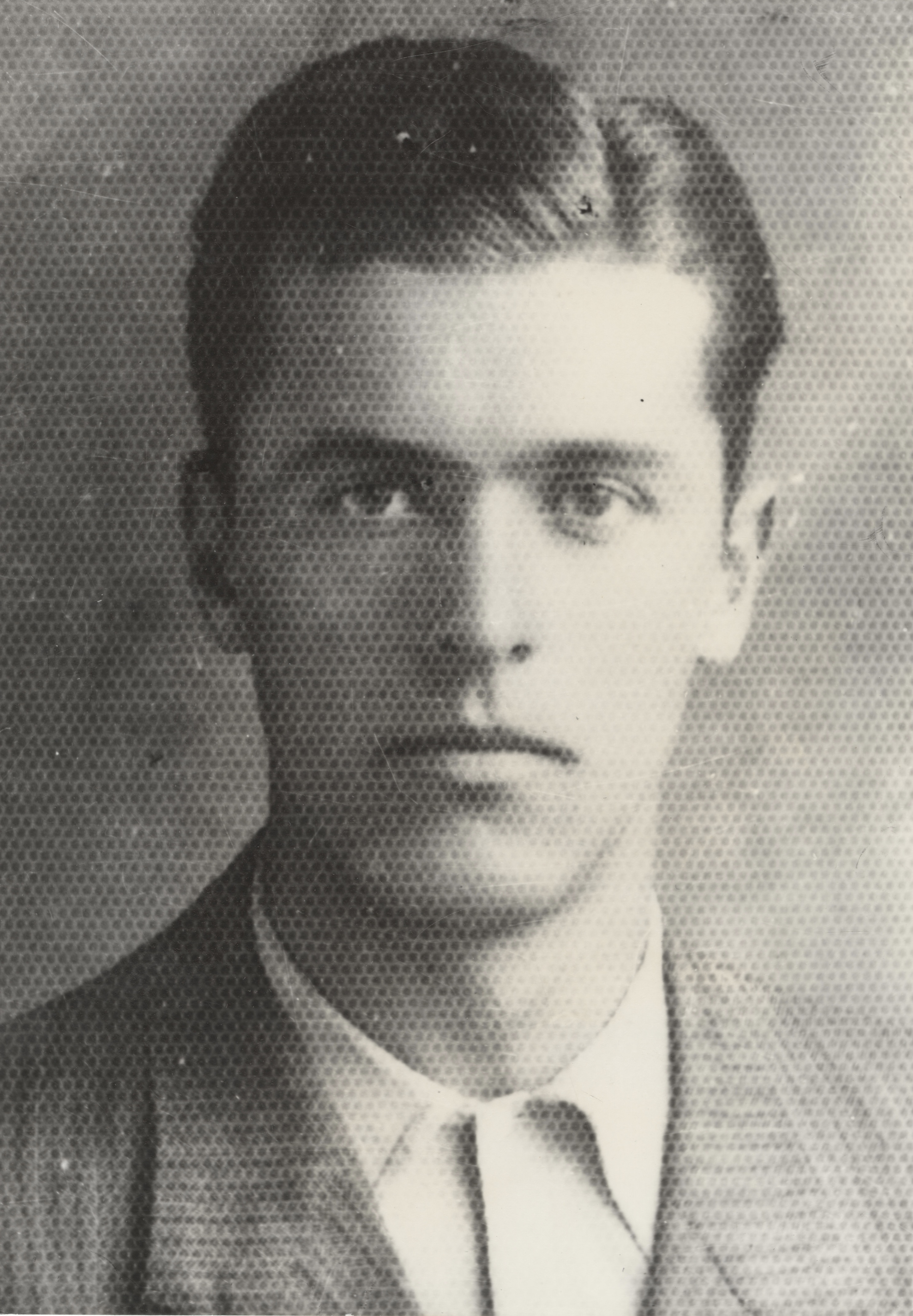
- Kushi in 1942
- Born: 3 August 1918; Vrakë, Shkodër, Austrian-occupied Albania
- Died: 10 October 1942 (aged 24); Tirana, Italian-occupied Albania
- Other name: Kušić
- Occupation: Albanian resistance in World War II
- Political party: Communist Party of Albania; Communist Party of Yugoslavia
- Awards: Hero of the People People's Hero (Yugoslav) (posthumous) Honor of the Nation

Vojo Kushi (Albanian pronunciation: ['vɔjɔ 'kuʃi]; Serbian Cyrillic: Војо Кушић, August 3, 1918 – October 10, 1942) was an Albanian and Yugoslav communist guerrilla fighter (partisan) and one of the founders of the Communist group based in Shkodër, following the Italian occupation of Albania in April 1939. He was proclaimed a National Hero of Yugoslavia by the Yugoslav communist government on February 12, 1945, and then a Hero of Albania by the Albanian communist government in 1946.

== Early life and origin ==
Kushi was born in 1918, in Vrakë, near Shkodër. He belonged to the Serb-Montenegrin minority of Albania. His original surname may have been Kušić (Serbian Cyrillic: Кушић); due to King Zog's state persecution of Serbs following 1920, surnames with obvious Slavic suffixes such as '-ić' and '-vić' were removed, as were Slavic-speaking schools.

== Biography ==
Following the Italian occupation of Albania in April 1939, the first communist revolutionary organization was established in Shkodër (Shkodër group), which included minority members brothers Vaso and Branko Kadija, Vojo Kushi, Jordan Misja, Ivo Jovanov, Vojin Dragović, Petar Bulatović and Vasil Shanto. The Shkodër group was led by Shanto and Qemal Stafa. The other organization, established in Korçë (Korçë group), was united into one on November 8, 1941, in Tirana, at the house of Bojko Lazarov, hence forming the Communist Party of Albania. In 1942, he was chosen as a member of the regional committee for Tirana and appointed commander of guerrilla units. Enver Hoxha was appointed the Party leader in order to include the majority Muslim population.

Kushi was sent by the Albanian government for education at the Military Academy in Belgrade, in the Kingdom of Yugoslavia. Before his return to Albania, he joined the Yugoslav Partisans and became a member of the Communist Party of Yugoslavia. One of the discussions of Partisans in Prokletije, including Kushi, was included in Đurica Labović's Lučonoša sa Prokletija (1985).

== Death ==
The Albanian fascist regime sentenced communist fighters to death for treachery and unrest. In Tirana, Qemal Stafa, and later Kushi, Sadik Stavileci and Xoxi Martini were surrounded and killed by carabinieri on 10 October 1942. Their house on the Kodra Kuqe quarter (Red Hill quarter) was surrounded and a fight ensued for 6 hours, with tanks forcing them out; Kushi stormed out and killed several carabinieri, then ran out of bullets and jumped onto the tank and was killed.

== Legacy ==
After the war, he was proclaimed a National Hero. In Albania, many streets, quarters, schools, sport institutions and others were named after him. In Tirana, a monument was erected in his honour, a statue of his face and his name below it. It is located in Sheshi Selvia, Tirana. An Albanian documentary about him, Vojo Kushi (1969), was made.

Later Hoxha imprisoned Vojo's brother Marko and his family in southern Albania as part of his party purges.

== Annotations ==
1. His given name, Vojo, is a shortened form of the Slavic name Vojislav. His surname, Kushi, is the Albanian form of Serbian Kušić (Serbian Cyrillic: Кушић. In Serbo-Croatian sources his name is written Vojo Kuši (Војо Куши), and Voja Kuši (Воја Куши).

== Sources ==
- Pearson, Owen (2006). Albania in the Twentieth Century, A History: Volume II: Albania in Occupation and War, 1939-45. I.B.Tauris. ISBN 978-1-84511-104-5.
