= Kusić =

Kusić (Serbian Cyrillic: Кусић) may have several meanings in Serbo-Croatian (Bosnian, Croatian, Serbian) usage, either as toponym or last name, found among several South Slavic ethnic groups in Bosnia and Herzegovina, Serbia, Croatia, and Slovenia (formerly Yugoslavia).

Kusić may also refer to:

== Places ==
- Kusić, Bela Crkva, a village near Bela Crkva, Serbia
- Kusići, Teslić, formerly a sub-village of the village Jezera, Teslić, Bosnia and Herzegovina

== People ==
- Filip Kusić (born 1996), Serbian-German footballer
- Grgo Kusić (1892–1918), Croat soldier in the Austro-Hungarian Army
- Larry Kusik, award-winning lyricist
- Zvonko Kusić (born 1946), Croatian physician, professor of oncology and nuclear medicine

== See also ==
- Kušić, surname
