= Kušić =

Kušić is a Serbian surname, derived from Kuša, a diminutive of the masculine given name Kuzman.

- Vojo Kushi (Kušić), Albanian national hero

== See also ==
- Kušići, village in Serbia
- Kušiljevo, village in Serbia
- Kusić (disambiguation)
- Kužić, surname
