= Witch of Kastrati =

The Witch of Kastrati (Albanian: Shtriga e Kastratit) is mentioned in connection with the murder of a woman by her husband in the village of Kastrat, Shkodër, Albania, around the year 1895. It is considered the only documented case of the "witch hunting" (persecution) of women in Albanian history.

The incident was documented by the French consul Alexandre Degrand in his book "Souvenirs de la Haute Albanie" (Memories of Upper Albania). According to Degrand's account, the woman was accused of witchcraft by her husband and subsequently killed by him. The method of murder involved burning her in a wooden tower. Specific details of the accusation and the murder itself remain unclear.
