= Dobër =

Settlement in Albania

- Village
- Location within Albania
- Coordinates: 42°11′14″N 19°26′54″E
- Country: Albania
- County: Shkodër
- Municipality: Malësi e Madhe
- Administrative unit: Qendër

Population
  - Total: 693
- Time zone: UTC+1 (CET)
  - Summer (DST): UTC+2 (CEST)

Dobër (also known as Dobre) is a settlement in the former Qendër municipality, Shkodër County, northern Albania. At the 2015 local government reform it became part of the municipality Malësi e Madhe. It has a population of 693.

== Economy ==
The local economy relies mainly on agriculture with approximately four small shops within the village as of 2017. The agricultural economy relies on small subsistence farming by small landholders. Farming activity mainly relies on cash crops and is used to both generate small incomes as well as for the provision of food stuffs for the grower and the family. Animal husbandry is rare as of 2017 with only one or two individuals still owning large flocks of sheep. Labour prices per day are around 1000 lek per day per labourer but can be as high as 1500 lek as of 2017. There are also two to five minivans that operate from Dober itself (depending on time of year). However, these are privately owned and operated mostly in the route from Koplik to Shkodër so use of this transport is dependent on walking a short distance to the main highway linking the village to other population centres.

Local residents have also made use of fishing due to the proximity of the lake Scutari. Due to depleting fish stocks from the illegal usage of electricity in fishing methods, fishing is now economically untenable.

In the early 2000s, Dober was at the forefront of a general wave of farming mechanization that has included the importing and use of various farming machinery from Italy and Montenegro. This has helped to greatly increase and maintain productivity in the face of a continuous exodus of young men who choose to immigrant either abroad or into the cities in order to seek economic advancement in none-farming industry. The use of pesticides is also very common in agriculture within the village.

As a result of emigration, -as of 2017 and years ago- the local economy benefits from a stream of income and hard currencies from emigrates. The extent of the emigrant contribution is unknown but is thought to makes up a sizeable part of the local economy since all large households currently have or have had at least one family member either abroad or in the large cities earning a good comparative income and contributing to the household maintenance. The village also benefits economically from the return of immigrants during the summer months with at least 15 to 25 people returning from the European Union and the United States every summer boosting the local economy. The impact of emigration has also meant that there are virtually no young men left in the village with the vast majority having left. This has contributed to a labour shortage and a reduction in the amount of land being cultivated much to the benefit of wildlife which has seen a rebound in recent years.

Many houses in the village (as of 2017) remain empty during most of the year and are used as summer homes by returning expats. These houses are generally in good condition and are maintained during the year by relatives or individuals paid to do so. A number of homes have recently been constructed by emigrants and wealthier individuals and are used as summer holiday homes thereby boosting the local construction industry.

== History ==
There are many indications of a long history of settlement. The earliest known mention of the village is in a map dating from early 1700.

Old ruins are visible in a number of locations, including at the local Catholic cemetery where the ruins of a church are visible. It is rumored that the church may contain hidden buried religious icons of precious metals buried during the incursion of the Ottomans in the 14th and 15th century. Locals have searched but found nothing.

More recent history can be seen, with an abundance of defensive bunkers and pillboxes scattered throughout the village and beyond. These were constructed from the 1960s onwards during periods of intense communist paranoia of a feared invasion from neighboring Yugoslavia. On the southern edge of the village lies a dried up artificial lake which was once used for irrigation. Close to the lake lie a number of clay hills, upon which is an old army base littered with pill boxes, bunkers and various tunnels and large underground rooms that remains abandoned, waterlogged and now largely unexplored.

== Population ==
The population is over 600. The village is divided between a large Catholic community and an equally sized Muslim community. Relations between the two are incredibly warm and good with both sides interacting without prejudice as far as celebrating each parties religious holidays respectfully and in many cases together. The village remains however geographically segregated in two portions with one being predominantly Catholic whilst the other culturally Muslim. The reasons for this are unsure but due to the pleasant relations between them, it appears to be as a result of the fact that the Muslim quarter is populated by around 5 large family groupings all tracing their descent to a common ancestor of the Cokaj clan hailing from Koplik I Siper with rumoured roots in the town of Kuci, Montenegro (a testament to the various migratory patterns by Alba-phone and Slavonic peoples during times of conflict in this border region). Intermarriage within the village is almost unheard of due to possible patrilinial blood relations within the Muslim community as well as the religious cultural divide between the Muslim and Catholic communities. Furthermore, there remains significant affluence of traditional arranged marriages which do not favor inter marriage within the same locality.

== Appearance ==
At first sighting, the town is seen with colourful villas facing the main road that runs through the village surrounded by small orchards filled with a variety of fruit trees and grape vines. As of 2017, these make up over half of the houses in the village and were mostly constructed during economic boom eras (with many still being works in progress). Most houses are surrounded, often by a wall varying in size with a complement of fencing over it. The purpose is protection of property from straying animals as well as potential crime and privacy.

There is a catholic church on the edge of the village built sometime in the 1990s on a substantial amount of land donated by the late Lap Gjoshi and Kolin Gjoshi. The motivation for such a large donation is thought to have been the often sites customary reason of 'redemption of their souls'. From the village there is a view of Lake Skadar in the north and west as well as the Albanian Alps in the East with a clear view of Rozafa Castle in the south. Visitors will notice the updated quality of the main road. As of 2017, it is the second time the road has been built in less than a decade. The last construction/major reparation of the main road occurred in the summer of 2009.

Additionally, there is a railway line running through the village. The main road runs over this line and care must be taken when crossing it as there is no barrier crossing.
