= Kosta Miličević =

Serbian painter

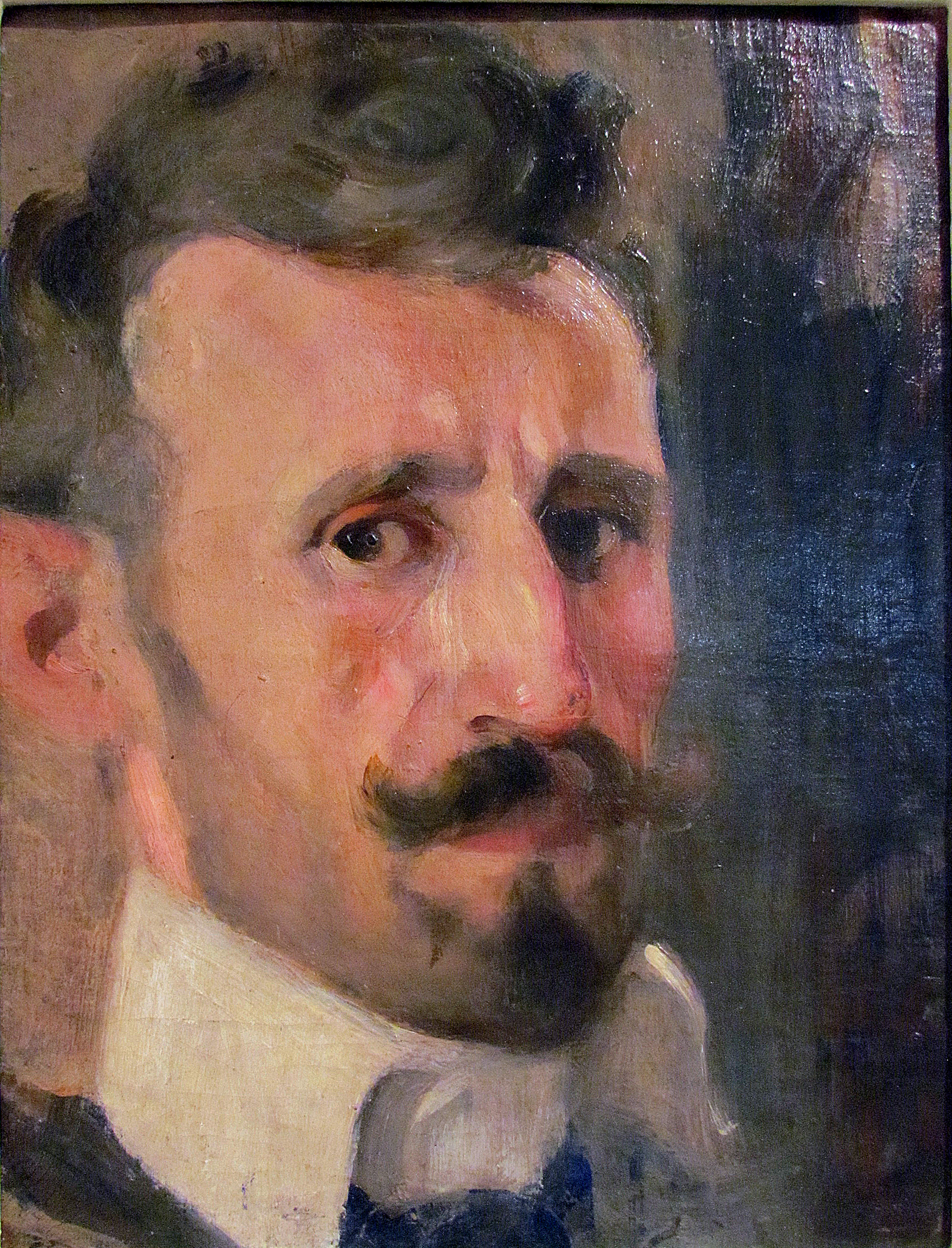
- Self-portrait
- Born: 3 June 1877; Vrakë, Ottoman Albania
- Died: 12 February 1920 (aged 42); Belgrade, Kingdom of Serbs, Croats and Slovenes
- Known for: Painting
- Movement: Impressionism

Kosta Miličević (Serbian Cyrillic: Коста Миличевић; 3 June 1877 – 12 February 1920) was a Serbian Impressionist painter, known mostly for his landscapes.

== Biography ==
Kosta Miličević was born to a clerical family, with a history of service in the priesthood. As a young man, he went to Belgrade, where he studied with Kiril Kutlik who operated a famous painting school. He continued his training, under difficult financial conditions, in Prague, Vienna, where he worked with the portrait painter, Heinrich Streblow (1862-1925) and Munich. Until 1910, he was an informal student at the arts and crafts school of Rista and Beta Vukanović. That same year, he became a member of Lada, an art association.

In his early period, he painted in the Academic style, as taught in Germany, then was attracted to Art Nouveau. After becoming acquainted with the works of Nadežda Petrović and Milan Milovanović, he sought to create a more personal style. He finally settled on a free, Impressionistic approach, brought to fruition during a stay at an artists' colony in Savinac (now part of Belgrade). His first success came at the Fourth Yugoslav Art Exhibition of 1912.

He was inducted into the army during World War I, briefly served as a soldier, then became an official War Painter for the Supreme Command in Corfu. Only five paintings are known to have survived from this period.

After the war, he taught evening classes at the Vukanovic's arts and crafts school. His early death was probably due to tuberculosis.

== Selected paintings ==
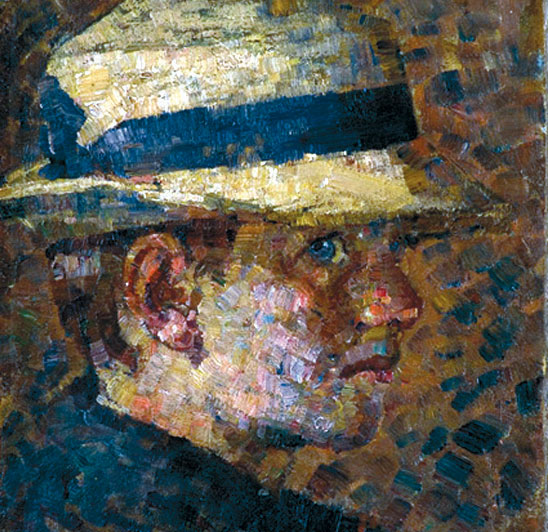
Boy with a White Hat

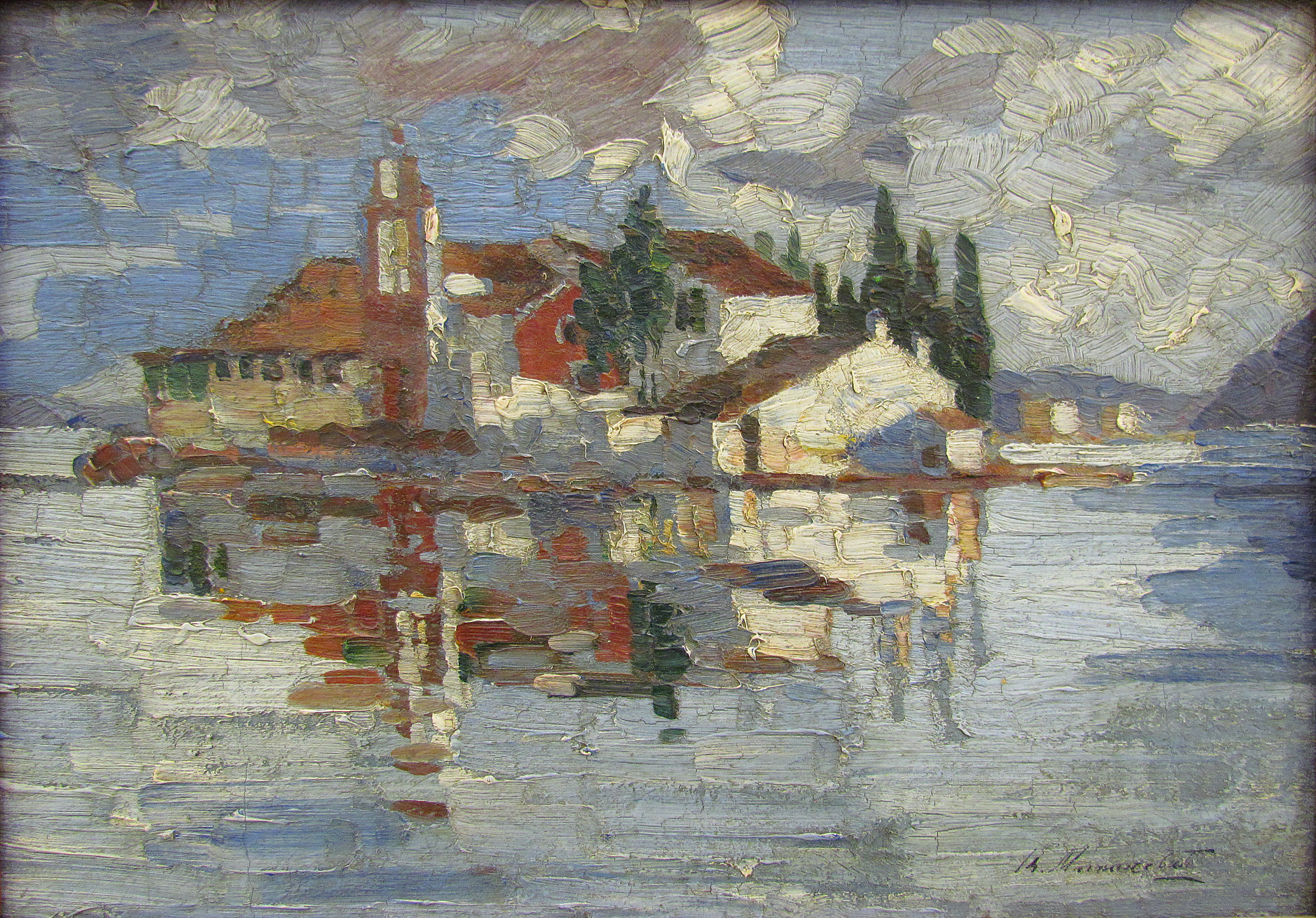
Landscape of Corfu

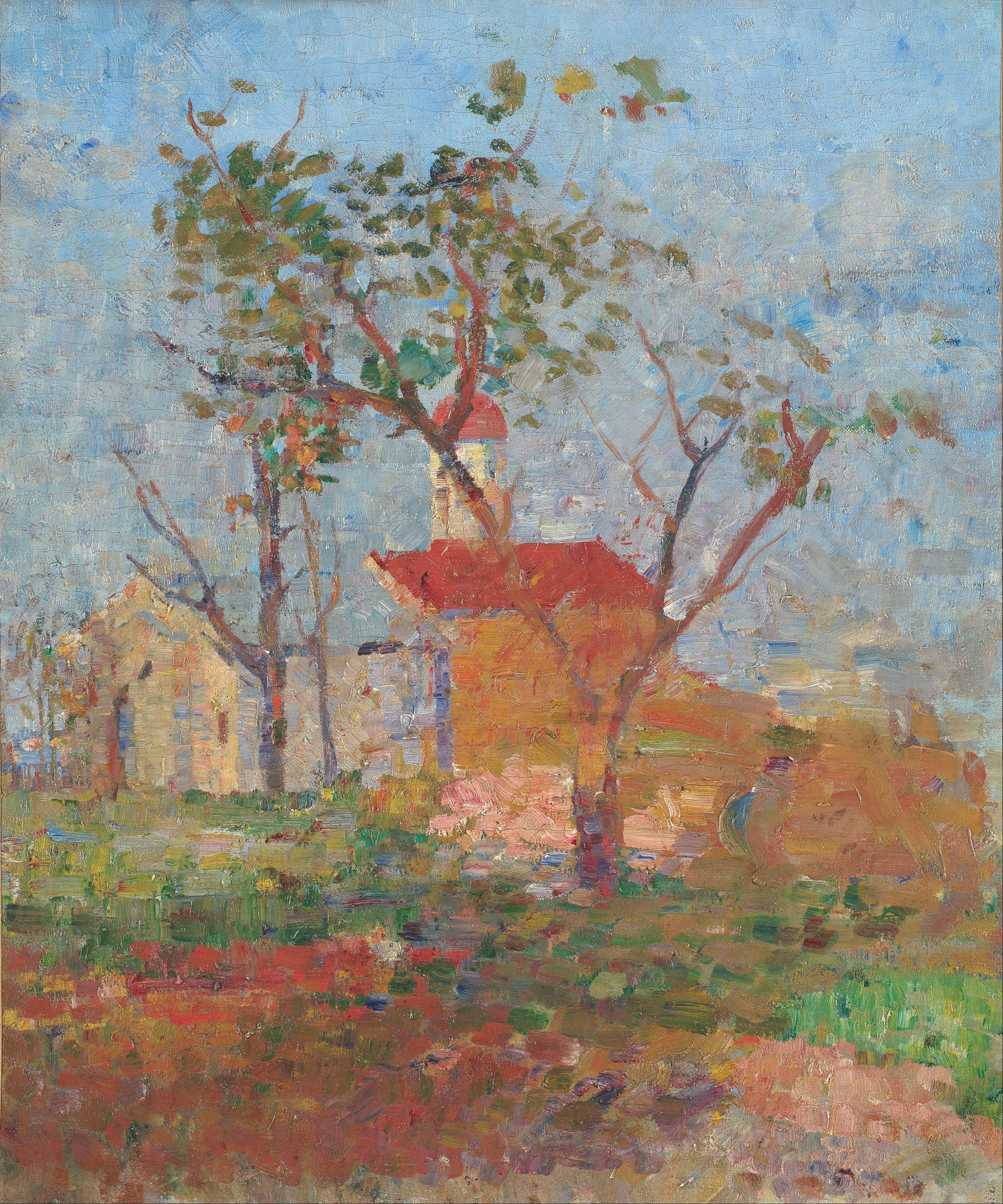
The Original Church of
Saint Sava

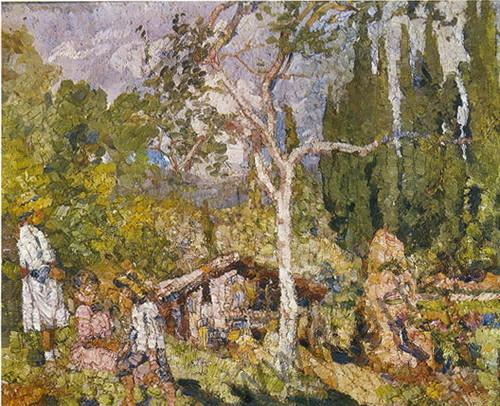
Potamós, on Corfu

== See also ==
- List of Serbian painters
- Serbo-Montenegrins in Albania
