= Boriç i Vogël =

Boriç i Vogël Mali Borič
- Village
- Location within Albania
- Coordinates: 42°7′52″N 19°30′0″E
- Country: Albania
- County: Shkodër
- Municipality: Malësi e Madhe
- Administrative unit: Gruemirë
- Time zone: UTC+1 (CET)
  - Summer (DST): UTC+2 (CEST)

Boriç i Vogël (Serbian: Мали Борич) is a settlement in the former Gruemirë municipality, Shkodër County, northern Albania. At the 2015 local government reform it became part of the municipality Malësi e Madhe. The village is inhabited by a majority of Serb-Montenegrins, and minority of Albanians, and is part of the wider Vraka region inhabited by the Serb-Montenegrins. The village is called Stari Borič or Mali Borič in Serbian.

== Demographics ==
During the early 2010s linguists Klaus Steinke and Xhelal Ylli seeking to corroborate villages cited in past literature as being Slavic speaking carried out fieldwork in settlements of the area. Boriç i Vogël in the Shkodër area is one of a number of villages with a Slavophone population that speak a Montenegrin dialect. The village Boriç i Vogël is inhabited by 15 families and the Slavophone families are the only compact group of the Orthodox in Vraka.

== History ==
In 1989 the Boriç i Vogël quarter was detached from the Boriç village. In 1995, during the Yugoslav Wars, it was reported that there were incidents of violence against the Serb-Montenegrin minority in places like Boriç i Vogël and Boriç i Madh, where the Albanian government also tried to forcibly take land from them. The Serb-Montenegrin minority in Shkodër and Malësia e Madhë claims to be treated unproperly. Albanian police detained a number of people from the village, after resumption of trial of Beqir Leshevic accused of spying for the Yugoslav secret service.
