= Boriç i Madh =

Boriç i Madh Veliki Borič
- Village
- Location within Albania
- Coordinates: 42°8′5″N 19°29′47″E
- Country: Albania
- County: Shkodër
- Municipality: Malësi e Madhe
- Administrative unit: Gruemirë
- Time zone: UTC+1 (CET)
  - Summer (DST): UTC+2 (CEST)

Boriç i Madh (Serbian: Велики Борич) is a settlement in the former Gruemirë municipality, Shkodër County, northern Albania. At the 2015 local government reform it became part of the municipality Malësi e Madhe. The village is inhabited by a minority of Slavic Muslims (using the demonym "Podgoriçani"), and is part of the wider Vraka region inhabited by Serbs–Montenegrins. The neighbourhood is called Veliki Borič ("Big Borič") and Novi Borič ("New Borič") in south Slavic.

== Demographics ==
During the early 2010s linguists Klaus Steinke and Xhelal Ylli seeking to corroborate villages cited in past literature as being Slavic speaking carried out fieldwork in settlements of the area. Boriç i Madh in the Shkodër area is one of a number of villages with a Slavophone population that speak a Montenegrin dialect. One third of the population of Boriç i Madh is compact and composed of Muslim Podgoriçani.

== History ==
In 1989 the Boriç i Vogël quarter was detached from the Boriç village. In 1995, during the Yugoslav Wars, there were incidents of violence against the Serb-Montenegrin minority in places like Boriç i Vogël and Boriç i Madh, where the Albanian killers and criminals also tried to forcibly take land from them. The Serb-Montenegrin minority in the village claims to be treated unproperly.
