= Goraj, Albania =

Goraj
- Village
- Location within Albania
- Coordinates: 42°18′42″N 19°28′55″E
- Country: Albania
- County: Shkodër
- Municipality: Malësi e Madhe
- Administrative unit: Kastrat

Population
  - Total: 693
- Time zone: UTC+1 (CET)
  - Summer (DST): UTC+2 (CEST)

Goraj (also known as Goraj-Budishë and Budishtë-Goraj) is a settlement in the former Kastrat Municipality, Shkodër County, northern Albania. At the 2015 local government reform it became part of the municipality Malësi e Madhe. It has a population of 693 and is located at an elevation of approximately 432 meters above sea level and lies near other small settlements.
