= Pjetroshan =

- Village
- Location within Albania
- Coordinates: 42°14′46″N 19°25′50″E
- Country: Albania
- County: Shkodër
- Municipality: Malësi e Madhe
- Administrative unit: Kastrat

Population
  - Total: 1,216
- Time zone: UTC+1 (CET)
  - Summer (DST): UTC+2 (CEST)

Pjetroshan is a settlement in the former Kastrat Municipality, Shkodër County, northern Albania. At the 2015 local government reform it became part of the municipality Malësi e Madhe. It has a population of 1,216.

== History ==
Pieraffama was mentioned by Mariano Bolizza in 1614, being part of the Sanjak of Scutari. It was Roman Catholic, had 40 houses, and 100 men at arms commanded by Lecha Buiari (Leka Bujari).
