= Qendër, Malësi e Madhe =

Qendër
- Administrative unit
- Location within Albania
- Coordinates: 42°14′N 19°23′E
- Country: Albania
- County: Shkodër
- Municipality: Malësi e Madhe
  - Administrative unit: 46.72 km^{2} (18.04 sq mi)

Population (2011)
  - Administrative unit: 4,740
  - Administrative unit density: 101/km^{2} (263/sq mi)
- Time zone: UTC+1 (CET)
  - Summer (DST): UTC+2 (CEST)

Qendër is a former municipality in the Shkodër County, northwestern Albania. At the 2015 local government reform it became a subdivision of the municipality Malësi e Madhe. The population at the 2011 census was 4,740.

== Settlements ==
There are 8 settlements within Qendër.

1. Bogiq
2. Dobër
3. Koplik i Sipërm
4. Lohe e Poshtme
5. Kalldrun
6. Stërbeq
7. Jubicë
8. Kamicë-Flakë
9. Polvare
