= Gruemirë =

- Administrative unit
- Location within Albania
- Coordinates: 42°12′N 19°28′E
- Country: Albania
- County: Shkodër
- Municipality: Malësi e Madhe
  - Administrative unit: 113.7 km^{2} (43.9 sq mi)

Population (2011)
  - Administrative unit: 8,890
  - Administrative unit density: 78.2/km^{2} (203/sq mi)
- Time zone: UTC+1 (CET)
  - Summer (DST): UTC+2 (CEST)

Gruemirë is a former municipality in the Shkodër County, northwestern Albania. At the 2015 local government reform, it became a subdivision of the municipality Malësi e Madhe. The population at the 2011 census was 8,890.

== Name ==
It is named after the settlement of Gruemirë which in turn takes its name from the legend of "Good women" which traditionally is translated good-mirë: women-grua (grue from dialect) and had its home territory in Gruemira. Gruemira is first mentioned in the cadaster of Venetian Shkodra in 1416. Traditionally, in Albanological research it has been seen as compound of grua (woman) and mirë (good). Another theory based in the rendering of the toponym in the defter of Scutari in 1485 as Kuruemira proposes an etymology as a compound of krua (well) + mirë (good). The people of the fis and the village of Gruemirë are called Gruemiras.

== Legend ==
The legend of "Good women"—Once upon a time, a small cottage was only one well away from there. A women went to the well. She had a long road home. Near her house a passing man (Trim-brave) was thirsty and asked the women for water. She helped and had to go back and take water again. From that time the settlement is called "The Good Women- Gruemirë", referring to all women from that cottage.

== Settlements ==
Gruemira is the biggest administrative unit on Albania, containing 15 settlements. There are 15 settlements within Gruemirë.

1. Boriç i Madh
2. Boriç i Vogël
3. Demiraj
4. Gjormë
5. Grilë
6. Grudë
7. Gruemirë
8. Ktosh
9. Kurtë
10. Linaj
11. Omaraj
12. Mëshqerrë
13. Rrash-Kullaj
14. Vajush
15. Vorfë

== Bibliography ==
- Filipović, Milenko (1982). Among the People, Native Yugoslav Ethnography: Selected Writing of Milenko S. Filipović. Michigan Slavic Publications, Department of Slavic Languages and Literatures. ISBN 9780930042479.
- Halimi, Mehmet (1986). "Toponimet kompozitore mesjetare në të folmet e sotme shqipe [Compounds in the toponymy of modern Albania]". Gjurmime Albanologjike. 15–16. Albanological Institute of Pristina.
