= Vraka =

Region in Shkodër County in northern Albania

Vraka (Albanian indefinite form: Vrakë, Serbian Cyrillic: Врака) is a region in Shkodër County in northern Albania. The region includes settlements located on the shore of Lake Scutari, some 7 km north of the city of Shkodër. This ethnographic region is inhabited by Serb-Montenegrins, Podgoriçani (Slavic Muslims) and Albanians; it used to be mainly inhabited by Serb-Montenegrins. A small Serbo-Montenegrin community migrated and established itself in Vraka during the late seventeenth and early eighteenth centuries. The majority of the Serbo-Montenegrin community came to Vraka, Albania from Montenegro during the interwar Zogist period following 1926 and later from 1938 until 1948. By the year 2010 most of the Orthodox families returned to Montenegro and Serbia. As of 2019, there are only a few families living there (less than five).

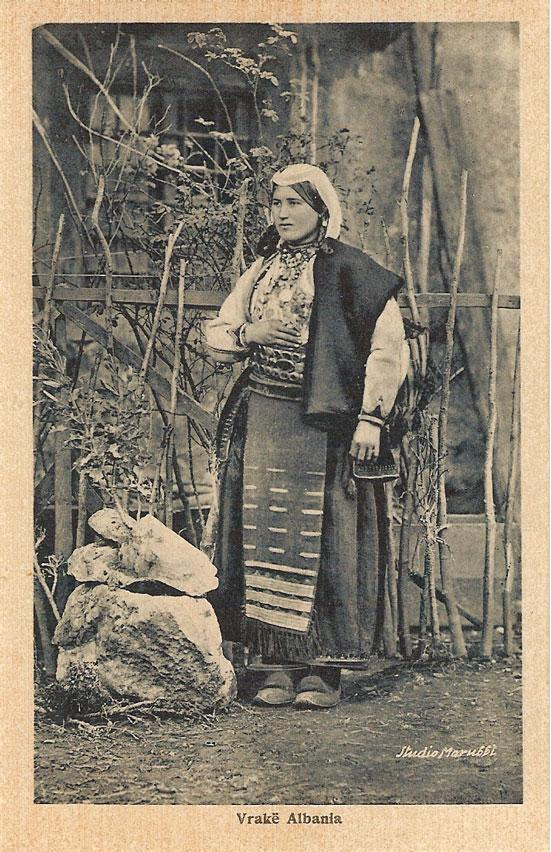
Woman from Vrakë.

== Settlements ==
- Boriç i Vogël (Stari Borič)
- Boriç i Madh (Mladi Borič)
- Rrash-Kullaj (Raš i Kula)
- Grilë (Grilj)
- Omaraj (Omara)
- Shtoj i Vjetër (Stari Štoj)
- Shtoj i Ri (Novi Štoj)

== History ==
=== Early history ===
The toponym is Slavic.

=== Modern history ===
Following the Great Eastern Crisis, from 1878 onward a small Muslim Montenegrin speaking community living in the region exists and are known as Podgoriçani, due to their origins from Podgorica in Montenegro.

Vraka is known for having been the place where poet Millosh Gjergj Nikolla became teacher on 23 April 1933, and it was in this period that he started to write prose sketches and verses.

In 1990 most of the minority community of Vraka went to Montenegro. As the border opened up, many members of the community left between March–December 1991 for Montenegro and Vraka, Boriç and other nearby areas became severely depopulated. During that time with economic problems and tensions arising in areas of the former Yugoslavia, it made some 600 of them return home to Albania.

During the Yugoslav Wars, there were incidents of violence against the Serb-Montenegrin minority in places like Boriç i Vogël and Boriç i Madh, where the Albanian government tried to forcibly take land from them. There were reports that the Albanian government also attempted to forcibly resettle Serb-Montenegrins and Podgoriçani from Boriç i Vogël, Boriç i Madh, Vraka and other places.

In March 1992, as part of state policy by Serbia and Montenegro to increase the numbers of Serbs in Kosovo, nearly 3,000 people from the Serb minority in Albania emigrated to the region after accepting a government offer for employment and housing in the area. Another wave came back due to the Kosovo War.

In the early twenty first century, the community lives largely on trade with Montenegro and communal relations with Albanian inhabitants are regarded as good by many of its members.

== Demographics ==
The region serves as the centre of the Serb-Montenegrin minority in Albania (as listed in the census). The estimations of the total number of Serb-Montenegrins in the area vary from 1,000 to over 2,000. The community has retained their language, culture and religion. The minority association of the community, the "Morača-Rozafa", represents the interests of this minority in Shkodër.

During the early 2010s linguists Klaus Steinke and Xhelal Ylli seeking to corroborate villages cited in past literature as being Slavic speaking carried out fieldwork in settlements of the area. Of the Shkodër area exists seven villages with a Slavophone population that speak a Montenegrin dialect.

- Boriç i Madh - one third of the population is compact and composed of Muslim Podgoriçani.
- Boriç i Vogël - inhabited by 15 families and the Slavophone families are the only compact group of the Orthodox in Vraka.
- Gril - the village officially has 1,090 inhabitants or 195 families, while the number of Orthodox Montenegrin families there varies between 2, 3 - 10. An Albanian school exists in Gril, along with a newly built Orthodox church that is without a priest. According to Slavophone locals the Orthodox population moved to Darragjat due to blood feuds related with Montenegro and relocated themselves to the Vraka area such as Gril between 1935 and 1936. Some Orthodox Montenegrins from the village moved to Montenegro in the 1990s with some thereafter returning to Gril.
- Omaraj - in the village only two Orthodox Montenegrin families remain.
- Kamicë - the village is almost deserted, with five or six minority Orthodox Montenegrin families left, alongside the few Albanian families.
- Shtoj i Ri - the village has a compact population of 17 Muslim Podgoriçani families.
- Shtoj i Vjetër - the village has a compact population of 30 Muslim Podgoriçani families.
- Shkodër (city) - some Orthodox Montenegrin and Muslim Podgoriçani families live there.

== Notable people ==
- Vojo Kushi – Albanian communist guerilla
- Kosta Miličević – Serbian painter
