= Kastrat (settlement) =

- Village
- Location within Albania
- Coordinates: 42°21′9″N 19°29′21″E
- Country: Albania
- County: Shkodër
- Municipality: Malësi e Madhe
- Administrative unit: Kastrat

Population
  - Total: 682
- Time zone: UTC+1 (CET)
  - Summer (DST): UTC+2 (CEST)

Kastrat is a settlement in the former Kastrat Municipality, Shkodër County, northern Albania. At the 2015 local government reform it became part of the municipality Malësi e Madhe. It has a population of 682. Its name contains the Albanian suffix -at, widely used to form toponyms from personal names and surnames.
