= Vukpalaj =

- Village
- Location within Albania
- Coordinates: 42°18′59″N 19°27′8″E
- Country: Albania
- County: Shkodër
- Municipality: Malësi e Madhe
- Administrative unit: Kastrat

Population
  - Total: 230
- Time zone: UTC+1 (CET)
  - Summer (DST): UTC+2 (CEST)

Vukpalaj (also known as Vukpalaj-Bajzë) is a settlement in the former Kastrat Municipality, Shkodër County, northern Albania. At the 2015 local government reform it became part of the municipality Malësi e Madhe. It has a population of 768.
