= Kastrat (municipality) =

- Administrative unit
- Location within Albania
- Coordinates: 42°17′N 19°26′E
- Country: Albania
- County: Shkodër
- Municipality: Malësi e Madhe
  - Administrative unit: 128.70 km^{2} (49.69 sq mi)

Population (2011)
  - Administrative unit: 6,883
  - Administrative unit density: 53.48/km^{2} (138.5/sq mi)
- Time zone: UTC+1 (CET)
  - Summer (DST): UTC+2 (CEST)

Kastrat is a former municipality in the Shkodër County, northwestern Albania. At the 2015 local government reform it became a subdivision of the municipality Malësi e Madhe. The population at the 2011 census was 6,883.

== Name ==
Its name contains the Albanian suffix -at, widely used to form toponyms from personal names and surnames.

== Settlements ==
There are 12 settlements within Kastrat, of which Bajzë maintains city status.

1. Marshej
2. Bajzë
3. Bratosh
4. Goraj
5. Gradec
6. Hot
7. Ivanaj
8. Jeran
9. Kastrat
10. Pjetroshan
11. Rrapshë
12. Vukpalaj
13. Rrogom

== See also ==
- Kastrati
- Kastrati (tribe)
- Witch of Kastrati
