= Grilë =

Grilë Grilj
- Village
- Location within Albania
- Coordinates: 42°7′52″N 19°29′8″E
- Country: Albania
- County: Shkodër
- Municipality: Malësi e Madhe
- Administrative unit: Gruemirë
- Time zone: UTC+1 (CET)
  - Summer (DST): UTC+2 (CEST)

Grilë (Serbian: Гриљ) is a settlement in the former Gruemirë municipality, Shkodër County, northern Albania. At the 2015 local government reform it became part of the municipality Malësi e Madhe. It is part of the Vraka region, and is inhabited by a minority of Montenegrins, who call the village Grilj.

== History ==
=== 2010s ===
During the early 2010s linguists Klaus Steinke and Xhelal Ylli seeking to corroborate villages cited in past literature as being Slavic speaking carried out fieldwork in settlements of the area. Grilë in the Shkodër area is one of a number of villages with a Slavophone population that speak a Montenegrin dialect.

The village of Grilë officially has 1,090 inhabitants or 195 families, whereas the number of Orthodox Montenegrin families ranges between two, three and ten. An Albanian school exists in Grilë along with a newly built Orthodox church that is without a priest. According to Slavophone locals, the Orthodox population moved from Montenegro to Darragjat, due to blood feuds and later between 1935 and 1936, they relocated themselves to the Vraka area in places such as Grilë. Some Orthodox Montenegrins from the village moved to Montenegro in the 1990s with some thereafter returning to Grilë .
