= Vénera Kastrati =

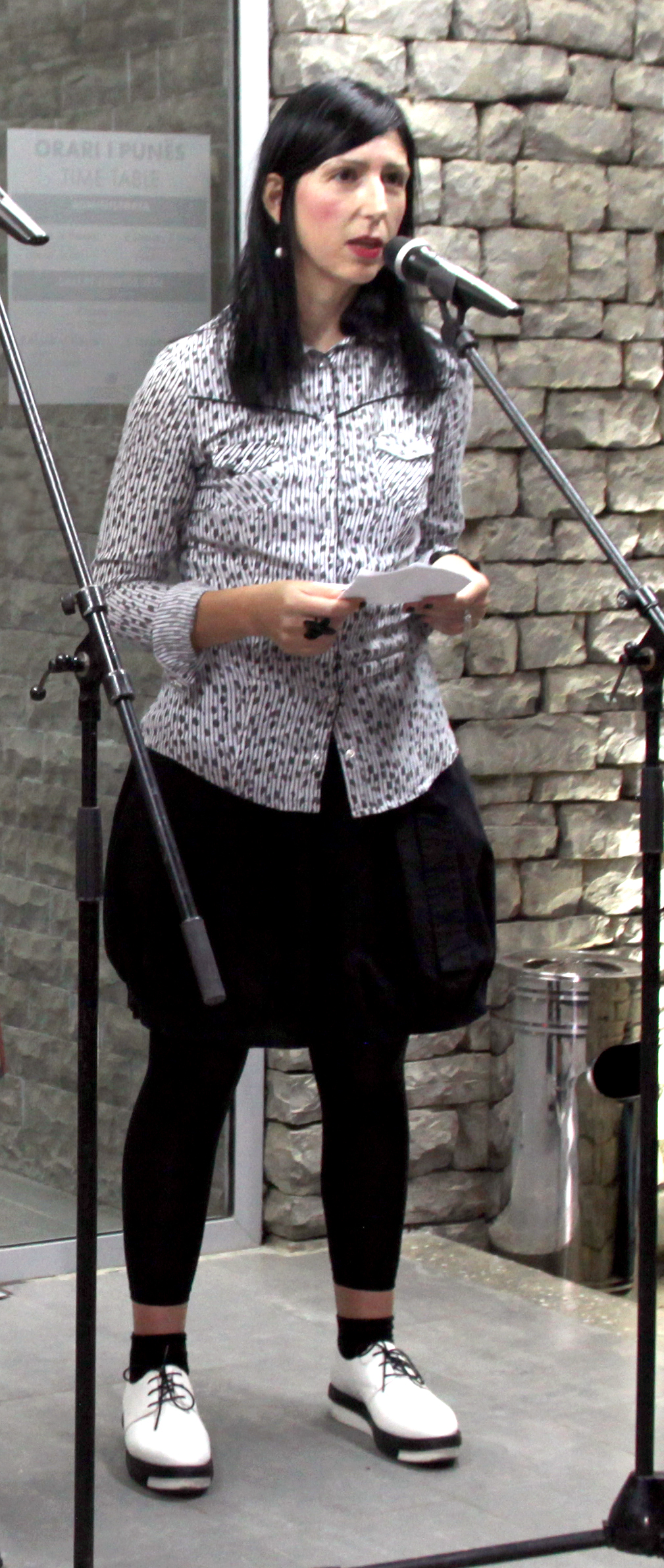
- Vénera Kastrati in 2016.
- Born: 1975 (age 50–51); Tirana, Albania
- Known for: Multimedia art
- Website: venerakastrati.it

Vénera Kastrati is an Albanian contemporary artist.

Her work was included in a charity auction at the Museo Marino Marini in Florence in 2011, and was shown at the twenty-fifth Alexandria Biennial in Egypt in 2009–2010.
