= Omaraj =

Omaraj Omara
- Village
- Location within Albania
- Coordinates: 42°8′46″N 19°29′16″E
- Country: Albania
- County: Shkodër
- Municipality: Malësi e Madhe
- Administrative unit: Gruemirë
- Time zone: UTC+1 (CET)
  - Summer (DST): UTC+2 (CEST)

Omaraj (also known as Omarë, Serbian: Омара) is a settlement in the former Gruemirë municipality in Shkodër County, northern Albania. At the 2015 local government reform it became part of the municipality Malësi e Madhe.

== Demographics ==
During the early 2010s, the linguists Klaus Steinke and Xhelal Ylli, seeking to corroborate villages cited in past literature as being Slavic-speaking, carried out fieldwork in settlements of the area. Omaraj in the Shkodër area is one of a number of villages with a Slavophone population that speaks a Montenegrin dialect. In the village of Omaraj, only two Orthodox Montenegrin families remain.
