= Lirim Kastrati =

Lirim Kastrati may refer to:

- Lirim Kastrati (footballer, born January 1999), also known as Lirim M. Kastrati, football player
- Lirim Kastrati (footballer, born February 1999), also known as Lirim R. Kastrati, football player
