= Koplik =

- Administrative unit
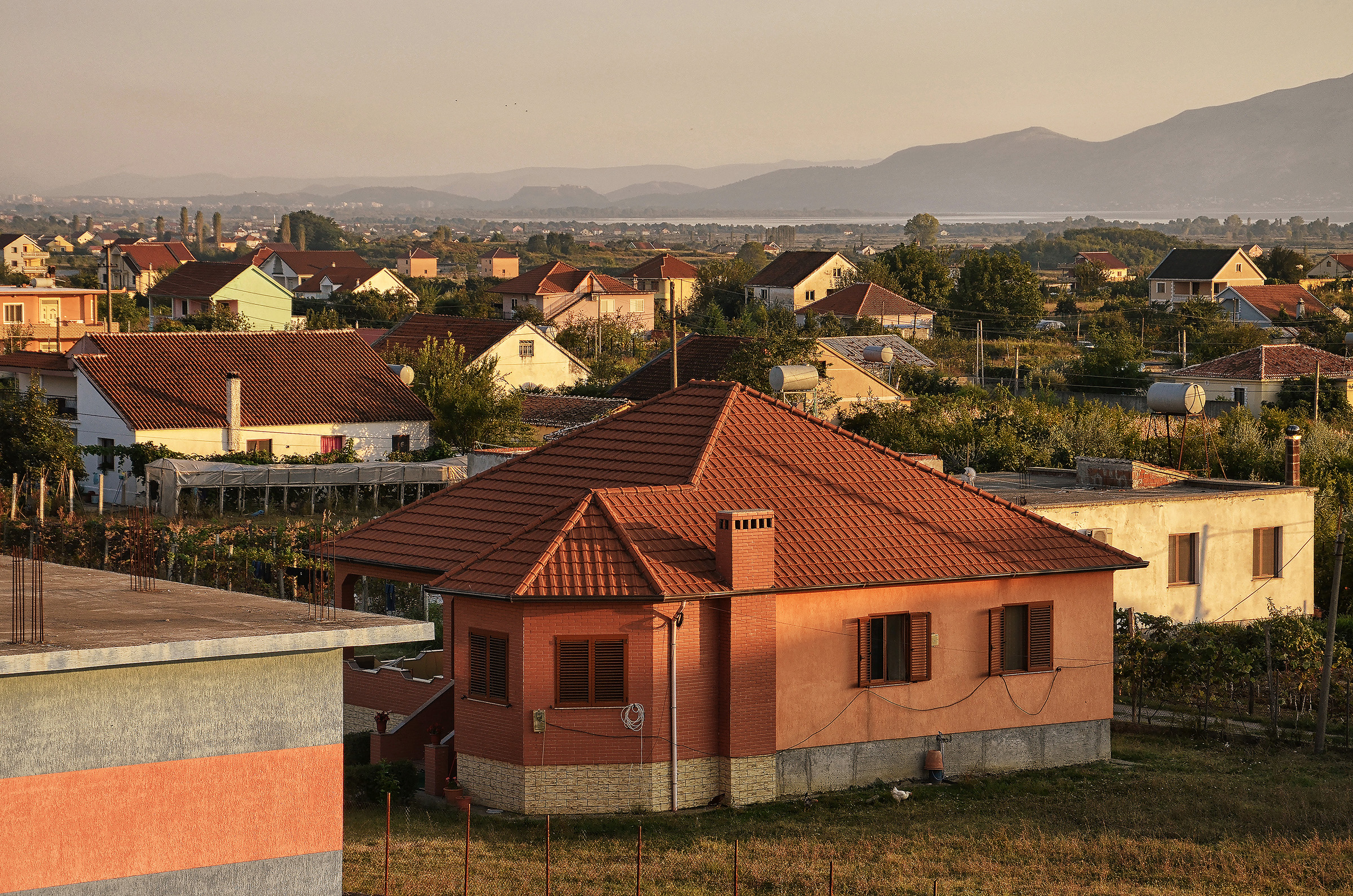

- Location within Albania
- Coordinates: 42°12′49″N 19°26′11″E
- Country: Albania
- County: Shkodër
- Municipality: Malësi e Madhe
  - Administrative unit: 9.3 km^{2} (3.6 sq mi)
- Elevation: 62 m (203 ft)

Population (2011)
  - Administrative unit: 3,734
  - Administrative unit density: 400/km^{2} (1,000/sq mi)
- Time zone: UTC+1 (CET)
  - Summer (DST): UTC+2 (CEST)
- Postal Code: 4301
- Area Code: 0211
- Website: kopliku.org

Koplik (also known as Koplik i Poshtëm) is a town and former municipality in northwestern Albania. At the 2015 local government reform, it became a subdivision, and the seat of the municipality Malësi e Madhe. It was the seat of the former Malësi e Madhe District. The population at the 2011 census was 3,734. It is situated north of the city of Shkodër. As of June 2016, Koplik has been registered and administered as an international 'free economic trade zone' by the Albanian government.

== Name ==
The name occurs as Cupelnich around 1200 in the work of Presbyter Diocleas; Kupêlnik in 1348; Copenico in 1416; Chopilich in 1614 in the report of the Venetian writer Mariano Bolizza; Coppilico on the 1688 map of the Venetian cartographer Francesco Maria Coronelli; Coplico on the 1689 map of the Italian cartographer Giacomo Cantelli da Vignola; and as Copelico in the 1703 report of the Catholic Archbishop of Bar [Antivari], Vincentius Zmajevich.

== History ==
Cupionich was mentioned by Mariano Bolizza in 1614, being part of the Sanjak of Scutari. It was Roman Catholic, had 60 houses, and 130 men at arms commanded by Pecha Campersa.

Koplik, being a border town, has a long history of warfare. The historical importance of Koplik owes much to the Malësor tribesmen. Their fierce independent nature insured that Koplik was often embroiled in wars against the Ottomans and the Serbs though much of its history. In the town itself there is a monument commemorating the Koplik War which took place in 1920 when the Albanian forces successfully defeated the Yugoslav forces. After the first world war and the partition of Malsia e Madhe into two component parts, the area surrounding Tuzi was given to the Kingdom of Montenegro whilst the area around Koplik remained Albanian with Koplik being created the regional capital of Malsia e Madhe. During the Ottoman occupation, many of the inhabitants of the town converted to Islam, although the rural population in Malësia e Madhe continued to be mainly Catholic. The communist regime put heavy restrictions on mobility but after the fall of communism in 1991, Koplik experienced a great influx of new settlers from the countryside.

In 1984, Koplik was elevated to city status, with a municipality granted following the first democratic elections on 26 July 1992.

== Tourism ==
Lake Shkodër and the mountainous areas of the Malëia e Madhe are recreational areas. Koplik receives hundreds if not thousands of tourists every year. These are however mainly expatriate immigrants returning to see family. Koplik and the surrounding areas have seen investment with a casino as well as restaurants being built to accommodate the increased demand from the tourist influx during the summer months. Koplik is a starting point for hikers wishing to explore the literary famous Malsia e Madhe, translated in English as the "Great Highlands" which receive much literary attention most famously in the travels of the early female anthropologist Edith Durham in her book High Albania as well as others including Lord Byron, Margaret Hasluck and many native figures. Malsia e Madhe is an area that offers hiking opportunities.

== Transport ==
Roads were poor; however in recent years, government investment has improved the central highway running through the province as well as the asphalting of most village roads. There is no availability to passenger trains from Koplik itself. The main method of public transportation is the use of minibuses on the main highway with one arriving every 3 to 5 minutes on average. Each minibus is usually privately owned and operated so there are no fixed fares as such; passengers are expected to pay the market price depending on the length of journey with the price from Koplik to the village of Dober (about a 2 to 3-mile journey) being around 20 lek.

== Economy ==
Koplik is the trading center of Malsia e Madhe. It is generally the place where from the rural villages go for anything from buying household items, clothing and other everyday things to attaining services such as health care, haircuts etc. As a result, Koplik is filled with shops, restaurants and hardware stores as well as Internet cafes and a casino. It has branches from the major banks operating in Albania. It also has a variety of business from a few hunting shops for the purchase of licensed fire arms and ammunition to mobile phone shops, bureau de change to a variety of high-street stores to be found in most major settlements. Further, the main high school for the surrounding villages is located there. As a result of Koplik's trade and administrative center status, it benefits from a constant influx of people from the surrounding area. It is also a transport hub as it is somewhat of a gateway into the deep valleys of Malsia itself and therefore a place of congregation for the various minibuses with at least half a dozen being present there at any time in the day.

== Sports ==
The football city club is KS Veleçiku Koplik.

== Administration ==
The municipality of Koplik has its own website, kopliku.org, which allows users to see who is employed by the local government and also view its budget and other administrative information.
