= Malësi e Madhe =

Municipality in Albania

- Municipality
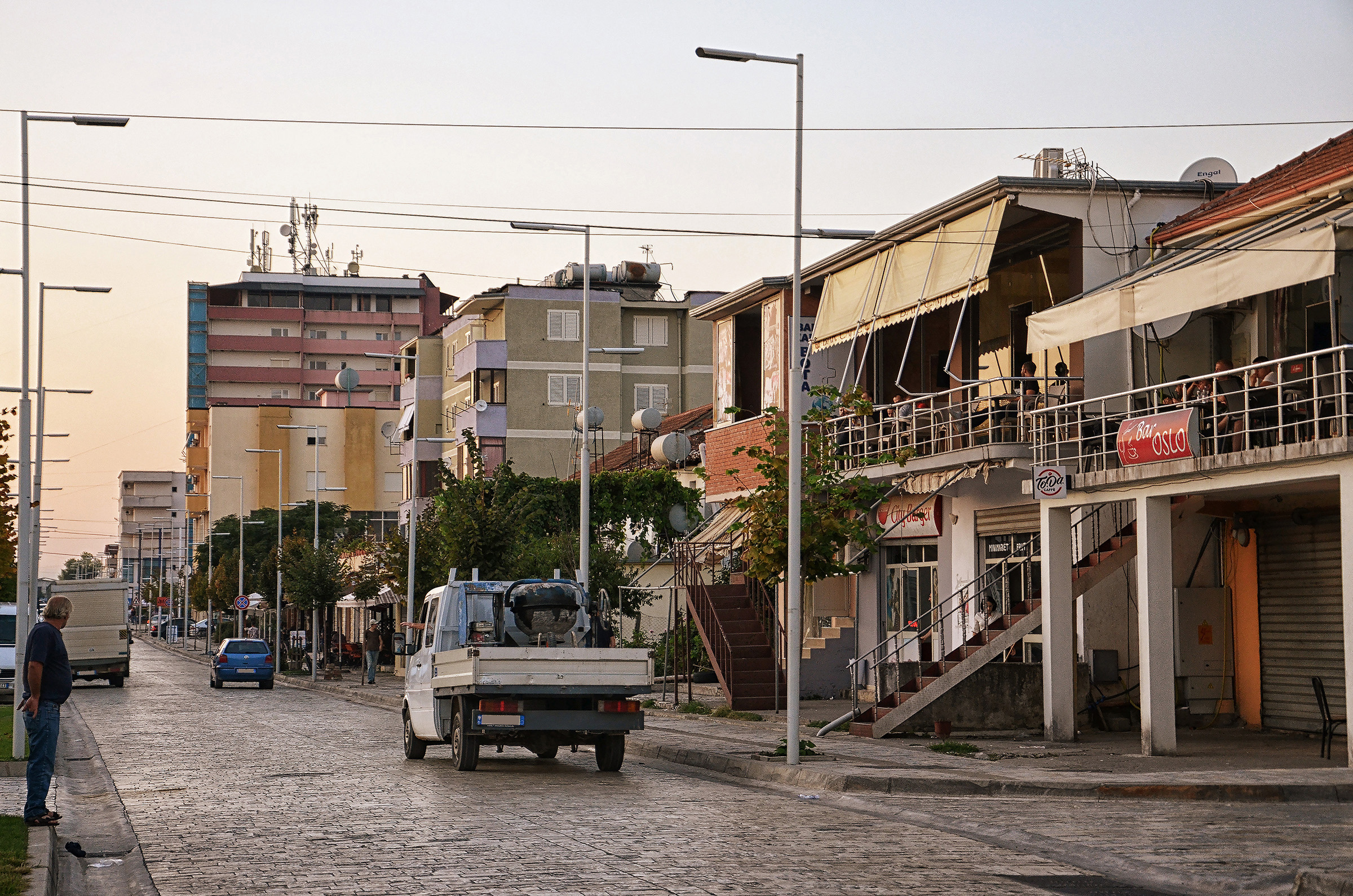
- Central Square of Koplik

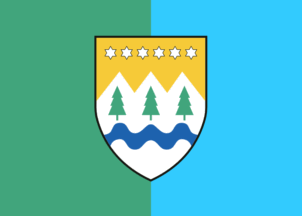
- Flag Emblem

- Location within Albania
- Coordinates: 42°12′49″N 19°26′11″E
- Country: Albania
- County: Shkodër
- Seat: Koplik

Government
  - Mayor: Tonin Marinaj (PS)

Area
  - Municipality: 951.01 km^{2} (367.19 sq mi)

Population (2023)
  - Municipality: 21,684
  - Municipality density: 22.801/km^{2} (59.054/sq mi)
- Time zone: UTC+1 (CET)
  - Summer (DST): UTC+2 (CEST)
- Postal Code: 4301
- Area Code: (0)211
- Website: bashkiamalesiemadhe.gov.al

Malësi e Madhe (Albanian pronunciation: [maˈləsi ɛ maˈðɛ]) is a municipality in Shkodër County, in northwestern Albania. The municipality consists of the administrative units of Gruemirë, Kastrat, Kelmend, Qendër, Shkrel with Koplik constituting its seat. As of the Institute of Statistics estimate from the 2011 census, there were 30,823 people residing in Malësi e Madhe Municipality. The area of the municipality is 951.01 km^{2}.
