= Regions of Albania =

Regions of Albania

The regions of Albania—apart from the official present and historical administrative divisions—include the following:

== Divisions ==
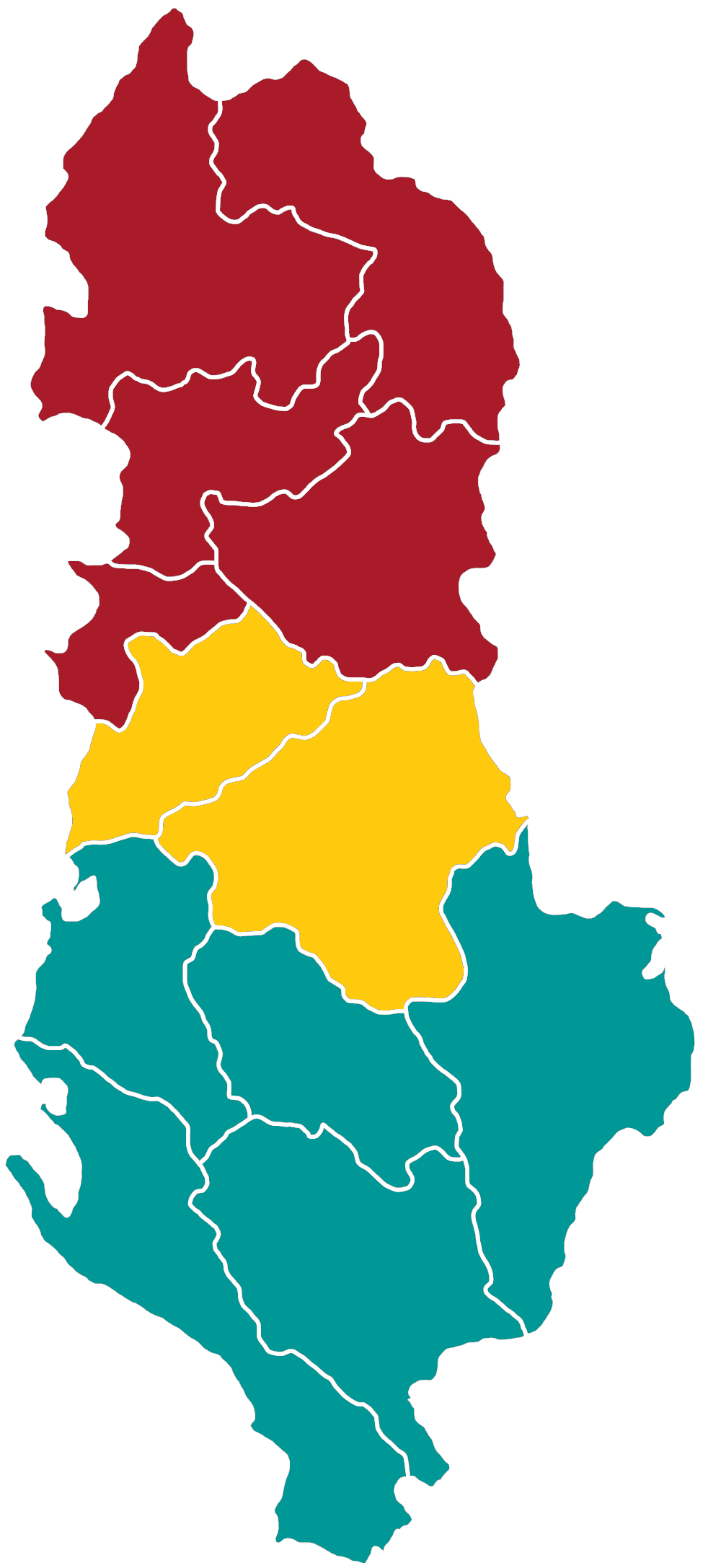
NUTS-2 regions of Albania

In cultural geography, there are two major ethnographic regions of Albania, divided by the Shkumbin River:

- Northern Albania or Ghegeria (Gheg Albanians)
- Southern Albania or Toskeria (Tosk Albanians)

In tourism geography, Albania can be divided into three regions:

- Coastal Albania – the long narrow strip between about 10 and 30 km wide along the whole Albanian coast, bordering both the Adriatic Sea and Ionian Sea
  - Albanian Adriatic Sea Coast
  - Albanian Ionian Sea Coast
    - Albanian Riviera
- North-eastern Albania – the inland region to the north of the Shkumbin River, bordering Kosovo, Montenegro, and North Macedonia
- South-eastern Albania – the inland region to the south of the Shkumbin River, bordering Greece and North Macedonia, and including the great border lakes, Lake Ohrid and Lake Prespa

=== Albanian Wikipedia ===
The Albanian Wikipedia lists the following regions:

- Rajoni Juglindor - The region of the south east.
- Nënrajoni Verilindor i Shqipërisë - Other regions in the northeast.
- Ultësira Perëndimore e Shqipërisë - Western region of Albania

The main article, Gjeografia e Shqipërisë, mentions the following logical divisions:

- Alpet Shqiptare (Albanian Alps)
- Krahina malore qendrore (the Hill Country in the centre)
- Ultësira bregdetare (Coastal Lowlands)

=== NUTS statistical regions of Albania ===
The Nomenclature of Territorial Units for Statistics (NUTS) divides Albania into three statistical regions:

- Central Albania
  - Elbasan County
  - Tirana County
- Northern Albania
  - Dibër County
  - Durrës County
  - Kukës County
  - Lezhë County
  - Shkodër County
- Southern Albania
  - Berat County
  - Fier County
  - Gjirokastër County
  - Korçë County
  - Vlorë County

== Cities ==
1. Elbasan
2. Tirana (the capital city)
3. Durrës (a coastal city)
4. Kavajë
5. Shkodër

== Coastal Albania ==
=== Cities ===
1. Kavajë
2. Fier
3. Lezhë
4. Sarandë
5. Shëngjin
6. Vlorë

=== Popular cities ===
1. Elbasan
2. Durrës

== North-eastern Albania (Shqipëri Verilindore) ==
=== Cities ===
1. Bajram Curri
2. Krujë
3. Kukës
4. Peshkopi
5. Pukë

=== Mountains ===
1. Dajt
2. Gjallica
3. Maja Jezercë
4. Korab
5. Maja e Malësores
6. Maja e Moravës

== South-eastern Albania ==
=== Cities ===
1. Berat
2. Gjirokastër
3. Korçë
4. Librazhd
5. Kuçovë
6. Përmet
7. Pogradec
8. Tepelenë

=== Mountains ===
1. Gramos
2. Mali i Thatë
3. Nemerçkë
4. Ostrovicë
5. Tomorr

== See also ==
- Greater Albania
