= List of counties of Albania by GDP =

Comparison of the gross domestic product of Albanian counties

The gross domestic product (GDP) of the counties of Albania varies from one county to another as the economic development of Albania varies between the country's geographic regions reflecting historic developments, infrastructure available, especially routes of transportation, and diverse geographic setting of various parts of the country.

== County nominal GDP per capita ==
Counties of Albania by GDP per capita, in Euro
County	2008	2009	2010	2011	2012	2013	2014	2015	2016	2017	2018	2023
Berat	2,165	2,120	2,369	2,529	2,426	2,510	2,693	2,858	3,101	3,381	3,628	5,516
Dibër	1,658	1,656	1,798	1,871	2,189	2,232	2,370	2,577	2,798	2,978	3,374	5,479
Durrës	3,196	3,027	3,508	3,282	3,347	3,352	3,330	3,596	3,726	4,070	4,412	10,001
Elbasan	2,025	1,978	2,325	2,285	2,290	2,439	2,521	2,480	2,652	2,799	3,119	6,004
Fier	2,633	2,447	2,805	3,361	3,855	4,071	4,348	3,955	3,917	4,120	4,697	9,596
Gjirokastër	2,237	2,215	2,460	3,096	3,470	3,455	3,672	3,569	3,746	3,989	4,433	7,864
Korçë	2,065	2,012	2,091	2,367	2,466	2,514	2,587	2,643	2,914	2,975	3,284	6,096
Kukës	1,999	1,981	2,139	2,416	2,416	2,578	2,328	2,273	2,305	2,514	2,836	5,056
Lezhë	2,064	1,998	2,016	2,078	2,292	2,203	2,510	2,594	2,874	2,946	3,162	6,391
Shkodër	2,117	2,076	2,294	2,507	2,510	2,451	2,446	2,615	2,784	2,888	3,216	7,100
Tirana	4,911	4,575	4,741	4,518	4,566	4,453	4,600	4,913	5,034	5,557	6,140	12,589
Vlorë	2,998	2,867	2,887	3,338	3,169	3,067	3,108	3,084	3,369	3,425	3,837	8,960
Source: Instituti i Statistikës (INSTAT)
