= NUTS statistical regions of Albania =

Overview of Albanian NUTS statistical regions

The Nomenclature of Territorial Units for Statistics (NUTS) is a geographical standard used by Albania in order to divide its territory into regions at three different levels of specified classes of its population codified by the Albanian Institute of Statistics (INSTAT). Albania is a recognised candidate country for membership of the European Union (EU) and thus part of the classification. The three hierarchical levels are known as NUTS-1, NUTS-2 and NUTS-3, moving from larger to smaller territorial divisions.

== Overall ==
Level	Division	#
NUTS 1	Albania	
NUTS 2	Regions	3
NUTS 3	Counties	12

== Regions ==
The NUTS codes are as follows:

NUTS-1	Code	NUTS-2	Code	NUTS-3	Code
Albania	AL0				
Albania	AL0	Northern Albania	AL01	Dibër County	AL011
Albania	AL0	Northern Albania	AL01	Durrës County	AL012
Albania	AL0	Northern Albania	AL01	Kukës County	AL013
Albania	AL0	Northern Albania	AL01	Lezhë County	AL014
Albania	AL0	Northern Albania	AL01	Shkodër County	AL015
Albania	AL0	Central Albania	AL02	Elbasan County	AL021
Albania	AL0	Central Albania	AL02	Tirana County	AL022
Albania	AL0	Southern Albania	AL03		
Albania	AL0	Southern Albania	AL03	Berat County	AL031
Albania	AL0	Southern Albania	AL03	Fier County	AL032
Albania	AL0	Southern Albania	AL03	Gjirokastër County	AL033
Albania	AL0	Southern Albania	AL03	Korçë County	AL034
Albania	AL0	Southern Albania	AL03	Vlorë County	AL035
