= Central Albania =

NUTS-2 region of Albania

Central Albania Shqipëria Qendrore
- Region
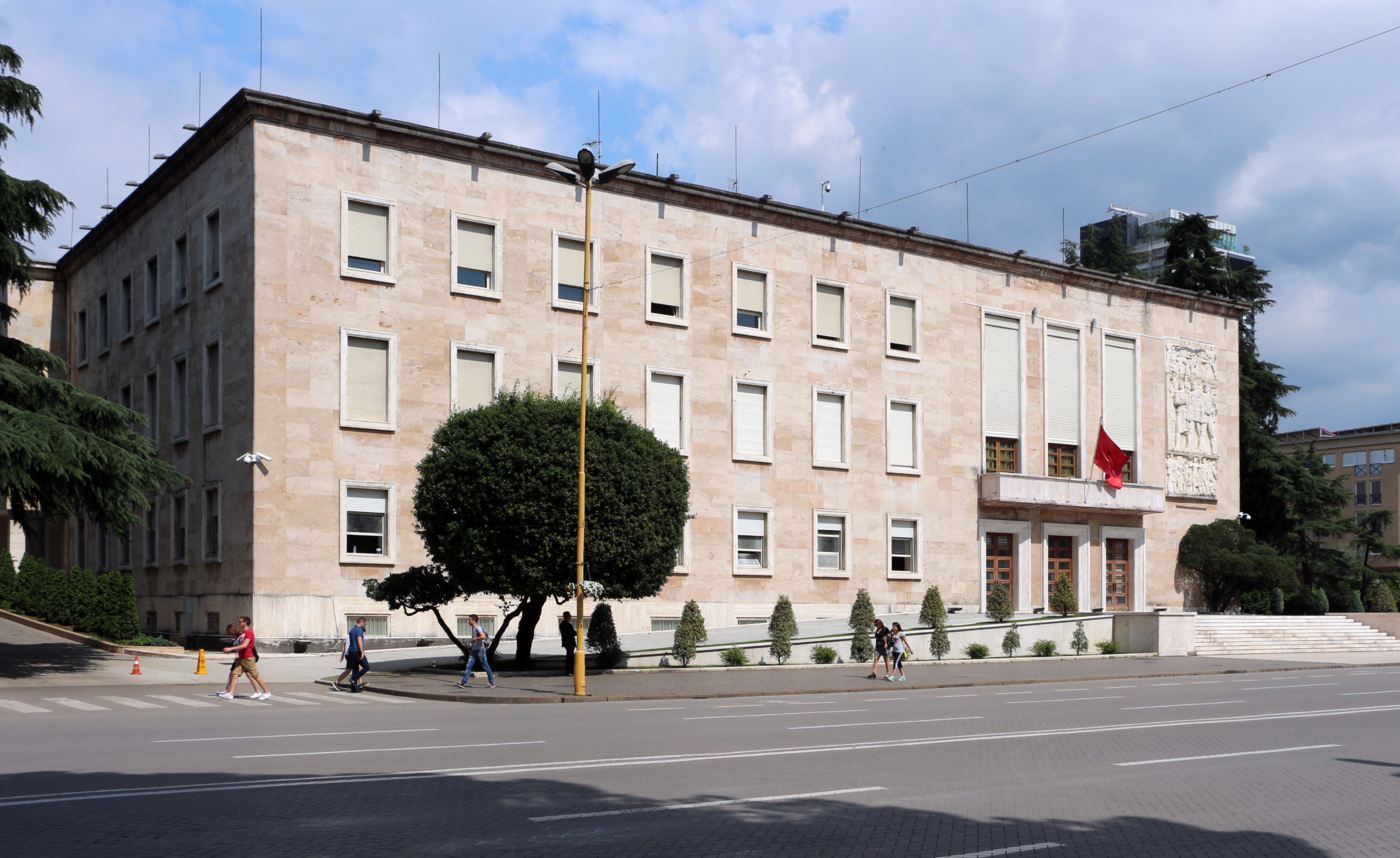
- Tirana, the capital and seat of the Government of Albania
- Interactive map of Central Albania
- Country: Albania

Area
  - Total: 4,967 km^{2} (1,918 sq mi)

Population (2023)
  - Total: 991,093
  - Density: 199.5/km^{2} (516.8/sq mi)

GDP
  - Total: €7.647 billion (2023)
- NUTS code: AL02
- HDI (2022): 0.818 high

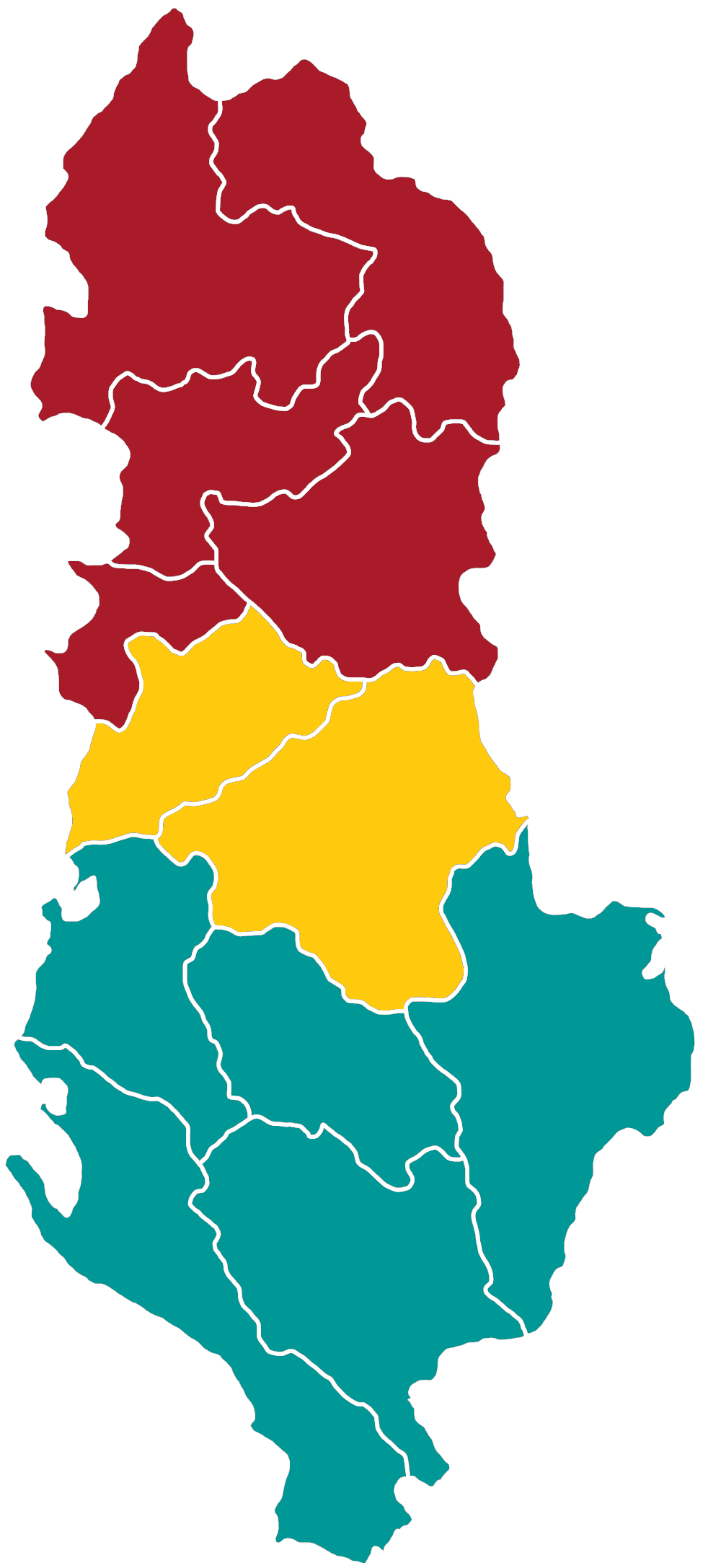
Central Albania (yellow) in Albania

Central Albania (Albanian: Shqipëria Qendrore) is a subdivision of Albania as defined by the Nomenclature of Territorial Units for Statistics (NUTS). It is one of the three classified NUTS-2 statistical regions of Albania. The region incorporates the central parts of the country including the capital Tirana, and encompasses an area of 4,967 km^{2} (1,918 sq mi). It incorporates the counties of Tirana, and Elbasan. With a population of nearly one million, it is the most populated of the all the regions in Albania.

== Classification ==
The country of Albania is organized into 12 counties for administrative purposes. The Nomenclature of Territorial Units for Statistics (NUTS) organizes the country into three broader level sub-divisions. These are classified as a NUTS-2 statistical regions of Albania, and incorporate one or more counties within it. The regions form the NUTS-3 territorial units under them.

== Geography ==
Central Albania incorporates the central parts of the country around the capital city of Tirana, encompassing an area of 4,967 km^{2} (1,918 sq mi). The region is located in Southeastern Europe, bordering the Aegean Sea. It shares an international land border with Struga Municipality of North Macedonia. It is bordered by the counties of Dibër and Durres of North Albania to the north, and Berat, Fier and Korce of South Albania to the south.

The western part of the region consists of a narrow coast which reaches a maximum width of 50 km (31 mi) in the Elbasan county. It is made up of marshlands, and eroded low lying scrublands often with no vegetation. Moving towards the west, the elevation increases gradually, and consists of arable lands suitable for agriculture. These lands extend towards the foothills of the central uplands called Çermenikë, which consist of small hills with average elevation ranging between 305–915 m (1,001–3,002 ft). The western part of the region lies on a faultline, and is in a seismically active zone.

The Albanian rivers that pass through the region flow from east to west due to the topography of the land. Due to its closeness to the sea, the western lowlands experience warm and humid summers, and milder winters. The precipitation increases while moving eastwards, with the central highlands experiencing the greatest rainfall.

=== Sub-regions ===
Central Albania consists of two counties: Tirana County and Elbasan County.

== List ==
County	Seat	Municipalities	Area	Population (2023)	Emblem	Geographic coordinates
Elbasan	Elbasan	Belsh, Cërrik, Elbasan, Gramsh, Librazhd, Peqin, Prrenjas	3,314 km^{2} (1,280 sq mi)	232,580	Emblem of Elbasan County	41°6′N 20°8′E
Tirana	Tiranë	Kamëz, Kavajë, Rrogozhinë, Tirana, Vorë	1,653 km^{2} (638 sq mi)	758,513	Emblem of Tirana County	41°6′N 20°8′E

== Demographics ==
Historical population

Year	Pop.	±%
1989	806,725	—
2001	960,635	+19.1%

Year	Pop.	±%
2011	1,045,192	+8.8%
2023	991,093	−5.2%

With a population of nearly one million, it is the most populated of the all the regions in Albania. The population consists of 448,003 males and 543,090 females. With a GRDP of €7.647 billion, the region contributes to more than 50% of the country's GDP.

== See also ==
- Northern Albania (Ghegeria)
- Southern Albania (Toskeria)
