= Counties of Albania =

First-level administrative divisions of Albania

- Category: Unitary state
- Location: Republic of Albania
- Number: 12
- Populations: 59,381 (Gjirokastër) – 906,166 (Tiranë)
- Areas: 766 km^{2} (296 sq mi) (Durrës)–3,711 km^{2} (1,433 sq mi) (Korçë)
- Government: County government National government
- Subdivisions: Municipalities

Counties (Albanian: qarqe or qarqet), also sometimes known as prefectures (prefektura or prefekturat), are the first-level administrative subdivisions of Albania, replacing the earlier districts. Since 2000, there have been 12 counties. Since 2015, they have been divided into 61 municipalities, 373 communes, and 2,972 villages.

== History ==
Since its Declaration of Independence from the Ottoman Empire in 1912, Albania has reorganized its domestic administrative divisions 21 times. The primary division until mid-2000 was into districts (rrathë or rrathët), whose number, size, and importance varied over time. They were organized into groups comprising 12 counties beginning in 1991.

The current status of the counties is based on the 1998 constitution and was implemented on 31 July 2000. The former districts were abolished entirely and replaced with urban municipalities (bashki or bashkitë) and rural municipalities (komuna or komunat), which further oversaw villages (fshatra or fshatrat) in the countryside. This was revised in 2014, so that the 2015 local elections divided the counties into municipalities (bashki or bashkitë) at the regional level and administrative units (njësi administrative or njësitë administrative) for local government.

== List ==

County	Seat	Municipalities	NUTS-2	Area	Population (2023)	Population density (per km^{2} in 2023)	Emblem	Geographic coordinates
Berat	Berat	Berat, Kuçovë, Poliçan, Skrapar, Ura Vajgurore	Southern Region	1,798 km^{2} (694 sq mi)	140,956	78.4	Emblem of Berat County	40°44′N 19°59′E
Dibër	Peshkopi	Bulqizë, Dibër, Klos, Mat	Northern Region	2,586 km^{2} (998 sq mi)	107,178	41.4	Emblem of Dibër County	41°42′N 20°22′E
Durrës	Durrës	Durrës, Krujë, Shijak	Northern Region	766 km^{2} (296 sq mi)	226,863	296.2	Emblem of Durrës County	41°23′N 19°30′E
Elbasan	Elbasan	Belsh, Cërrik, Elbasan, Gramsh, Librazhd, Peqin, Prrenjas	Central Region	3,199 km^{2} (1,235 sq mi)	232,580	72.7	Emblem of Elbasan County	41°6′N 20°8′E
Fier	Fier	Divjakë, Fier, Lushnjë, Mallakastër, Patos, Roskovec	Southern Region	1,890 km^{2} (730 sq mi)	240,377	127.2	Emblem of Fier County	44°46′N 19°37′E
Gjirokastër	Gjirokastër	Dropull, Gjirokastër, Këlcyrë, Libohovë, Memaliaj, Përmet, Tepelenë	Southern Region	2,884 km^{2} (1,114 sq mi)	60,013	20.8	Emblem of Gjirokastër County	40°12′N 20°15′E
Korçë	Korçë	Devoll, Kolonjë, Korçë, Maliq, Pogradec, Pustec	Southern Region	3,711 km^{2} (1,433 sq mi)	173,091	46.6	Emblem of Korçë County	40°40′N 20°48′E
Kukës	Kukës	Has, Kukës, Tropojë	Northern Region	2,374 km^{2} (917 sq mi)	61,998	26.1	Emblem of Kukës County	42°7′N 20°25′E
Lezhë	Lezhë	Kurbin, Lezhë, Mirditë	Northern Region	1,620 km^{2} (630 sq mi)	99,384	61.3	Emblem of Lezhë County	41°49′N 19°41′E
Shkodër	Shkodër	Fushë-Arrëz, Malësi e Madhe, Pukë, Shkodër, Vau i Dejës	Northern Region	3,562 km^{2} (1,375 sq mi)	154,479	43.4	Emblem of Shkodër County	42°6′N 19°37′E
Tirana	Tiranë	Kamëz, Kavajë, Rrogozhinë, Tirana, Vorë	Central Region	1,652 km^{2} (638 sq mi)	758,513	459.1	Emblem of Tirana County	41°6′N 20°8′E
Vlorë	Vlorë	Delvinë, Finiq, Himarë, Konispol, Sarandë, Selenicë, Vlorë	Southern Region	2,706 km^{2} (1,045 sq mi)	146,681	54.2	Emblem of Vlorë County	40°30′N 19°37′E

== See also ==
- List of counties of Albania by area
- List of counties of Albania by Gross Domestic Product
- List of counties of Albania by Human Development Index
- List of counties of Albania by population
- List of counties of Albania by population density
