= Villages of Albania =

Fourth-level administrative divisions of Albania

Albania's 373 units of local administration, which now oversee village administration.

Albania has 2,972 villages (Albanian: fshatra or fshatrat) as of 2016. Albania has reformed its domestic administrative divisions 21 times since its Declaration of Independence from the Ottoman Empire in 1912. Following the most recent reorganization, enacted in 2014 and carried out in June 2015, Albania's 12 counties were entirely divided into 61 municipalities for regional government and 373 administrative units for local government. These administrative units, communes, and towns now oversee most government at the village level.

The Albanian Institute of Statistics stopped providing comprehensive population data for villages after the 1989 census, and as of now the administrative units comprise the lowest official level of division in Albania.

== List of villages by county ==
- Villages of Berat County
- Villages of Dibër County
- Villages of Durrës County
- Villages of Elbasan County
- Villages of Fier County
- Villages of Gjirokastër County
- Villages of Korçë County
- Villages of Kukës County
- Villages of Lezhë County
- Villages of Shkodër County
- Villages of Tirana County
- Villages of Vlorë County

== See also ==
- Administrative divisions of Albania
