= Villages of Shkodër County =

The Shkodër County in northwestern Albania is subdivided into 5 municipalities. These municipalities contain 283 towns and villages:
