= List of counties of Albania by population =

Albanian counties by population and population density

Below are the lists of the counties of Albania by population and population density in alphabetical order.

== Counties by population ==
Counties of Albania by population
County	2002	2004	2006	2008	2010	2012	2014	2016	2018	2020	2021	2022	2023
Berat	188,982	181,155	172,383	162,519	153,077	146,736	141,114	135,441	127,431	122,003	119,450	115,050	111,431
Dibër	184,167	176,827	168,150	157,999	148,074	140,956	134,332	129,056	120,978	115,857	113,683	109,585	106,380
Durrës	248,358	252,380	256,839	260,386	265,639	271,947	276,058	280,205	289,628	290,697	292,029	291,325	289,797
Elbasan	357,044	345,762	333,636	321,098	309,657	302,863	294,938	287,606	278,547	270,074	266,245	259,112	252,719
Fier	377,857	368,056	355,766	342,638	330,378	320,789	312,248	305,108	298,144	289,889	286,002	278,413	271,672
Gjirokastër	109,519	103,399	96,634	89,343	82,238	76,054	71,567	68,020	62,952	59,381	58,031	55,278	53,314
Korçë	261,549	255,264	248,587	240,875	233,820	228,118	223,029	217,422	210,178	204,831	202,193	197,303	192,925
Kukës	108,011	104,866	101,084	96,304	91,226	87,762	84,306	81,294	77,394	75,428	74,388	72,768	71,498
Lezhë	158,055	154,193	150,094	145,240	140,755	137,782	133,748	130,258	126,800	122,700	120,678	117,283	114,181
Shkodër	252,699	247,916	243,246	235,667	229,140	222,611	216,477	210,168	204,994	200,007	197,177	193,009	189,164
Tirana	617,550	650,767	683,927	715,328	747,169	780,905	816,222	842,981	883,996	906,166	912,190	919,511	925,268
Vlorë	193,227	193,646	192,983	190,869	187,501	186,485	188,355	188,033	189,282	188,922	187,675	184,955	183,436
Source: Instituti i Statistikës (INSTAT)

== Counties by population density ==
County	Population density		Population		Area	
County	Rank	Density (inh./km^{2})	Rank	Estimate (2011 census)	Rank	Area (km^{2})
Berat	6	79	8	141,944	9	1,798
Dibër	10	53	9	137,047	6	2,586
Durrës	2	343	4	262,785	12	766
Elbasan	4	92	3	295,827	3	3,199
Fier	3	164	2	310,331	8	1,890
Gjirokastër	12	25	12	72,176	4	2,884
Korçë	9	59	5	220,357	1	3,711
Kukës	11	36	11	85,292	7	2,374
Lezhë	5	83	10	134,027	11	1,620
Shkodër	8	60	6	215,347	2	3,562
Tirana	1	454	1	749,365	10	1,652
Vlorë	7	65	7	175,640	5	2,706
Source: Instituti i Statistikës (INSTAT)
