= Villages of Durrës County =

The Durrës County in western Albania is subdivided into 3 municipalities. These municipalities contain 111 towns and villages:
