= Ghegs =

Ethnic subgroup of Albanians

The Ghegs (also spelled Gegs; Albanian: Gegët) are one of the two main dialectal subgroups of Albanians, alongside the Tosks. These groups are distinguished by their linguistic characteristics.

The Ghegs live in Albania (north of the Shkumbin river), Kosovo, North Macedonia, Serbia and Montenegro. The Ghegs speak Gheg Albanian, one of the two main dialects of Albanian language. The social organization of the Ghegs was traditionally tribal, with several distinct tribal groups of Ghegs.

The Ottoman Empire annexed and ruled the Tosk-inhabited south at the beginning of the 15th century, while the territory populated by Ghegs remained out of the reach of the regular Ottoman civil administration until the beginning of the 20th century. As a consequence, the Ghegs evolved isolated from the Tosks. Similarly, the Islamization of the Ghegs was incomplete, with a large area of northwestern Albania remaining Catholic. The Ottomans never completely subdued the northern Albanian tribes of Ghegs because they were more useful to them as a stable source of mercenaries. Instead, they implemented the bayraktar system, and granted some privileges to the bayraktars (banner chiefs) in exchange for their obligation to mobilize local fighters to support military actions of the Ottoman forces.

== Terminology ==
Proper Gegnia (the land of the Gegë) is located in the area between the river up to the border between Mati District and Mirdita District, where Leknia begins. Leknia itself is bordered to the north by Malësia. None of these regions overlap with one another and each has its own self-identification. This is reflected in the fact that only the people of proper Gegnia call themselves Gegë, while moving northwards it is not a form of regional self-identification. For example, the people of the Dukagjin highlands when asked about their regional appellation would reply na nuk jemi gegë, gegët janë përtej maleve (we are not Gheghs, the Ghegs live beyond the mountains).

The popular perception in non-Albanian literature of all northern Albanians as Ghegs is a product of identifying major dialect groups with all corresponding regional groupings. Likewise, only the people of certain regions in southern Albania identify as Tosks.

== Etymology ==
The etymology of the term Gheg is not completely clear. According to the writer Arshi Pipa, the term Gegë was initially used for confessional denotation, being used in pre-Ottoman Albania by its Orthodox population when referring to their Catholic neighbors.

== Territory ==
Ethnographic regions of the Ghegs

In Albania, Ghegs predominantly live north of the Shkumbin river and in areas of the mountainous north. (from the non-Albanian perspective) This region is widely referred to by Albanians as Gegënia or Gegnia and as Gegëria.

The Ottoman Turkish term, used during the times when Albania and the wider area was included in the empire, was Gegalık, meaning land of the Ghegs. During the late Ottoman period apart from the term Arnavudluk (Albania) being used for Albanian regions, the designation Gegalık was also used in documents by Ottomans. Gegëni or Gegalık encompassed the İșkodra, Kosovo, and a small area of the Monastir vilayets. In the 1880s, Albanians defined the wider region of Gegalık (Ghegland) as encompassing the Ottoman administrative units of İșkodra (Shkodër) and Duraç (Durrës) sanjaks that composed İșkodra vilayet (province), the sanjaks of Yenipazar (Novi Pazar), İpek (Pejë), Priștine (Prishtinë), Prizren, Üsküp (Skopje) of Kosovo vilayet and the sanjak of Dibra (Debar) in Monastir vilayet.

Little more than half of ethnic Albanians from Albania are Ghegs. Except for a Tosk population in north-western Greece and around lake Prespa as well as southern North Macedonia, the ethnic Albanians in the Balkans who live in Kosovo, North Macedonia (mostly) and Montenegro are Ghegs.

== Language ==
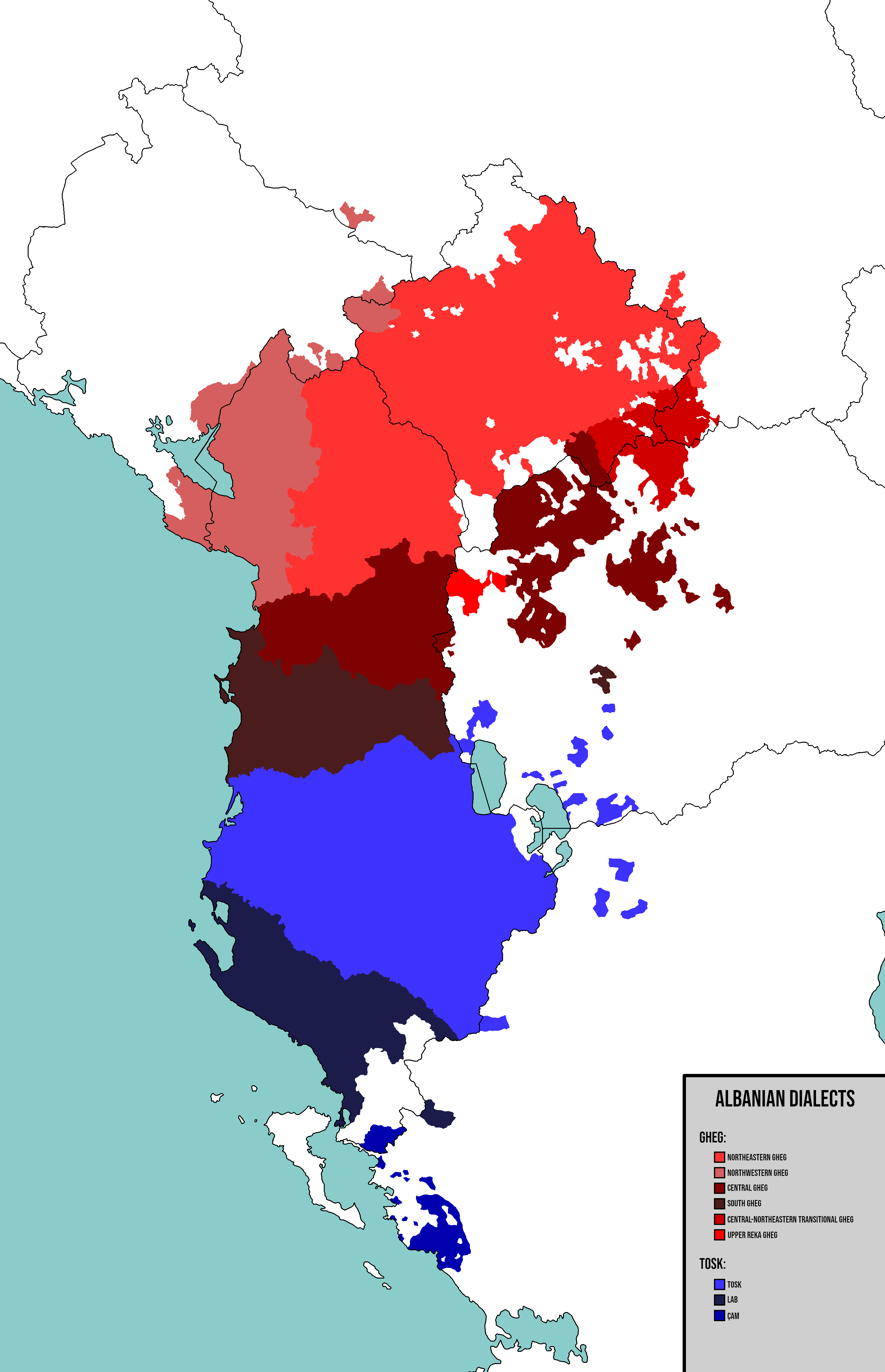
Gheg dialect and sub-dialects shown in red. Tosk dialects shown in blue.

The Ghegs speak Gheg Albanian, one of the two main Albanian dialects. The Albanian communist regime based the standard Albanian language mostly on Tosk Albanian. This practice has been criticized, notably by Arshi Pipa, who claimed that this decision deprived the Albanian language of its richness at the expense of the Ghegs, and referred to the literary Albanian language as a "monstrosity" produced by the Tosk communist leadership which conquered anti-Communist north Albania militarily, and imposed their Tosk Albanian dialect on the Ghegs. Although Albanian writers in former Yugoslavia were almost all Ghegs, they chose to write in Tosk for political reasons. This change of literary language has significant political and cultural consequences because the language is the main criterion for Albanian self-identification.

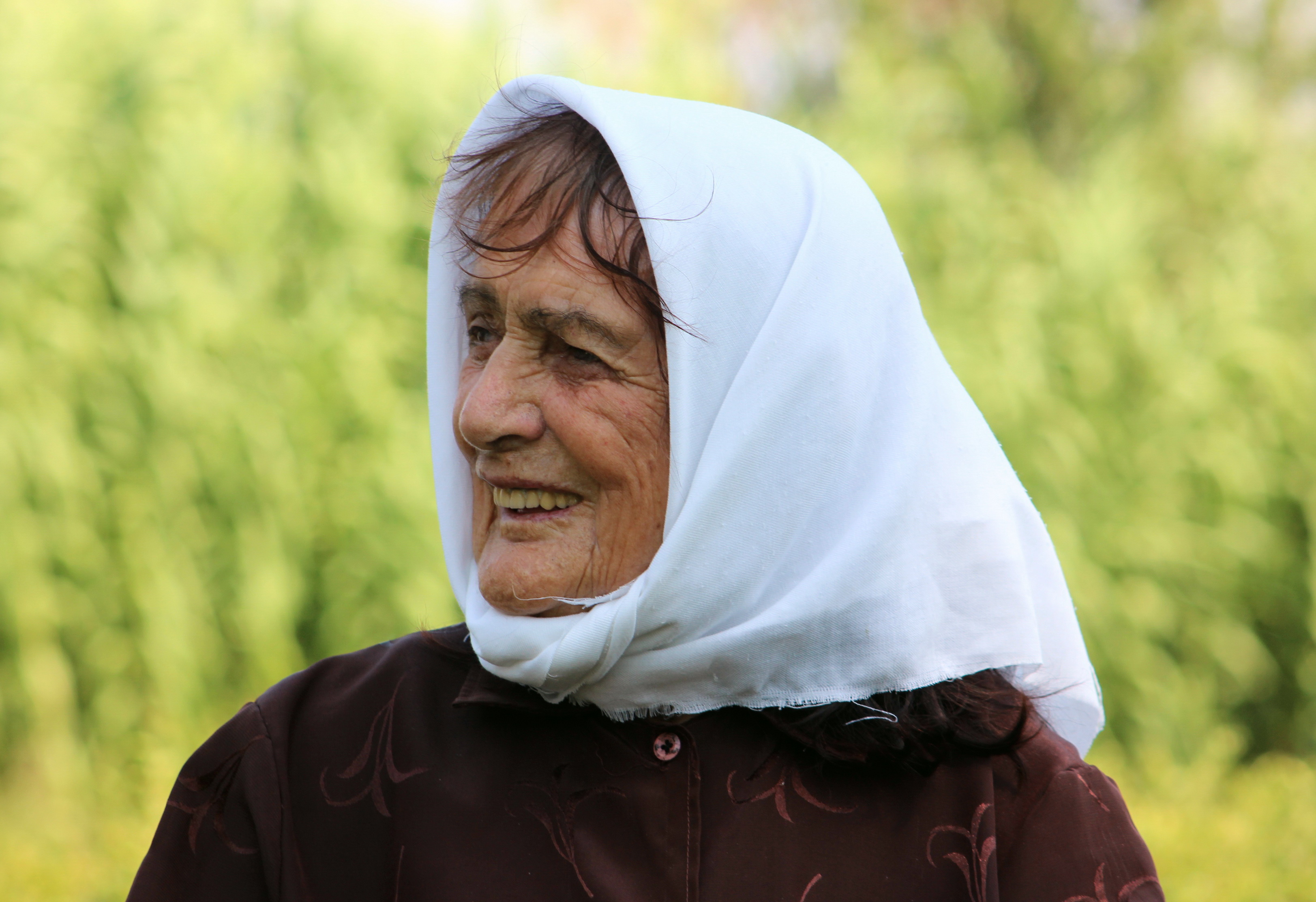
Gheg woman from North Albania

== Social organization ==
The social organization of the Ghegs was traditionally tribal. The Ghegs of Northern Albania are one of only two tribal societies which survived in Europe until the middle of the 20th century (the other being the Montenegrin highlanders in Montenegro and southern Serbia). The tribal organization was based on the clan system of loyalties, and the dispersed settlement pattern of separate, scattered, mostly fortified homesteads. There are several distinct tribal groups of Ghegs which include Mirëdita, Kelmendi, Palabardhi, Kuqi, Vasajt, Hoti, Kastrati, Berisha, Krasniqi and Shala. Other important tribal groupings include the highlanders of the Dibra region known as the "Tigers of Dibra". Western Kosovo during the late Ottoman period was dominated by the Albanian tribal system, while parts of Albanian society within wider Kosovo were also part of the urban-professional and landowning classes of major towns.

The Ghegs, particularly those who lived in the north-eastern area, were the most faithful supporters of the set of traditional laws (Kanun), traditional hospitality, and blood feud. Among Gheg Malësors (highlanders) the fis (clan) was headed by the oldest male and formed the basic unit of tribal society. A political and territorial equivalent consisting of several clans was the bajrak (standard). The leader of a bajrak, whose position was hereditary, was referred to as bajraktar (standard bearer). Several bajraks composed a tribe, which was led by a man from a notable family, while major issues were decided by the tribe assembly whose members were male members of the tribe.

The organization of once predominantly herder Gheg tribes was traditionally based on patrilineality (a system in which an individual belongs to his or her father's lineage), and on exogamy (a social arrangement where marriage is allowed only outside of a social group). The land belongs to the clan, and families are traditionally extended, consisting of smaller families of many brothers who all live in one extended ménage (Albanian: shtëpi. Gheg Albanian: shpi). Girls were married without their consent, while bride stealing still existed to some extent until the early 20th century. Marriage was basically an economic and political deal arranged among the members of the tribe, while those who got married had no say in the matter. Sworn virginity was occasionally practised among the Ghegs. Child betrothal was also practised by the Ghegs, sometimes even before birth.

== Religion ==
Christianity in Albania was under the jurisdiction of the Bishop of Rome until the eighth century. Then, dioceses in Albania were transferred to the patriarchate of Constantinople. In 1054 after the schism, the north became identified with the Roman Catholic Church. Since that time all churches north of the Shkumbin river were Catholic and under the jurisdiction of the Pope. Various reasons have been put forward for the spread of Catholicism among northern Albanians. Traditional affiliation with the Latin rite and Catholic missions in central Albania in the 12th century fortified the Catholic Church against Orthodoxy, while local leaders found an ally in Catholicism against Slavic Orthodox states.

During the Ottoman period in the history of Albania (1385–1912), the majority of Albanians converted to Islam. Today, the majority of Ghegs are Sunni Muslims, with a large minority being Catholic. Catholic Albanians are most heavily concentrated in northwestern Albania and the Malësia region of southeastern Montenegro, in both of which they form of a majority of population, while they have a thinner distribution in central Albania and northeastern Albania and Kosovo. There are also Ghegs who practice Orthodox Christianity, mainly living in the southwest of the Gheg-speaking region, especially Durrës (where they formed 36% of the population in 1918) and Elbasan (where they formed 17% of the population in 1918). Orthodox Ghegs were traditionally also heavily concentrated in the region of Upper Reka (Reka e Epërme) in North Macedonia. There are also some groups of Ghegs who practice Bektashism, living in areas such as Kruja and Bulqiza. Additionally, as is the case with all Albanians as a legacy of the Enver Hoxha regime, many people don't identify with any faith, and a large number of people do not usually attend the services of any religion.

== Culture ==
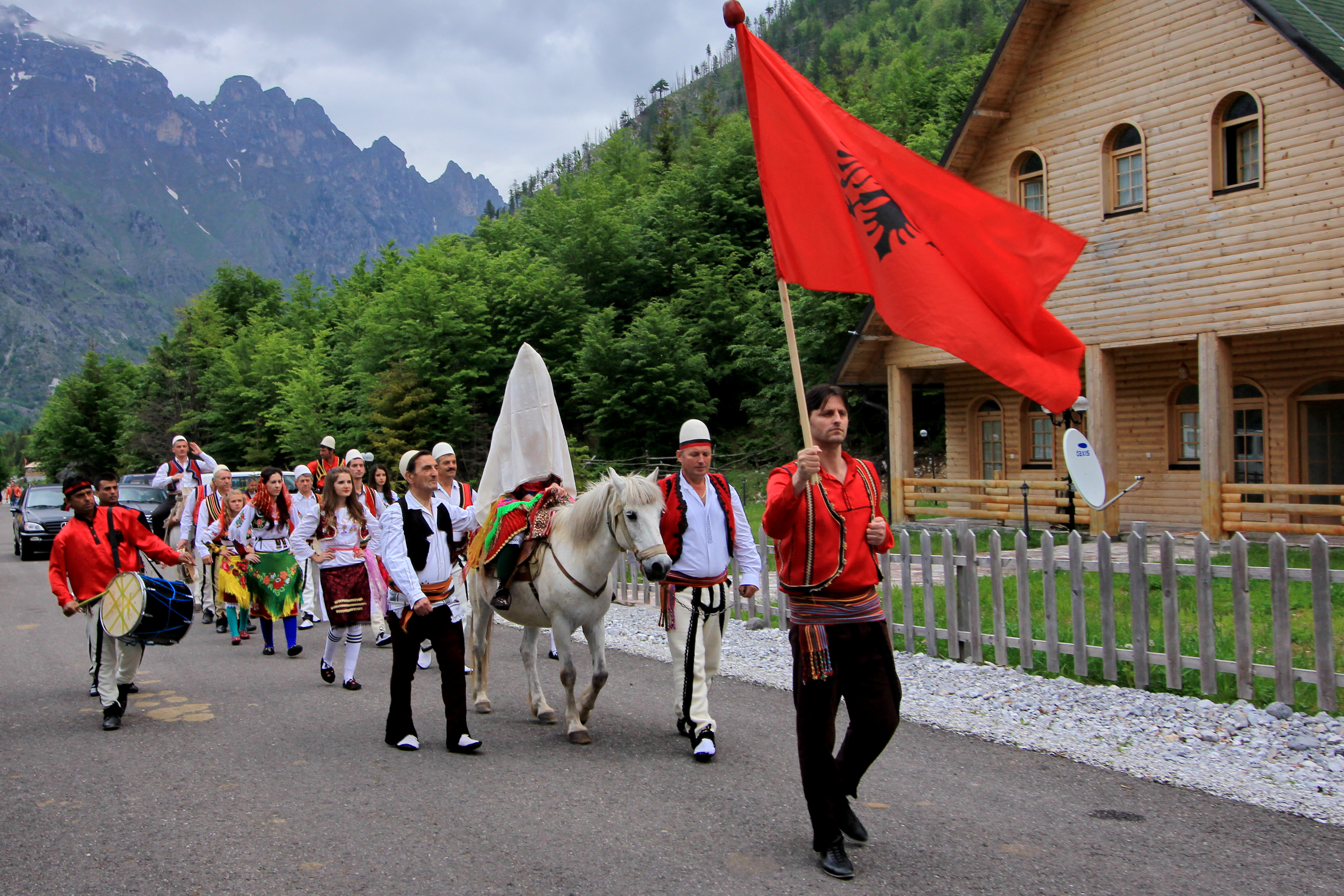
Albanian wedding ceremony in Valbona, northern Albania

After the Tanzimat reforms in the second half of the 19th century, aiming to gain influence over Catholic Albanians, Austria-Hungary, with Ottoman approval, opened and financed many schools in the Albanian language, and Franciscan seminaries and hospitals, and trained native clergy, which all resulted in the development of literature in the Albanian language. The culture of the Ghegs blossomed at the beginning of 20th century. Gjergj Fishta and the Scutarine Catholic School of Letters led by Fishta significantly contributed to this blossoming. The Ghegs are known for their epic poetry.

The revival of Catholicism among Albanians gave a new and important impulse to the rise of Gheg culture.

== Physical anthropology ==
Gheg Albanian men are immense tall, these individuals normally stand 183 cm (6 ft 0 in) on average, as seen in most regions in Kosovo, characterized by long limbs, a strong skeletal framework, and well-developed musculature, resulting in a generally spare and lean build. The face is thin and bony, of moderate dimensions, yet set within a distinctly hyperbrachycephalic cranial structure, producing a short and broad head that is often flattened posteriorly. Facial features include a long, narrow, aquiline nose. Facial hair is typically well developed, with mustache and beard present and varying in color. Skin tone is light, eye color is mixed, and body hair is only moderately developed.

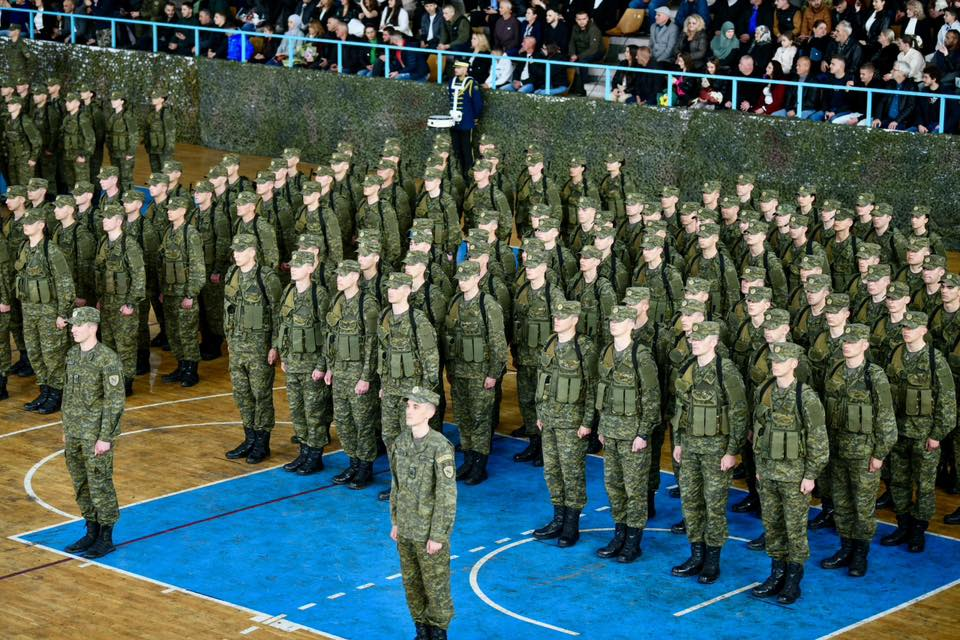
Kosovo Army by 2025.

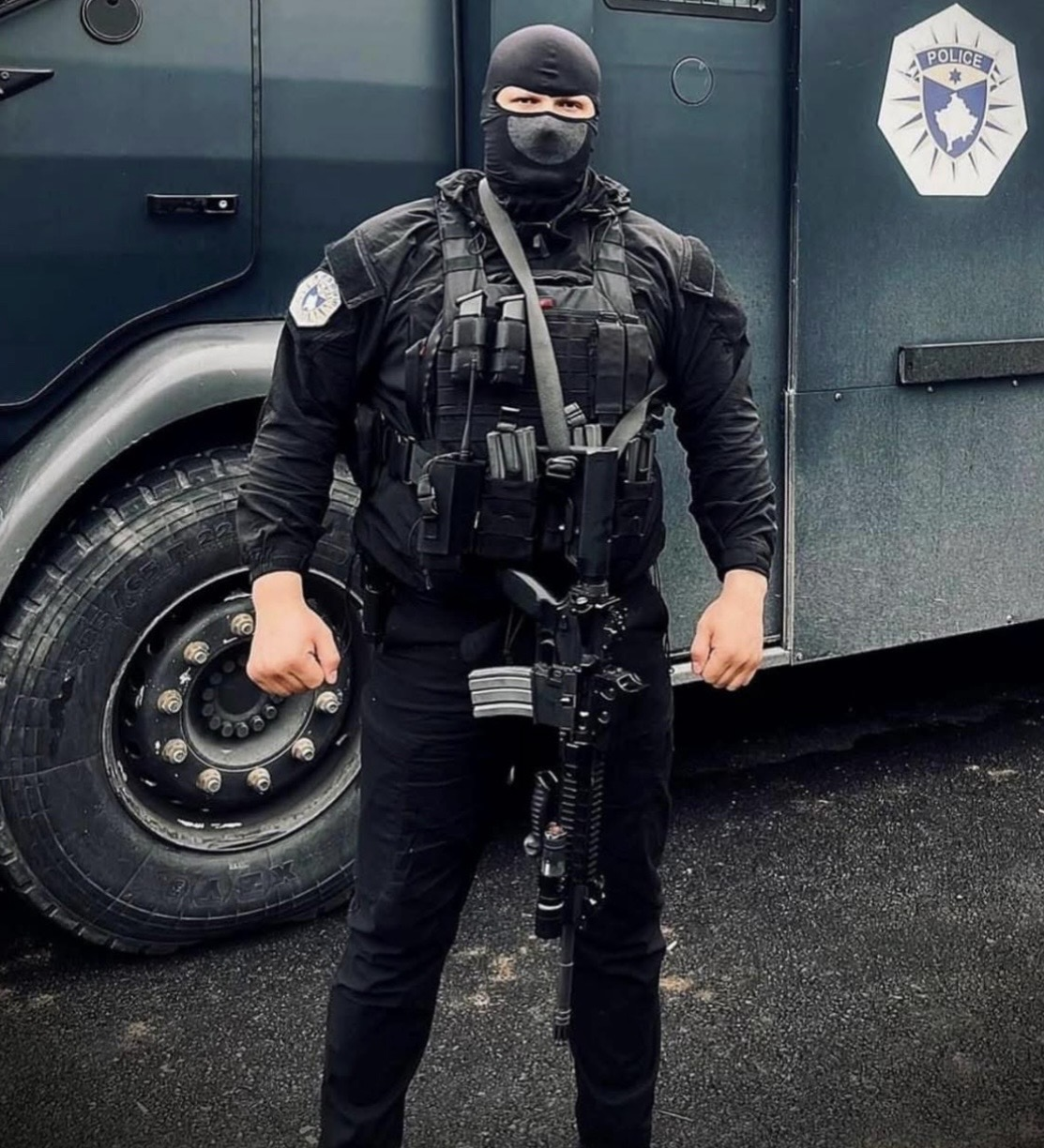
Gheg Albanian Policeman

According to Pettifer & Vickers in 2007, "Ghegs speak a slightly different dialect of the language, and are often taller and thinner than Tosks, but these traditional differences (often exaggerated in vulgar anthropology) have been much diminished by population movement in the post-communist period."

== History ==
=== Pre-Ottoman and Ottoman period ===
There was a distinction between Ghegs and Tosks before the Ottomans appeared in Albania at the end of the 14th century.

The Ghegs remained out of the reach of the regular Ottoman civil administration until the end of Ottoman rule. In areas where Ghegs were still tribesmen they followed their own laws and lived an autonomous existence. The fact that the tribes of northern Albania were not completely subdued by the Ottomans is raised to the level of orthodoxy among the members of the tribes. A possible explanation is that the Ottomans did not have any real interest in subduing the northern Albanian tribes because they were more useful to them as a stable source of mercenaries. The Ottomans implemented the bayraktar system within northern Albanian tribes, and granted some privileges to the bayraktars (banner chiefs) in exchange for their obligation to mobilize local fighters to support military actions of the Ottoman forces. During the late Ottoman period Ghegs often lacked education and integration within the Ottoman system, while they had autonomy and military capabilities. Those factors gave the area of Gegënia an importance within the empire that differed from Toskëria. Still many Ottoman officers thought that Ghegs, in particular the highlanders were often a liability instead of an asset for the state being commonly referred to as "wild" (Turkish: vahşi). In areas of Albania where Malësors (highlanders) lived, the empire only posted Ottoman officers who had prior experience of service in other tribal regions of the state like Kurdistan or Yemen that could bridge cultural divides with Gheg tribesmen.

The Great Eastern Crisis resulted in Albanian resistance to partition by neighbouring powers with the formation of the Prizren League (1878) which issued a Kararname (memorandum) that declared both Ghegs and Tosks had made an oath to defend the state and homeland in the name of Islam. During the crisis Ghegs and Tosks made besas (pledges of honor) to arm themselves and shed blood to defend their rights. Better armed than its southern Tosk counterpart, Gheg society was in a more effective position to resist the redrawing of borders in the region. Ottoman officials initially assisted Gheg Albanians in their efforts to resist incorporation of their lands into Serbia, Montenegro or Bulgaria. Ghegs experienced a brief moment of an autonomous administration where local tax was collected into Albanian coffers. Calls for an autonomous united Albania made sultan Abdul Hamid II suppress the League of Prizren movement, especially after Gheg Albanians revolted in 1881 and posed a military challenge to Ottoman authority.

Large parts of Gegënia posed a security problem for the Ottoman Empire, due to the tribalism of Gheg society and limited state control. Gheg freedoms were tolerated by Abdul Hamid II and he enlisted them in his palace guard, integrated the sons of local notables from urban areas into the bureaucracy and co-opted leaders like Isa Boletini into the Ottoman system. During the Young Turk Revolution (1908) some Ghegs were one group in Albanian society that gave its support for the restoration of the Ottoman constitution of 1876 to end the Hamidian regime. Subsequent centralising policies and militarism toward the Albanian Question by the new Young Turk government resulted in four years of local revolts by Ghegs who fought to keep tribal privileges and the defense system of kulas (tower houses). Ghegs from the Shkodër region supported the Greçë Memorandum that called for Albanian sociopolitical rights within the Ottoman Empire during the Albanian revolt of 1911. On the eve of the Balkan Wars (1912-1913) Gheg and Tosk Albanians managed to secure two concessions from the Ottoman government: the rights of Albanian ethnicity and rights for the highlander population during the Albanian revolt of 1912.

=== Albania ===
The Ghegs were dominant in the political life of Albania in the pre-communist period.

=== Recruitment of Ghegs during World War II ===
During World War II, Heinrich Himmler personally oversaw the recruitment of Albanian Muslims into the Waffen-SS, leading to the creation of the 21st Waffen Mountain Division of the SS Skanderbeg. For this division, Himmler specifically targeted Ghegs, mainly from Kosovo, but also from northern Albania, influenced by claims made during the Italian occupation. Italian anthropologists had asserted that the Ghegs were part of the Aryan or Nordic race, similar to the Germans. This idea resonated with Himmler’s racial ideology and provided justification for their recruitment.

Himmler admired the Ghegs for what he perceived as their toughness, loyalty, and military potential, and saw them as a modern reflection of the elite Bosnian regiments of World War I. In contrast, the southern Albanians, the Tosks, were not included in this classification and were deemed less racially suitable. Furthermore, Himmler strongly supported the concept of a “Greater Albania” as it aligned with Nazi geopolitical goals in the Balkans and helped to foster loyalty among Albanian recruits.

At the end of World War II, communist forces predominantly composed of Tosks captured Albania after the retreat of the Wehrmacht. That was perceived by many Ghegs as the Tosk takeover of Gheg lands. Most members of the post-war communist regime and three quarters of the Communist Party of Albania members were Tosks. Therefore, the communist takeover was accompanied by the transfer of political power from the Ghegs to the Tosks. The Ghegs were consistently persecuted by the predominantly Tosk regime, which saw them as traditionalist and less developed. After Enver Hoxha died in 1985, he was succeeded by Ramiz Alia, who was one of the few Ghegs among the leaders of the country. He took cautious steps towards changing direction on the national identity issue by gradually assuming the cause of the Ghegs from Kosovo. This change was accompanied by a long-lasting fear that the introduction of "too-liberal" Albanians from Kosovo might disturb the fragile balance between the Tosk and Gheg sub-ethnic groups. Absorbing Yugoslav Ghegs, who were almost as numerous as all Albanians from Albania, could have ruined the predominantly Tosk regime.

After the fall of the communist regime, religion was again the major factor which determined social identity, and rivalry between Ghegs and Tosks re-emerged. The new political leaders of post-communist Albania appointed by Gheg Sali Berisha were almost all Ghegs from northern Albania. The administration of Sali Berisha was identified as northern nationalist Gheg in opposition to southern Socialist Tosk, which additionally increased the contention between Tosks and Ghegs. In 1998 Berisha exploited the traditional Gheg—Tosk rivalry when he encouraged armed anti-Government protesters in Shkodër in actions that forced the resignation of prime minister Fatos Nano.

During the Kosovo War, rivalry between Ghegs and Tosks faded, and a huge number of refugees from Kosovo were catered for with no internal conflict, despite unavoidable grumbles about the disruption of the community and theft.

== See also ==
- Albanian tribes
