= Shkodër County =

Country in northern Albania

Shkodër County Qarku i Shkodrës (Albanian)
- County
- Flag Emblem

- Map of Albania with Shkodër County highlighted
- Coordinates: 42°6′N 19°37′E
- Country: Albania
- Seat: Shkodër
- Subdivisions: 5 municipalities: Fushë-Arrëz; Malësi e Madhe; Pukë; Shkodër; Vau i Dejës

Government
  - Council chairman: Edmond Ndou (PSD)

Area
  - Total: 3,562 km^{2} (1,375 sq mi)
  - Rank: 2nd

Population (2023)
  - Total: 154,478
  - Rank: 6th
  - Density: 43.37/km^{2} (112.3/sq mi)
- Time zone: UTC+1 (CET)
  - Summer (DST): UTC+2 (CEST)
- HDI (2023): 0.821 very high · 6th
- NUTS Code: AL015
- Website: www.qarkushkoder.gov.al

Shkodër County (Albanian: Qarku i Shkodrës) is a county in northwestern Albania, with the capital in Shkodër. The county spans 3,562 square kilometres (1,375 sq mi) and had a total population of 154,479 people as of the 2023 census. The county borders on the counties of Lezhë, Kukës and the country of Montenegro. The county consists of five municipalities: Fushë-Arrëz, Malësi e Madhe, Pukë, Shkodër and Vau i Dejës.

During the Bronze Age, the area was inhabited by various Illyrian tribes such as the Ardiaeis and Labeataes. Illyria was annexed by Rome in the second century BC, becoming an integral part of the Roman Empire and its successor the Byzantine Empire. Falling under Venetian and Ottoman dominion in the late Middle Ages, the modern nation state of Albania emerged in 1912 following its independence.

The climate of the county is profoundly affected by the Adriatic Sea in the west and the Albanian Alps in the north. It experiences mostly mediterranean climate, while the north enjoys continental climate. The summers are predominantly hot and dry, the winters relatively mild, and autumns and springs mainly unstable, both in terms of precipitation and temperatures. Heavy rainfall is extremely common in the county and has caused many floodings of the rivers and lakes.

The county features notable diversity with the landscape ranging from the snow-capped Albanian Alps in the north to the warm regions of Shkodra Lake and Adriatic Sea in the south and southwest. Being a geological continuation of the Dinaric Alps, the Albanian Alps are the highest section and one of the most rugged mountains in Europe. While the Alps occupy the northern part of the territory, the population is concentrated mostly on the Mbishkodra plain, where the largest city is to be found, the cultural and economic centre of Shkodër. The mountainous areas of the county is sparsely populated, where the population density falls. The largest lake of Southern and Southeastern Europe, the Lake Shkodër sprawls in the east and is shared with Montenegro.

With more than 150,000 inhabitants, the county is the sixth most populous county in Albania, the second most populous county in the Northern Region. The county is ethnically a homogeneous county and mostly inhabited by Gheg Albanians. In addition, Egyptians, Montenegrins and Greeks also are present in the ethnic composition of the local population. The country has no official religion and freedom of religion is a right defined by the Constitution of Albania, and the most widely professed religion in the county is Roman Catholicism and Islam.

== Geography ==
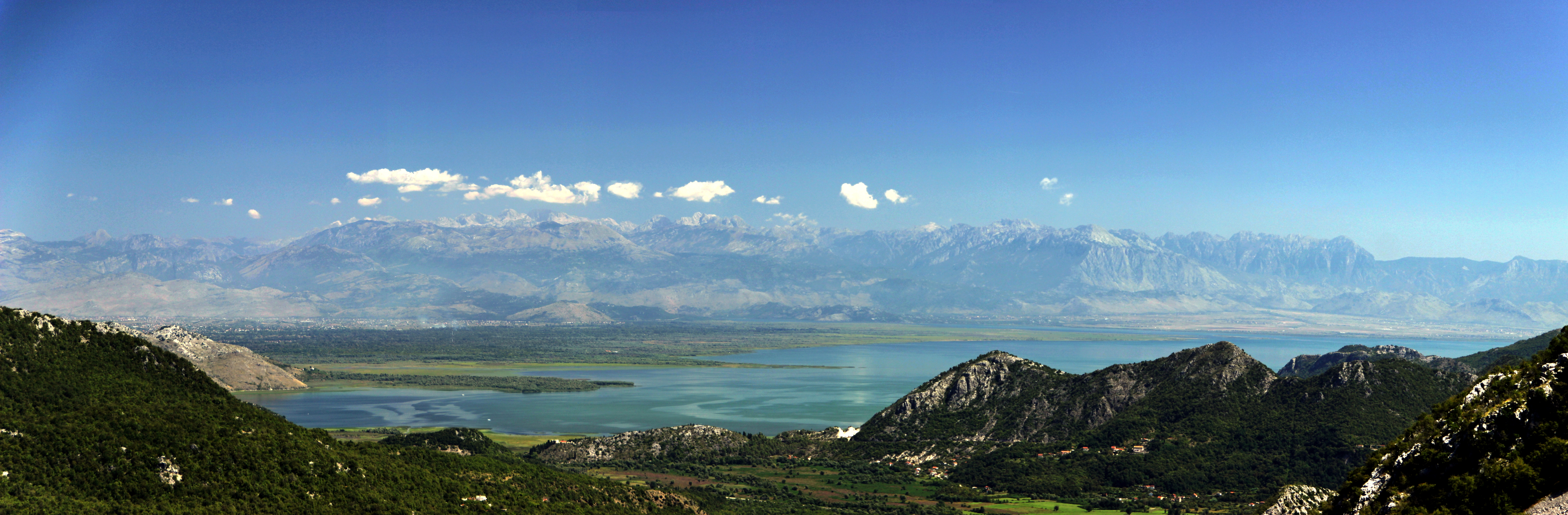
A panoramic view over the Lake Shkodër and the Albanian Alps in the distance.

Shkodër is one of 12 counties of Albania, located in the west of the Northern Region. It lies between latitudes 42° N, and longitudes 20° E. The county area is 3,562 km^{2} (1,375 sq mi) and the second largest county by area in Albania and the largest in the Northern Region. It is limited to the counties of Kukës to the northeast and east, Lezhë to the southeast and south, the country of Montenegro in the north and the Adriatic Sea in the southwest.

The county has a wide variety of topographical sets and natural landscapes. The Albanian Alps, which extends in the north of the county toward Montenegro, is a primarily mountainous region with a high terrain. The alps delineated several sedimentary basins such as the Mbishkodra basin in the center. The highest point in the county is Maja Jezercë at 2,694 m (8,839 ft) above the Adriatic in the northeast shared with Kukës County. The lowest spot is 0 m (0 ft) above the Adriatic, located in the southwest of the county.

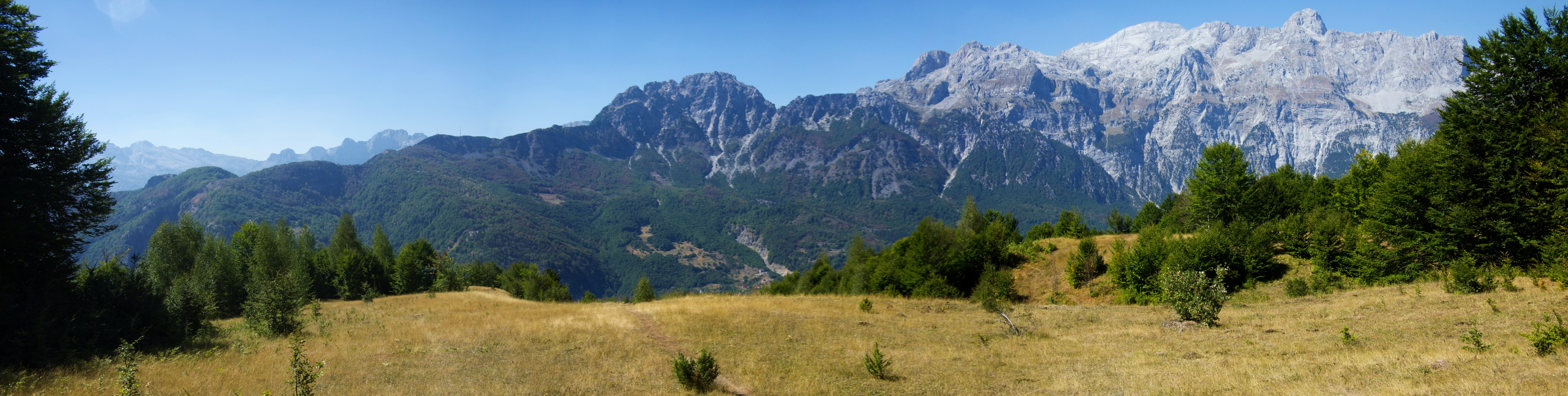
The eastern section of the Radohima mountain massif inside the Albanian Alps.

Due to the considerable variation in altitude, it makes for a wide range of climate types. The Adriatic Sea in the west and Albanian Alps in the north have a great influence to the climate of the county. Most of the county has a usually rainy and hot mediterranean climate as defined by the Köppen climate classification. Mean monthly temperature ranges between −2 °C (28 °F) in January and 25 °C (77 °F) in August. The mean annual precipitation ranges between 1,800 millimetres (71 inches) and 300 millimetres (12 inches) depending on longitude and latitude and prevailing climate type.

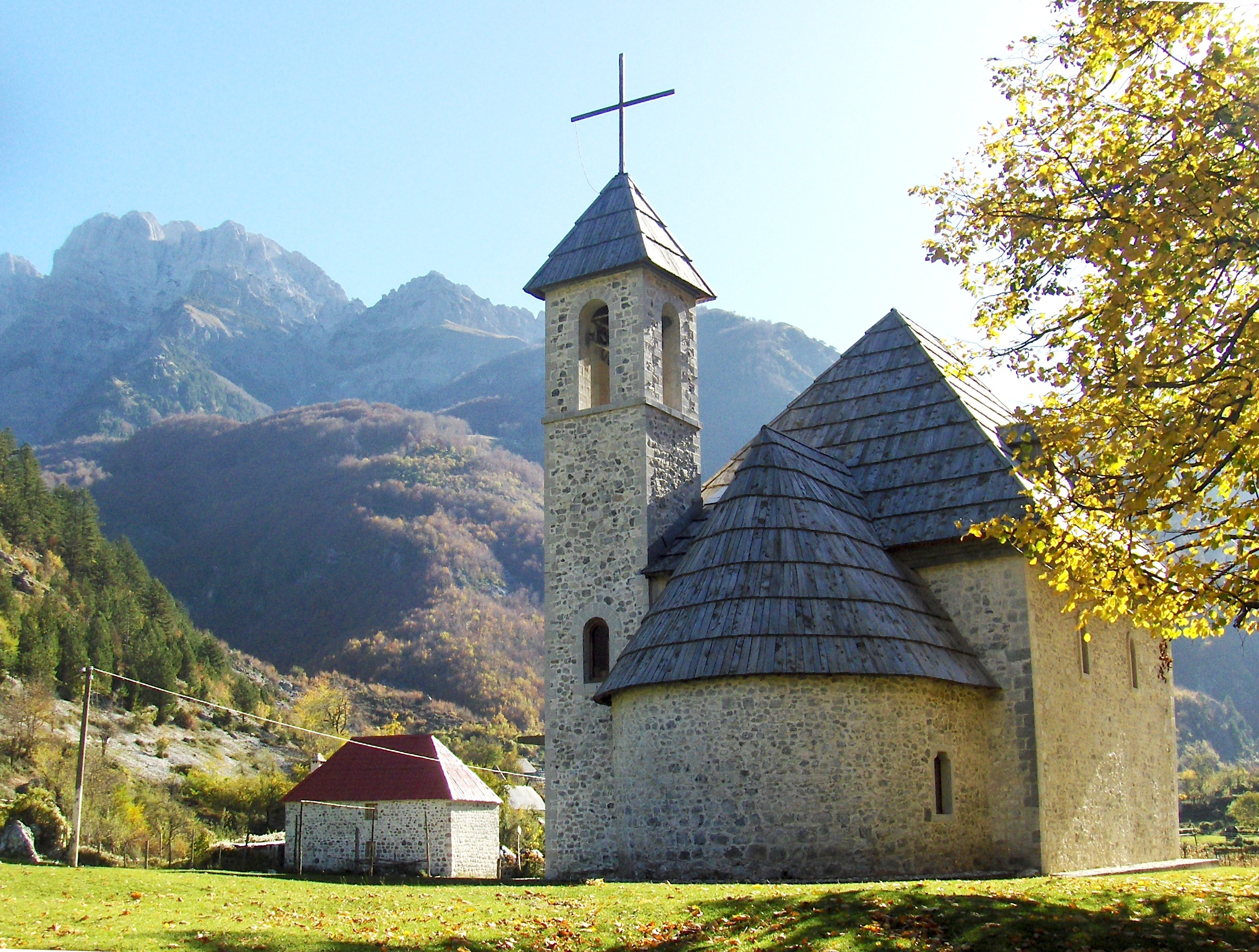
The Catholic church of Theth.

=== Protected areas ===
Phytogeographically, the county falls within the Dinaric Mountains mixed forests and Illyrian deciduous forests terrestrial ecoregions of the Palearctic Temperate broadleaf and mixed forest and Mediterranean forests, woodlands, and scrub. Inside the county, there are a national park, a nature park and a protected landscape, which include the Theth National Park, Nikaj-Mërtur Regional Nature Park and the Buna River-Velipoja Protected Landscape. The northern bound of the county forms a part of the European Green Belt, which serves as a retreat for endangered mammal and plant species.

== Demographics ==
Historical population
Year	Pop.	±%
1950	121,208	—
1960	150,774	+24.4%
1969	190,036	+26.0%
1979	234,028	+23.1%
1989	285,258	+21.9%
2001	256,473	−10.1%
2011	215,347	−16.0%
2023	154,479	−28.3%

The county of Shkodër is the 6th most populous county in the Republic of Albania. The Institute of Statistics (INSTAT) estimated the population at 154,479 in 2023. Ethnically, Shkodër County is 95.87% Albanian, 0.10% Serbo-Montenegrin, 0.52% Roma or Balkan Egyptian, and the remainder belonging to a smaller assortment of ethnic groups.

=== Religion ===
According to the 2023 census, Shkodër was mainly home to Muslims and Catholics, with much smaller numbers of other Christians and non-religious people. It had the highest religious affiliation rate in Albania, with 91.5% identifying with a faith. Between the 2011 and 2023 censuses in Shkodër, the religious landscape showed some shifts, although Catholic Christians and Muslims remained the dominant groups. The Sunni Muslim population increased its share from 44.8% to 47.1%, while Bektashi Muslims also saw a slight rise from 0.1% to 0.2%. The Catholic Christian population saw a decrease, declining from 47.2% to 43.5%. Orthodox Christians remained stable at 0.4%. Evangelical Christians rose slightly from 0.1% to 0.2%.

There was a notable increase in the irreligious population, though from a low base: atheists rose from 0.1% to 0.3%, and those identifying as believers without denomination grew significantly from 0.3% to 1.9%. Meanwhile, the "Not stated/other" category saw a slight decrease, dropping from 7.0% to 6.2%.

Population of Shkodër according to religious group (2011–2023)
Religion group	Census 2011		Census 2023		Difference (2023−2011)	
Religion group	Number	Percentage	Number	Percentage	Number	Percentage
Sunni Muslim	96,568	44.8%	72,734	47.1%	-23,834	-24.68%
Bektashi Muslim	147	0.1%	309	0.2%	+162	+0.1%
Total Muslim	96,715	44.9%	73,043	47.3%	-23,672	-24.67%
Catholic Christian	101,617	47.2%	67,271	43.5%	-34,346	-3.7%
Orthodox Christian	813	0.4%	683	0.4%	-130	+0.0%
Evangelical	188	0.1%	323	0.2%	+135	+0.1%
Total Christian*	102,656	47.7%	68,316	44.2%	-34,340	-3.5%
Atheists	304	0.1%	540	0.3%	+236	+0.2%
Believers without denomination	673	0.3%	2,966	1.9%	+2,293	+1.6%
Total Non-religious	977	0.5%	3,506	2.3%	+2,529	+1.8%
Not stated / other**	14,999	7.0%	9,614	6.2%	-5,385	-0.8%
TOTAL	215,347	100%	154,479	100%	-60,868	–

== Gallery ==
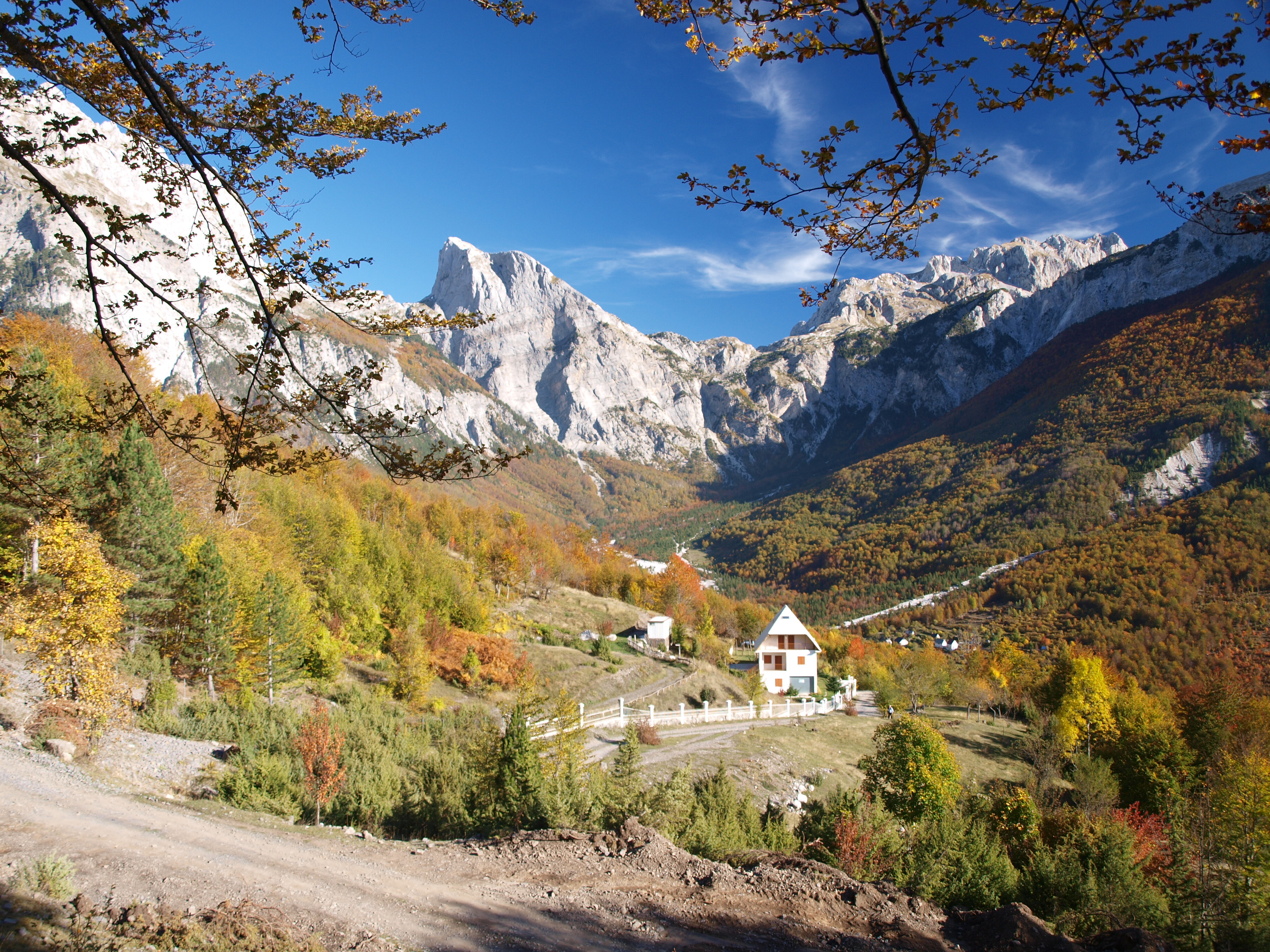
Theth

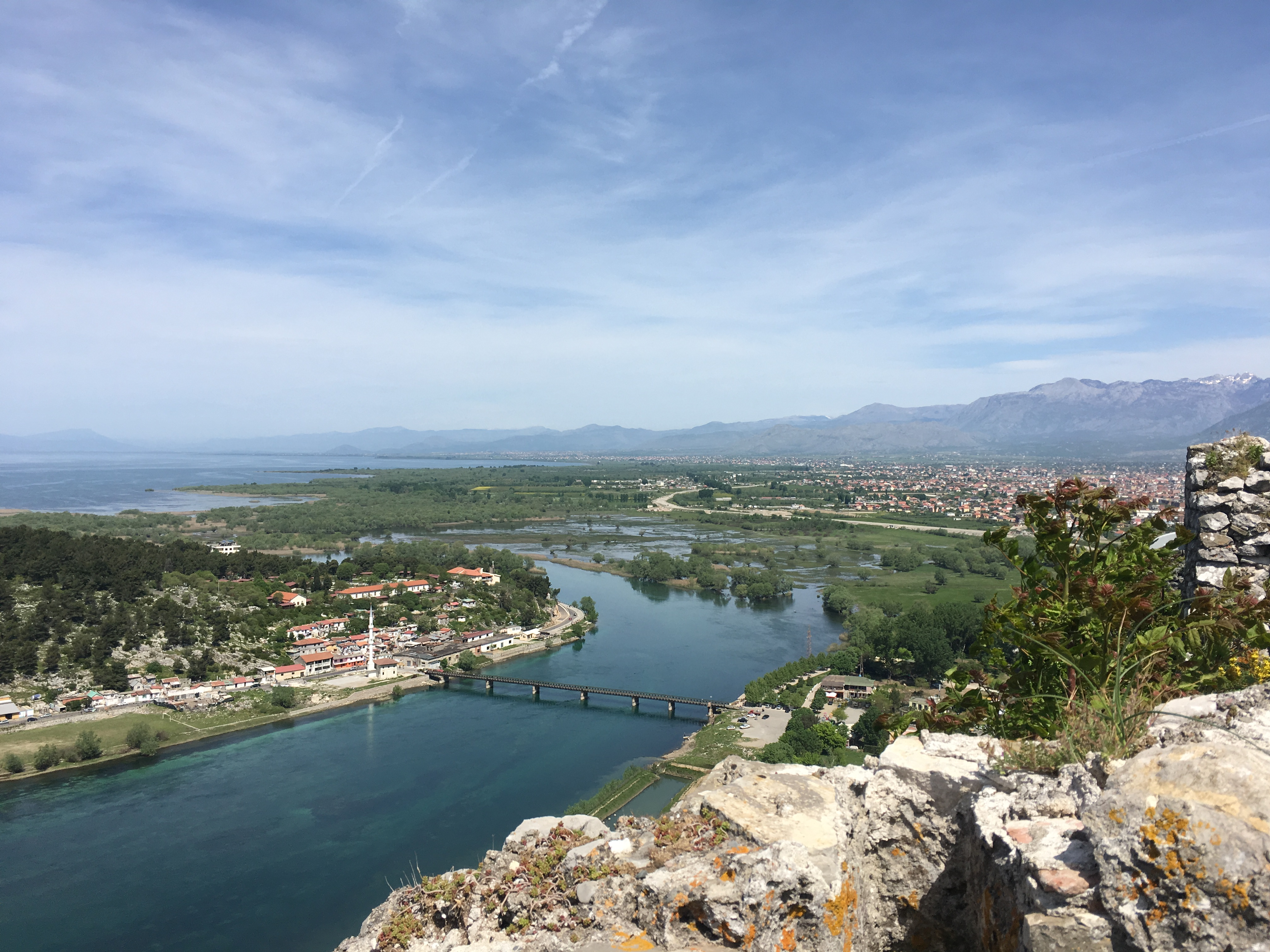
Buna river

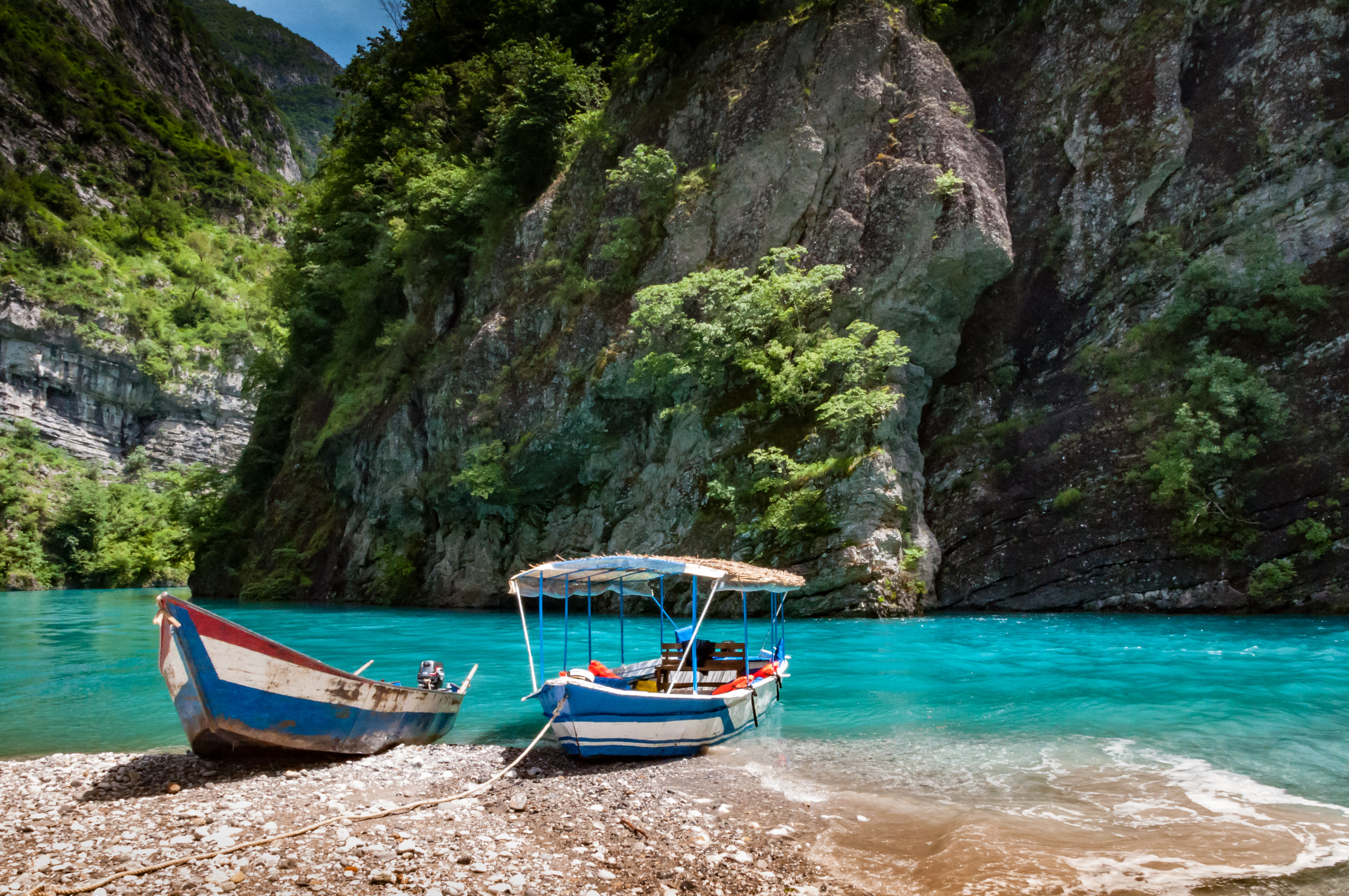
Lake Koman

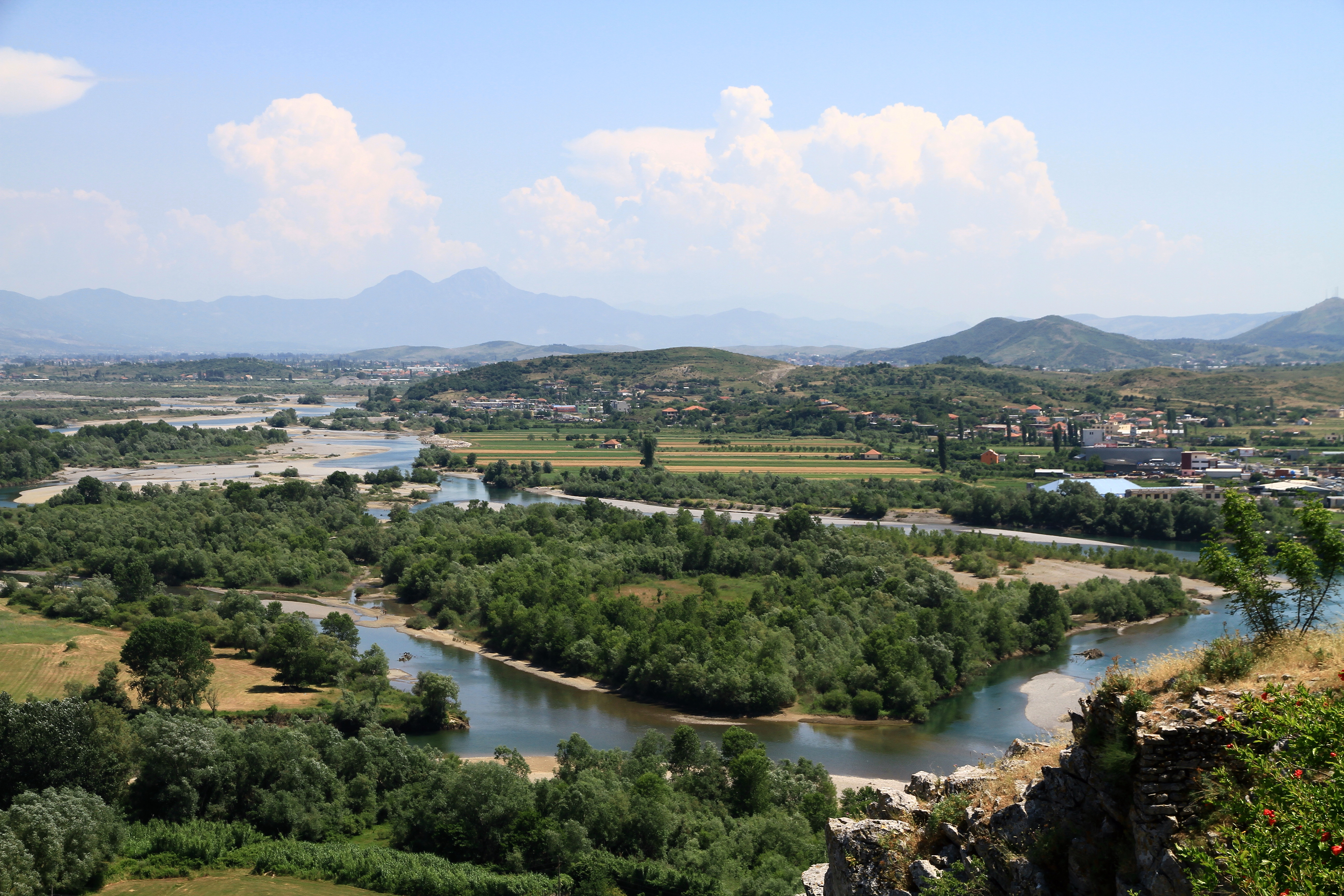
Drin Delta

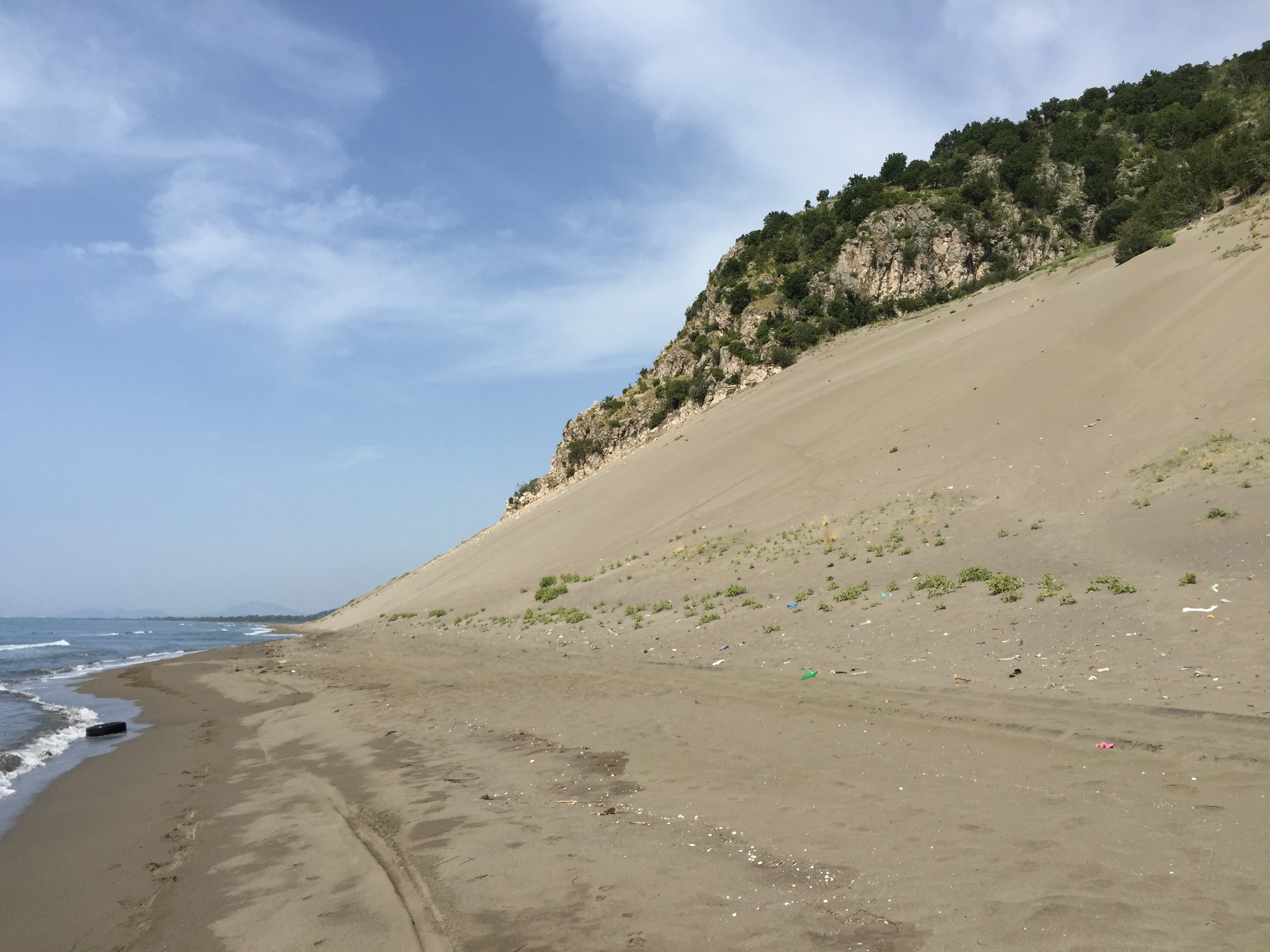
Rana e Hedhun

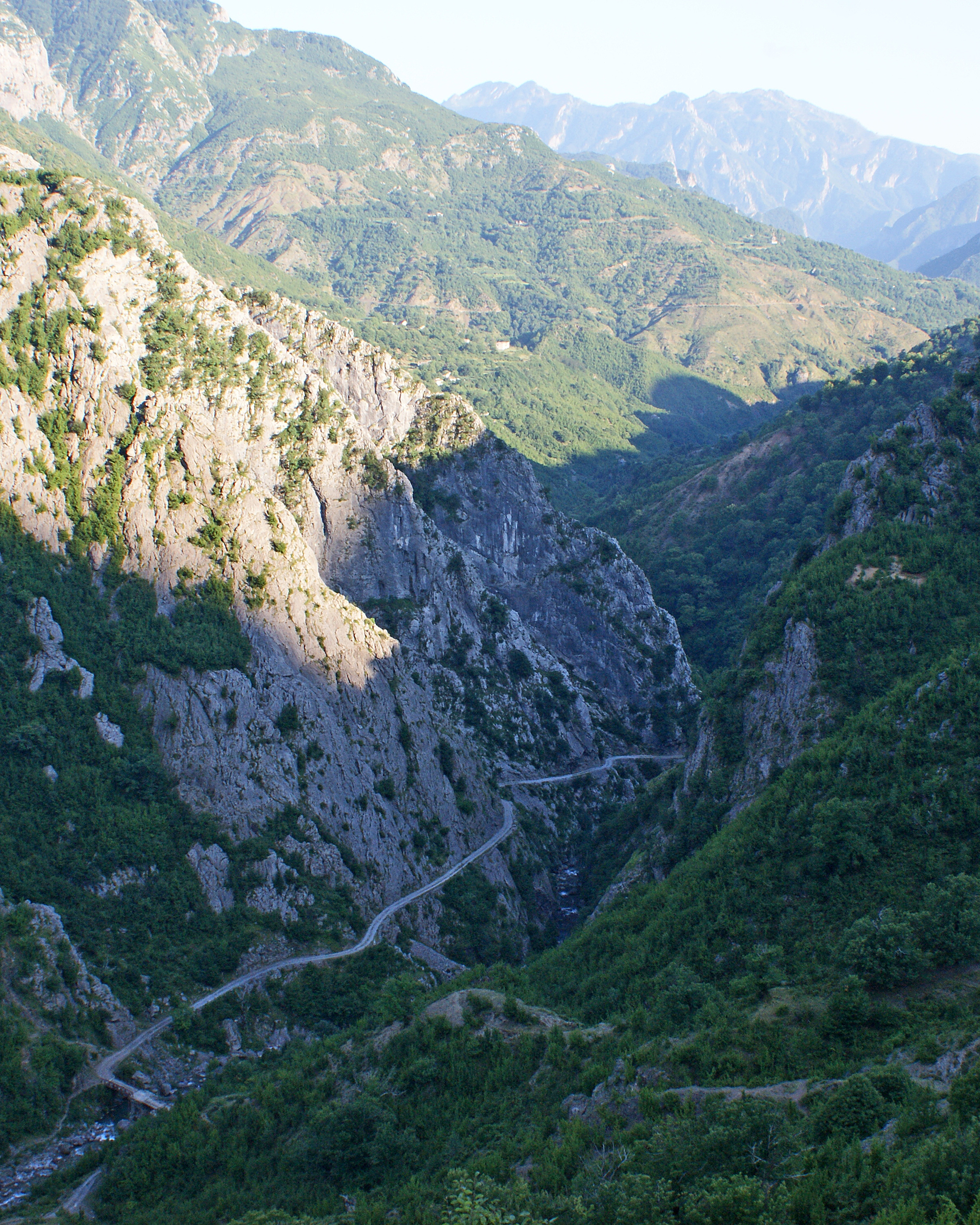
Kir Gorge

== See also ==
- Geography of Albania
- Politics of Albania
- Divisions of Albania
