= Northern Albania =

NUTS-2 region of Albania

Coordinates: 42°N 20°E

Northern Albania Shqipëria Veriore
- Region
- Interactive map of Northern Albania
- Country: Albania

Area
  - Total: 10,829 km^{2} (4,181 sq mi)

Population (2023)
  - Total: 649,902
  - Density: 60.015/km^{2} (155.44/sq mi)
- NUTS code: AL01
- HDI (2017): 0.787 high · 3rd of 3

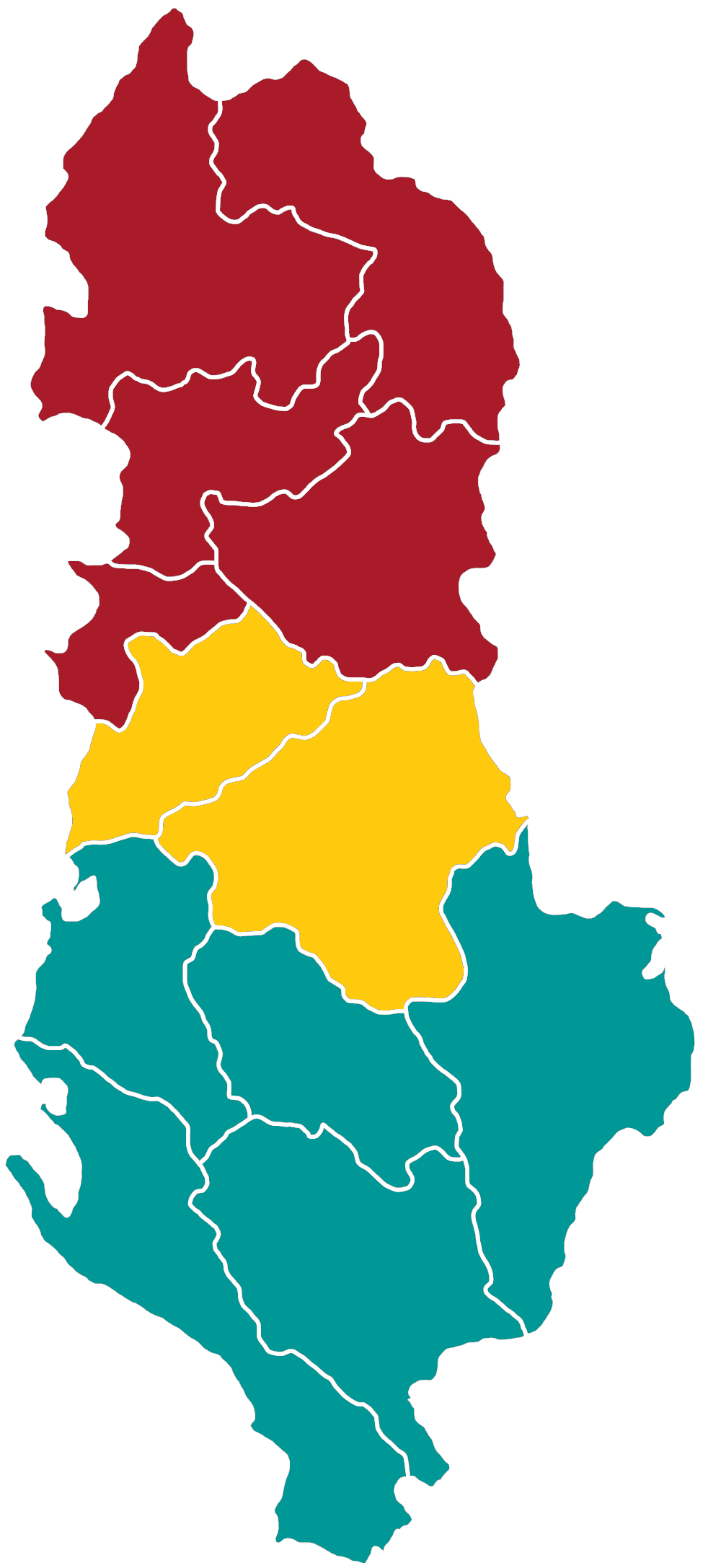
Northern Albania (red) in Albania

Northern Albania (Albanian: Shqipëria Veriore) is one of the three NUTS-2 regions of Albania, along with Central Albania and Southern Albania (Toskeria). It consists of the counties of Dibër, Durrës, Kukës, Lezhë and Shkodër.

Historically and in ethnography, Northern Albania has been called Ghegeria (also spelled Gegeria; Albanian: Gegëria, Gheg Albanian: Gegnia), a name derived from a subgroup of Albanians known as the Ghegs.

== Definitions ==
The Nomenclature of Territorial Units for Statistics (NUTS) is a geocode classification used by the European Union to divide up member states for statistical purposes. Albania has level 1, 2, and 3 divisions; Northern Albania is a second-level, or NUTS-2, region. Central Albania and Southern Albania are the other NUTS-2 regions of Albania. The NUTS-2 region of Northern Albania includes five counties: Dibër, Durrës, Kukës, Lezhë and Shkodër.

In ethnographical and historical contexts, Northern Albania is also known as Ghegeria (Gegëria) and includes parts of the Albanian-inhabited territories of Kosovo, Montenegro, North Macedonia and Serbia. The name Ghegeria is derived from the Ghegs, a dialectical subgroup of Albanians who predominantly live in the mountainous areas north of the Shkumbin River.

== Economy ==
Northeastern Albania has substantial deposits of minerals, including chromium, copper, and iron-nickel. Albania was a leading producer of chromium during the 1980s, but production steeply declined in the early 1990s as a consequence of the end of communism in the country.

== Demographics ==
Historical population
Year	Pop.	±%
1989	1,041,447	—
2001	962,081	−7.6%
2011	831,498	−13.6%
2023	649,902	−21.8%
Source: INSTAT

The five counties of Northern Albania had a combined population of 649,902 as of the 2023 census.

== See also ==
- Central Albania
- Southern Albania (Toskeria)
