= Prefectures of Albania =

Former administrative divisions of Albania

Albania was divided into prefectures from 1913 to 1953 and from 1992 to 2002.

10 prefectures around 1925:

- Berat Prefecture
- Dibër Prefecture
- Durrës Prefecture
- Elbasan Prefecture
- Gjirokastër Prefecture
- Korçë Prefecture
- Kukës Prefecture
- Shkodër Prefecture
- Tirana Prefecture
- Vlonë Prefecture
