= Durrës County =

County in central Albania

Durrës County Qarku i Durrësit (Albanian)
- County
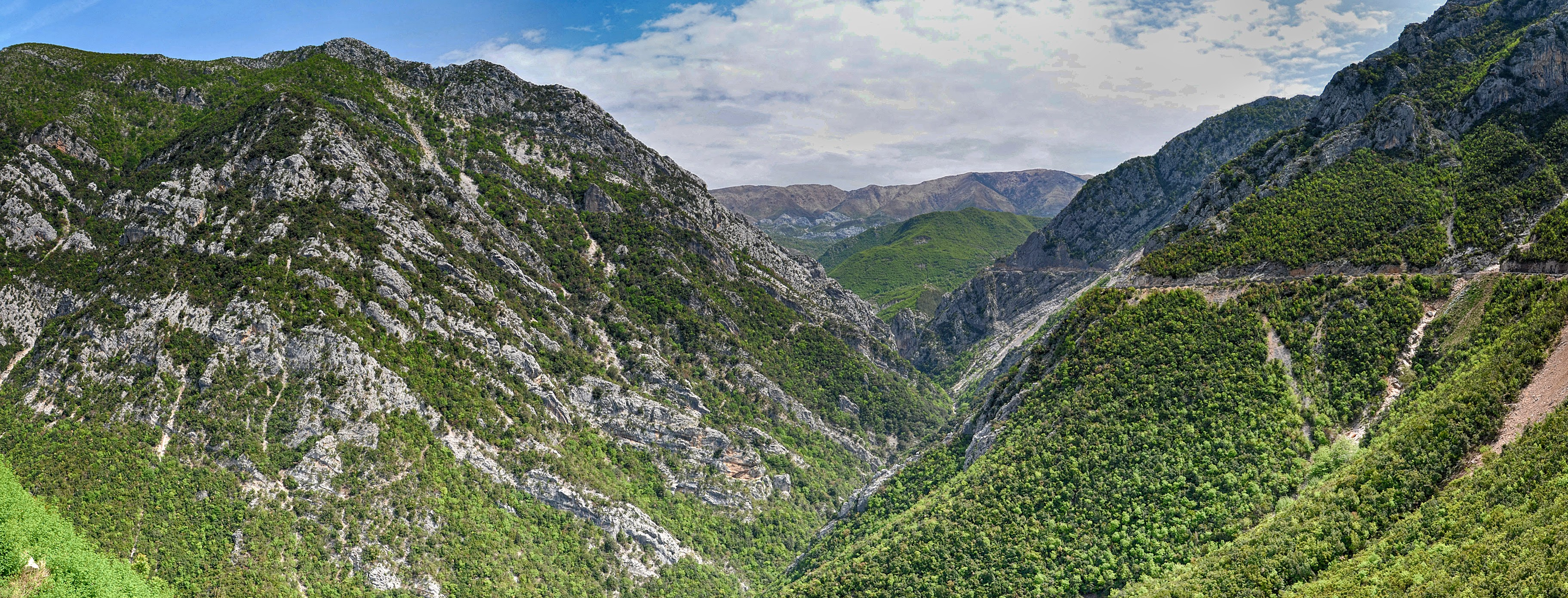
- Qafshtama National Park

- Flag Emblem

- Map of Albania with Durrës County highlighted
- Coordinates: 41°23′N 19°30′E
- Country: Albania
- Seat: Durrës
- Subdivisions: 3 municipalities: Durrës; Krujë; Shijak

Government
  - Council chairman: Alfred Mullaraj (PS)

Area
  - Total: 766 km^{2} (296 sq mi)
  - Rank: 12th

Population (2021)
  - Total: 292,029
  - Rank: 2nd
  - Density: 381/km^{2} (987/sq mi)
- Time zone: UTC+1 (CET)
  - Summer (DST): UTC+2 (CEST)
- 0.840 very high · 3rd of 12: HDI (2023)
- NUTS Code: AL012
- Website: qarkudurres.gov.al

Durrës County (Albanian: Qarku i Durrësit), officially the County of Durrës (Albanian: Qarku i Durrësit), is a county in the Northern Region of the Republic of Albania. It is the smallest by area and the second most populous of the twelve counties, with 292,029 people within an area of 766 km^{2} (296 sq mi). The county borders on the Adriatic Sea to the west, the counties of Lezhë to the north, Dibër to the east and Tirana to the south. It is divided into three municipalities, Durrës, Krujë and Shijak, with all of whom incorporate sixteen administrative units.

The county has geographically a coastline on the Albanian Adriatic Sea Coast and extends in the Western Lowlands on a flat alluvial and coastal plain. The east is characterised by the Skanderbeg Mountains which splits the Western Lowlands from the Central Mountain Range. Its climate is profoundly determined by its proximity to the Mediterranean Sea and its considerable change in terrain.

The central city Durrës is one of largest cities on the Adriatic Sea and ranks 5th with a population of 175,110 and one of the world's oldest continuously inhabited cities. Durrës is home to Albania's main port, the Port of Durrës. The port is also the 10th largest cargo port on the Adriatic Sea that handle more than 3.4 million tonnes of cargo per year. The historical city of Krujë is the second largest city in Durrës County.

== Geography ==
Durrës County is defined within an area of 766 km^{2} (296 sq mi) and is located in the Northern Region of the Republic of Albania bordering the Adriatic Sea to the west, the counties of Lezhë to the north, Dibër to the east and Tirana to the south. The county lies between latitudes 41° and 23° N and longitudes 19° and 30° E.

Because of its proximity to the Mediterranean Sea, several rivers, large and small, flow throughout the county. The Ishëm is the longest river in the county originating at the Skanderbeg Mountains in Tirana County and flowing through the county until it reaches the Adriatic Sea at the Cape of Rodon along the Gulf of Drin. The Erzen, the second longest river in the county, begins nearby the village of Shëngjergj, flows into northwest and empties into the sea at the Gjiri i Lalzit.

The city of Krujë is found at an altitude of 600 m (1,969 ft) on the foot of Mount Krujë (Albanian: Mali i Krujës) of the Krujë Gorge, while south and west of the town is found the plain of the Ishëm River. The town is located in the northern part of the outer Albanides tectonic unit, which consists of anticlines of Mesozoic carbonate platforms.

=== Climate ===
The climate is generally Mediterranean but varies by local topography. There are diverse microclimates in the county. Summers are dry while heavy rains are experienced during the winter.

== Demographics ==
Historical population
Year	Pop.	±%
1989	218,530	—
2001	245,179	+12.2%
2011	262,785	+7.2%
2023	226,863	−13.7%

Durrës County is the second most populous and densely populated county of the Republic of Albania, with an increasing number of population. The Institute of Statistics (INSTAT) estimated the county's population in January 2021 at 292,029. At the 2011 census, there were 263,711 people living in the county with a population density of 343 people per square kilometres.

Ethnically, Durrës County is predominantly Albanian but small minorities of Bosniaks (near Shijak), Aromanians (in Fllakë), Romani & Balkan Egyptians are present in the ethnic composition as well. By language, 99.5% spoke Albanian as a first language. Other spoken languages were Romani (0.12%), Greek (0.05%), Macedonian (0.05%), Italian (0.02%), Turkish (0.02%) and Aromanian (0.02%).

=== Settlements ===
Largest urban areas by population as of 2011.
Rank	Administrative unit	Municipality	Population
1	Durrës	Durrës	113,249
2	Rrashbull	Durrës	24,081
3	Fushë-Krujë	Krujë	18,477
4	Sukth	Durrës	15,966
5	Xhafzotaj	Shijak	22,633
6	Kodër-Thumanë	Krujë	12,335
7	Krujë	Krujë	11,721
8	Katund i Ri	Durrës	10,161
9	Nikël	Krujë	9,518
10	Shijak	Shijak	7,568

There are three municipalities (bashkia) and 16 administrative units (njësi administrative) incorporated in Durrës County. The majority of its population is predominantly concentrated in the county's capital city of Durrës. As of the 2011 Census, the population of the administrative unit Durrës stands at 113,249 with the adjacent eponymous municipality having a population of 175,110. Other units with a population over 10,000 include Fushë-Krujë, Katund i Ri, Kodër-Thumanë, Krujë, Rrashbull, Sukth and Xhafzotaj.

=== Religion ===
According to the 2023 census, Durrës was mainly home to Muslims, followed by Catholics and other Christian groups, alongside a notable non-religious population. Overall, 69.3% of residents identified with a religion. Between the 2011 and 2023 censuses in Durrës, there were notable shifts in religious affiliation. The Sunni Muslim population decreased significantly from 67.5% to 54.6%, while Bektashi Muslims saw a notable increase, rising from 1.6% to 5.3%. The Catholic Christian population declined from 7.4% to 6.0%, and Orthodox Christians decreased slightly from 3.3% to 3.0%. Evangelical Christians saw a modest rise from 0.1% to 0.3%.

There was a very substantial increase in the irreligious population: atheists rose from 1.1% to 1.6%, and those identifying as believers without denomination grew dramatically from 3.5% to 13.3%. Meanwhile, the "Not stated/other" category remained relatively stable, slightly increasing from 15.5% to 15.7%.

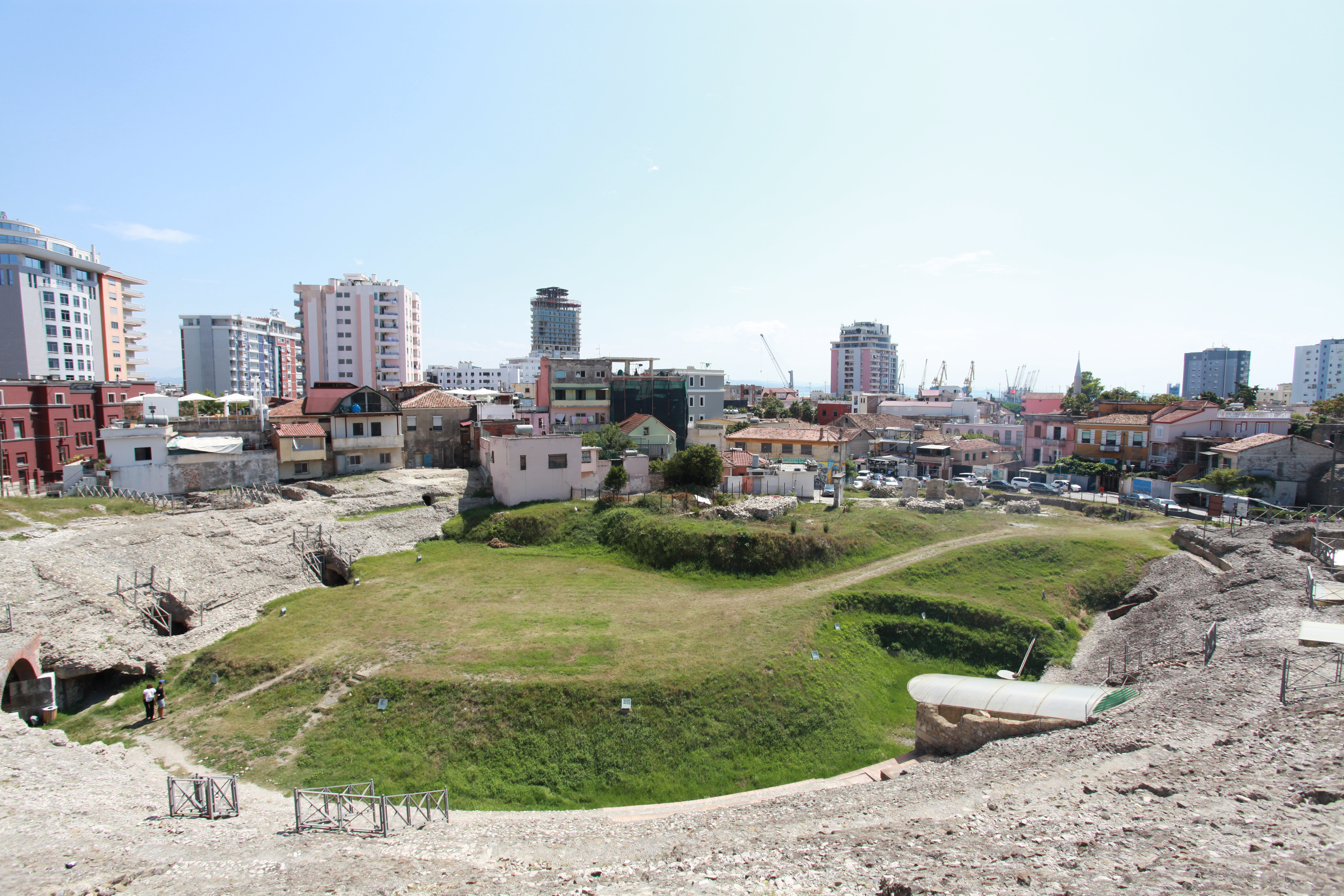
Durrës

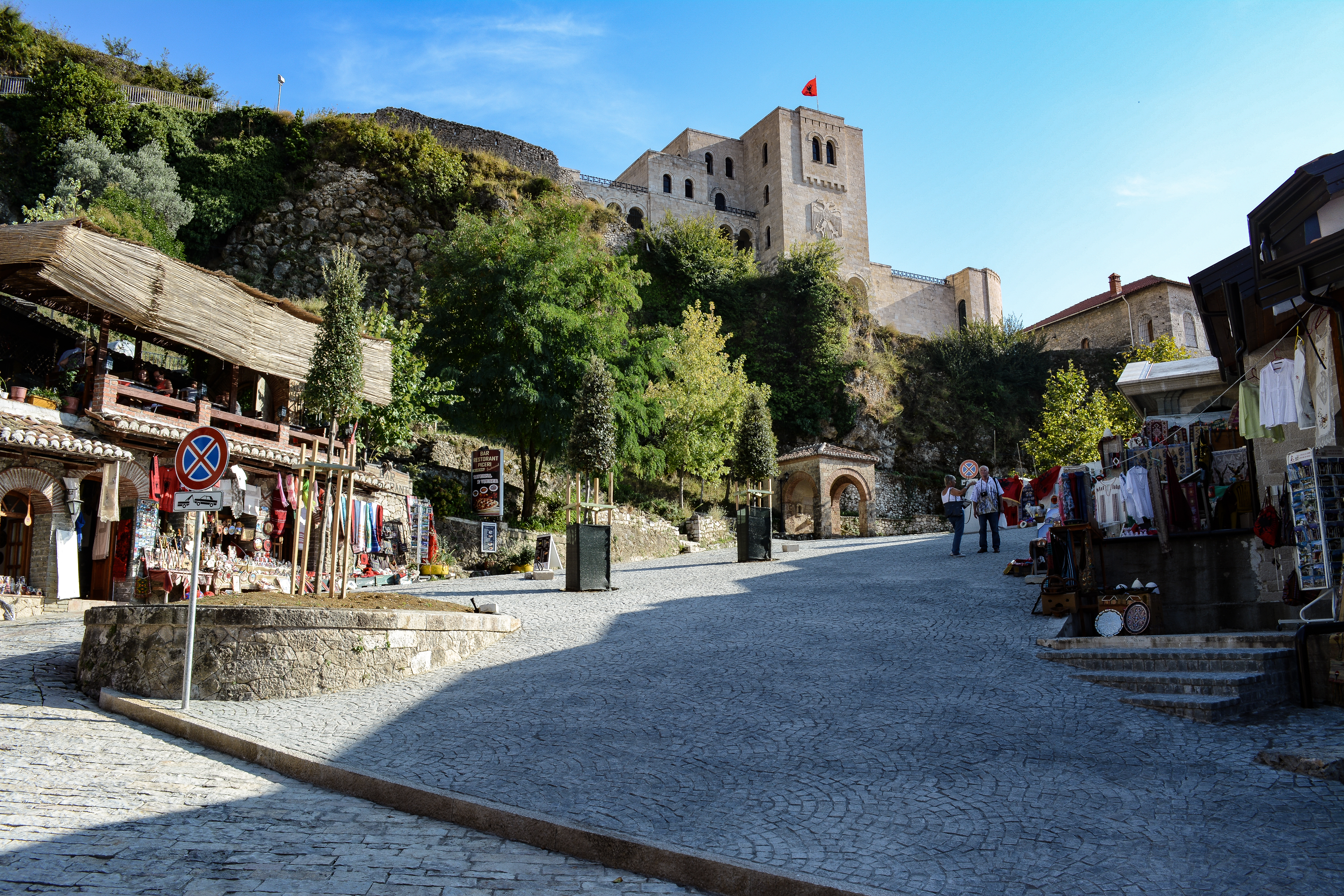
Krujë

Population of Durrës according to religious group (2011–2023)
Religion group	Census 2011		Census 2023 (Revised Source)		Difference (2023−2011)	
Religion group	Number	Percentage	Number	Percentage	Number	Percentage
Sunni Muslim	177,274	67.5%	123,890	54.6%	-53,384	-12.9%
Bektashi Muslim	4,215	1.6%	12,070	5.3%	+7,855	+3.7%
Total Muslim	181,489	69.1%	135,960	59.9%	-45,529	-9.2%
Catholic Christian	19,322	7.4%	13,637	6.0%	-5,685	-1.4%
Orthodox Christian	8,675	3.3%	6,713	3.0%	-1,962	-0.3%
Evangelical	325	0.1%	779	0.3%	+454	+0.2%
Total Christian*	28,489	10.8%	21,369	9.4%	-7,120	-1.4%
Atheists	2,901	1.1%	3,682	1.6%	+781	+0.5%
Believers without denomination	9,131	3.5%	30,210	13.3%	+21,079	+9.8%
Total Non-religious	12,032	4.6%	33,892	14.9%	+21,860	+10.3%
Not stated / other**	40,775	15.5%	35,642	15.7%	-5,133	+0.2%
TOTAL	262,785	100%	226,863	100%	-35,922	–

== See also ==
- Geography of Albania
- Politics of Albania
- Divisions of Albania
