= Southern Albania =

NUTS-2 region of Albania

Coordinates: 40°22′N 20°9′E

Southern Albania Shqipëria jugore
- Region
- Interactive map of Southern Albania
- Country: Albania

Area
  - Total: 12,989 km^{2} (5,015 sq mi)

Population (2023)
  - Total: 761,118
  - Density: 58.597/km^{2} (151.77/sq mi)
- NUTS code: AL03
- HDI (2017): 0.803 high · 2nd of 3

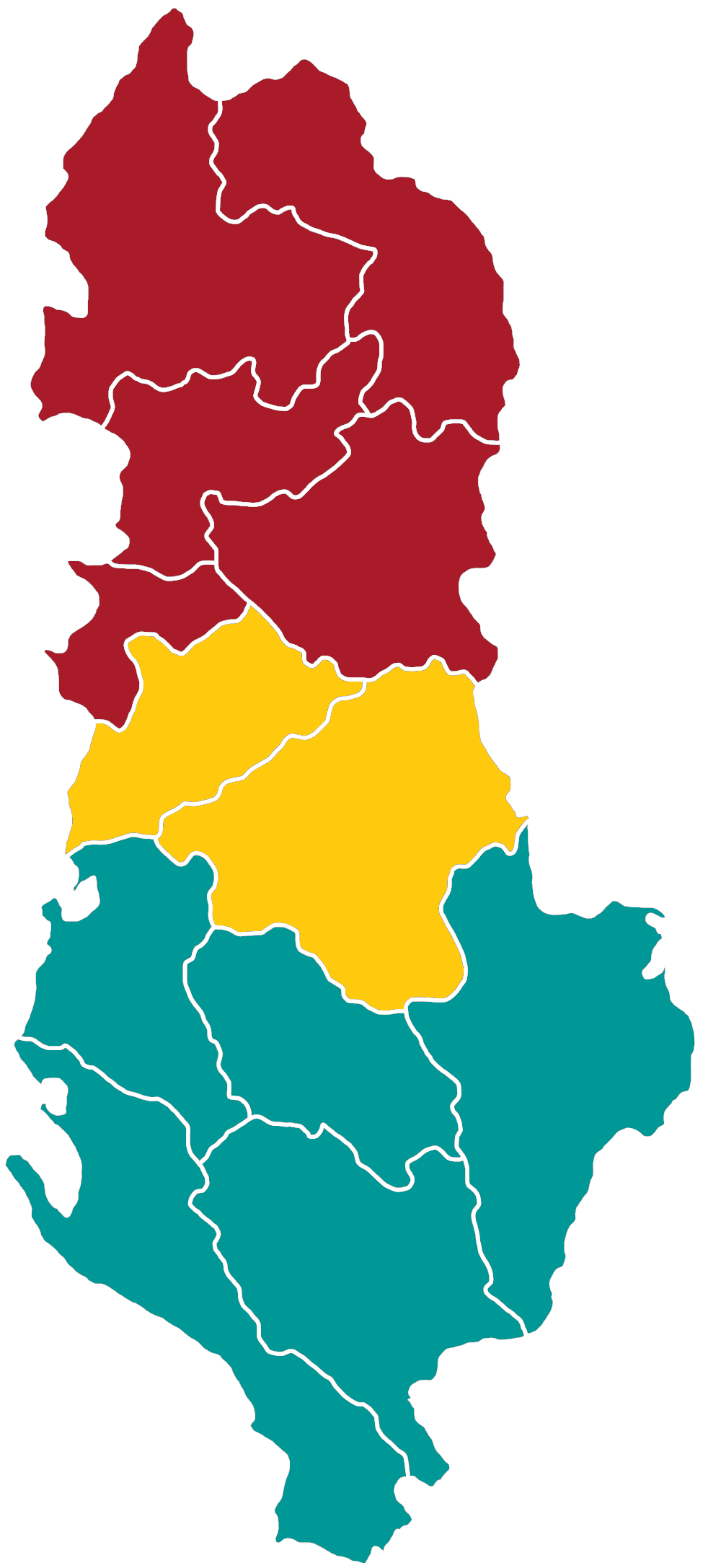
Southern Albania (green) in Albania

Southern Albania (Albanian: Shqipëria jugore) is one of the three NUTS-2 Regions of Albania.

It consists of five counties: Berat, Fier, Gjirokastër, Korçë and Vlorë. Combined, they have a population of 700,000 as of the 2023 census.

Historical population
Year	Pop.	±%
1950	595,187	—
1960	760,962	+27.9%
1969	909,880	+19.6%
1979	1,105,409	+21.5%
1989	1,334,245	+20.7%
2001	1,146,559	−14.1%
2011	920,448	−19.7%
2023	761,118	−17.3%

The southwestern part of the country is rich in petroleum, and natural gas. Natural asphalt is mined near Selenicë.

Four main ethnographic regions traditionally compose Southern Albania: Myzeqeja, Toskeria, Laberia, and part of Chameria. In a broader context, Toskeria (Albanian: Toskëria) is sometimes used to describe the whole cultural and linguistic area of southern Albanians (also broadly referred to as Tosks), in duality with Ghegeria, which on the other hand is used for that of northern Albanians (also broadly referred to as Ghegs).

== See also ==
- Northern Albania (Ghegeria)
- Central Albania
- Southern Albanian Highlands
