= List of counties of Albania by Human Development Index =

The Human Development Index (HDI) of Albania for 2023 is 0.810, which corresponds to rank List of countries by Human Development Index 71 out of 193 countries and territories around the world.

This article presents a list of counties of Albania by Human Development Index (HDI), which is a comparative measure of life expectancy, education, literacy, standard of living, per capita income and overall well-being of the citizens in each counties of Albania.

== Human Development Index ==
=== Methodology ===
Introduced by the United Nations Development Programme (UNDP) in 1990, the Human Development Index (HDI) is a composite statistic of education, income and longevity indices, calculated in order to measure social and economic development within countries. It consists of a number between 0 and 1, comprising five tiers of human development—very low, low, medium, high, or very high—wherein the development is considered higher when closer to 1. According to the latest Human Development Report, published in 2025 and reflecting data from 2023, Albania placed List of countries by Human Development Index 71 among 193 countries with an HDI value of 0.810.

Rank	County	HDI (2023)
Very high human development
1	Tirana	0.860
2	Vlorë	0.840
3	Durrës	0.840
4	Gjirokastër	0.833
5	Korçë	0.828
6	Shkodër	0.821
7	Elbasan	0.820
8	Berat	0.819
–	Albania (average)	0.810
9	Lezhë	0.806
10	Fier	0.804
High human development
11	Dibër	0.790
12	Kukës	0.789

== See also ==
- Counties of Albania
- List of countries by Human Development Index
