= Institute of Statistics (Albania) =

Albanian governmental institution

- Instituti i Statistikave
- Official logo

Government agency overview
- Formed: 8 April 1940 (86 years ago)
- Jurisdiction: Assembly of Albania
- Headquarters: Rr. Vllazën Huta, N. 35, H. 1, Tirana 1017, Albania
- Government agency executive: Elsa Dhuli, Director General
- Website: www.instat.gov.al

The Institute of Statistics (Albanian: Instituti i Statistikave – INSTAT) is an independent public legal entity tasked with producing official statistics in the Republic of Albania.

INSTAT is organized at the central level, with regional statistical offices at the local level that operate within its organizational structure, which is approved by a decision of the Assembly, in accordance with the provisions of the legislation in force for independent institutions.

== Overview ==
The statistical service in the Republic of Albania is carried out by the Institute of Statistics. In 1924, a statistical office was created that kept various economic records at the Ministry of Public Works and Agriculture. The activity of this office was limited to agricultural inventories that included the number of farmers and the type and amount of land use with agricultural and livestock plants, as well as some detailed statistics on industry, trade, export-imports and prices. The statistical service was eventually institutionalized by Decree no. 121, dt. 8/04/1940.

The statistical system that followed, was established by Decision no. 35, dt. 13.01.1945 with the creation of the Directorate of Statistics, a subordinate institution of the Council of Ministers. Later, this directorate came under the jurisdiction of the State Planning Commission.

Today, pursuant to law no. 17, dated 05.04.2018 "On official statistics", this system consists of a number of institutions responsible for producing official statistics and other institutions, public or otherwise, which produce statistics in various fields for monitoring or implementing their developmental policies. The National Statistical System carries out its activities in accordance with the aforementioned law and the multi-year Statistics Program which is approved by a special decision of the Assembly.

== See also ==
- Demographics of Albania
- List of national and international statistical services
- Eurostat
