= Local government =

Lowest tier in the public administration pyramid

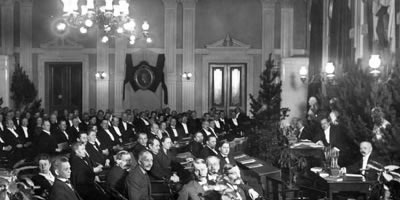
Meeting of Jyväskylä's city council in 1925

Local government is a generic term for the lowest tiers of governance or public administration within a particular sovereign state. A municipal council or local council is the legislative body of a municipality or local government area. Depending on the location and classification of the municipality it may be known as a city council, town council, town board, community council, borough council, rural council, village council, board of aldermen, or board of selectmen.

Local governments typically constitute a subdivision of a higher-level political or administrative unit, such as a nation or state. Local governments generally act within the powers and functions assigned to them by law or directives of a higher level of government. In federal states, local government generally comprises a third or fourth level of government, whereas in unitary states, local government usually occupies the second or third level of government.

The institutions of local government vary greatly between countries, and even where similar arrangements exist, country-specific terminology often varies. Common designated names for different types of local government entities include counties, districts, cities, townships, towns, boroughs, parishes, municipalities, municipal corporations, shires, villages, and local government areas. The same term may be used in different countries to refer to local governance institutions with vastly different institutional features, powers, or functions.

In addition to general-purpose local governments, some countries have special-purpose local governments (special districts), such as independent school districts, elected water boards, or local service districts.

Although there is no single, commonly accepted definition of the term, the most precise definition of local governments is provided by the International Monetary Fund (IMF), which divides the general government sector into three sub-sectors (central, state, and local government) and defines local governments as "institutional units whose fiscal, legislative, and executive authority extends over the smallest geographical areas distinguished for administrative and political purposes."

The IMF further notes that local governments "typically provide a wide range of services to local residents," while "the scope of their authority is generally much less than that of central government or state governments, and they may or may not be entitled to levy taxes." They are often heavily dependent on grants (transfers) from higher levels of government, and they may also act, to some extent, as agents of central or regional governments. They should also be able to appoint their own officers, independently of external administrative control. Even when local governments act as agents of central or state governments to some extent, they can be treated as a separate level of government, provided they are also able to raise and spend some funds on their own initiative and own responsibility."

Other definitions for local governments are less prescriptive and emphasize the political or representative nature of local governments. For instance, OECD defines local governments as "decentralized entities whose governance bodies are elected through universal suffrage and which has general responsibilities and some autonomy with respect to budget, staff and assets." The Local Public Sector Alliance defines local government institutions as "a corporate body (or institutional unit) that performs one or more public sector functions within a [local] jurisdiction that has adequate political, administrative, and fiscal autonomy and authority to respond to the needs and priorities of its constituents".

Questions regarding the empowerment of local government institutions, the structure and nature of local political leadership, and the extent of local self-governance and municipal autonomy are key questions of public administration and governance. Local elections are held in many countries.

== Africa ==
=== Egypt ===
Egypt has a centralised system of local government officially called local administration as it is a branch of the Executive. The country is divided into 27 governorates (محافظة muḥāfaẓah; Egyptian Arabic pronunciation: [moˈħɑfzˤɑ]; genitive case: muḥāfaẓat [moˈħɑfzˤet]; plural: محافظات muḥāfaẓāt [moħɑfˈzˤɑːt]), the top tier of local administration. A governorate is administered by a governor, who is appointed by the President of Egypt and serves at the president's discretion.

Governors have the civilian rank of minister and report directly to the prime minister, who chairs the Board of Governors and meets with them on a regular basis. The Minister of Local Development coordinates the governors and their governorate's budgets.

=== Mali ===
In recent years, Mali has undertaken an ambitious decentralization program, which involves the capital district of Bamako, seven regions subdivided into 46 cercles, and 682 rural community districts (communes). The state retains an advisory role in administrative and fiscal matters, and it provides technical support, coordination, and legal recourse to these levels. Opportunities for direct political participation, and increased local responsibility for development have been improved.

In August–September 1998, elections were held for urban council members, who subsequently elected their mayors. In May/June 1999, citizens of the communes elected their communal council members for the first time. Female voter turnout was about 70% of the total, and observers considered the process open and transparent. With mayors, councils, and boards in place at the local level, newly elected officials, civil society organizations, decentralized technical services, private sector interests, other communes, and donor groups began partnering to further development.

Eventually, the cercles will be reinstituted (formerly grouping arrondissements) with a legal and financial basis of their own. Their councils will be chosen by and from members of the communal councils. The regions, at the highest decentralized level, will have a similar legal and financial autonomy, and will comprise a number of cercles within their geographical boundaries. Mali needs to build capacity at these levels, especially to mobilize and manage financial resources.

=== Nigeria ===
Nigeria as a federal republic operates three tiers of government: federal (or central), states and local government. The country's constitution provides for each local government (which exists in a single tier countrywide), and its development areas and autonomous communities created by individual state legislation to have democratically elected local government heads. There is a ministry (or bureau) of local government and chieftaincy affairs in each state charged with the responsibility of administration at that level. Nigeria has a total of 774 Local Government Areas (LGAs).

=== South Africa ===
South Africa has a two-tiered local government system comprising local municipalities which fall into district municipalities, and metropolitan municipalities which span both tiers of local government. The country has eight metropolitan municipalities, 44 district municipalities and 205 local municipalities.

The largest cities are governed by metropolitan municipalities, often called "metros". An example of such is the City of Cape Town, which operates using a City Council (with a City Manager) as head of the executive, and a Mayor as head of the ruling party locally, and overall city governance. A Deputy Mayor is also appointed.

Metropolitan municipalities govern a total of 24.8 million people, as of the 2022 Census, which constitutes around 40% of the South African population. Outside metros, the rest of the country is governed jointly by district and local municipalities. District municipalities have broader functions, such as integrated planning, infrastructure development, and public transit. Local municipalities have responsibility for all municipal functions not assigned to the district, including local service delivery. Municipalities operate within specific jurisdictions, and can set local bylaws that are quite far-reaching. However, major laws are still set by the provincial and national governments. City budgets are audited annually. Local governments (municipal councils) are elected during municipal elections, held every five years.

== Asia ==
=== Afghanistan ===
Afghanistan was traditionally divided into provinces governed by centrally appointed governors with considerable autonomy in local affairs. There are currently 34 provinces. During the Soviet occupation and the development of country-wide resistance, local areas came increasingly under the control of mujaheddin groups that were largely independent of any higher authority; local commanders, in some instances, asserted a measure of independence also from the mujaheddin leadership in Pakistan, establishing their own systems of local government, collecting revenues, running educational and other facilities, and even engaging in local negotiations. Mujaheddin groups retained links with the Peshawar parties to ensure access to weapons that were doled out to the parties by the government of Pakistan for distribution to fighters inside Afghanistan.

The Taliban set up a shura (assembly), made up of senior Taliban members and important tribal from the area. Each shura made laws and collected taxes locally. The Taliban set up a provisional government for the whole of Afghanistan, but it did not exercise central control over the local shuras.

The process of setting up the transitional government in June 2002 by the Loya Jirga took many steps involving local government. First, at the district and municipal level, traditional shura councils met to pick electors—persons who cast ballots for Loya Jirga delegates. Each district or municipality had to choose a predetermined number of electors, based on the size of its population. The electors then traveled to regional centers and cast ballots, to choose from amongst themselves a smaller number of loya jirga delegates— according to allotted numbers assigned to each district. The delegates then took part in the Loya Jirga.

The warlords who rule various regions of the country exert local control. The transitional government is attempting to integrate local governing authorities with the central government, but it lacks the loyalty from the warlords necessary to its governing authority. More traditional elements of political authority—such as Sufi networks, royal lineage, clan strength, age-based wisdom, and the like—still exist and play a role in Afghan society. Karzai is relying on these traditional sources of authority in his challenge to the warlords and older Islamist leaders. The deep ethnic, linguistic, sectarian, tribal, racial, and regional cleavages present in the country create what is called "Qawm" identity, emphasizing the local over higher-order formations. Qawm refers to the group to which the individual considers himself to belong, whether a subtribe, village, valley, or neighborhood. Local governing authority relies upon these forms of identity and loyalty.

=== Armenia ===
Armenia is subdivided into eleven administrative divisions. Of these, ten are provinces, known as marzer (մարզեր) or in the singular form marz (մարզ) in Armenian.

=== Azerbaijan ===
Azerbaijan is administratively divided into the following subdivisions: 67 districts (rayonlar), 11 cities (şəhərlər). The Nakhchivan Autonomous Republic is a territorial exlcave, which itself contains: 7 districts and a city. The rayons are further divided into municipalities. (Bələdiyyə).

=== Bangladesh ===
Bangladesh is divided into eight administrative divisions, each named after their respective divisional headquarters: Barisal, Chittagong, Dhaka, Khulna, Rajshahi, Sylhet, Rangpur and Mymensingh Division.

Divisions are divided into zila. There are 64 zila in Bangladesh, each further divided into upazila or thana. The area within each police station, except for those in metropolitan areas, is divided into several unions, with each union consisting of multiple villages. In the metropolitan areas, police stations are divided into wards, which are further divided into mahallas. There are no directly elected officials at the divisional or district levels, although elected chairs of subdistricts also sit on district councils. Direct elections are held for each union (or ward), electing a chairperson and a number of members. In 1997, a parliamentary act was passed to reserve three seats (out of 12) in every union for female candidates.

Dhaka is the capital and largest city of Bangladesh. The cities with a city corporation, having mayoral elections, include Dhaka South, Dhaka North, Chittagong, Narayanganj , Sylhet, Rajshahi, Bogura , Barisal, Rangpur, Comilla, Mymensingh and Gazipur. Other major cities, these and other municipalities electing a mayor and councilors for each ward, include , Gopalganj, Jessore, Dinajpur, Saidapur, Naogaon and Rangamati. Both the municipal heads are elected for a span of five years.

=== Brunei ===
The administrative divisions of Brunei mainly consist of daerah, mukim and kampung or kampong. They are organised hierarchically, with daerah being the first level and kampong the third level. All the administrative divisions are under direct governance of the government through the Ministry of Home Affairs. There are four districts in Brunei: Brunei-Muara, Belait, Tutong and Temburong. The administrative level of mukim lies below the district. At present, there are 38 mukims, with 17 in Brunei-Muara, 8 in Tutong, 8 in Belait and 5 in Temburong District. A mukim is headed by a penghulu. A village (Malay: kampung or kampong) is the lowest administrative level in Brunei and headed by a ketua kampong or village head. Its population varies from a few hundreds to tens of thousands.

=== China ===
Municipal councils exist in the People's Republic of China, these are designated as Municipal People's Congress in many sub-provincial cities and direct-administered municipalities such as the Shanghai Municipal People's Congress.

==== Hong Kong ====
Established as the Sanitary Board in 1883, the Municipal Council in Hong Kong Island and Kowloon (including the New Kowloon) provided municipal services to the covered regions in the then British Hong Kong. Partial elections were allowed in 1887, though merely enabling selected persons to vote for members of the Board. The Board was reconstituted in 1935 and hence renamed as Urban Council in the following year after the government had passed the Urban Council Ordinance. Democratisation had been implemented, allowing universal suffrage to happen throughout its development. Two years after the Transfer of sovereignty over Hong Kong, the council was disbanded in 1999 by the then Chief Executive of Hong Kong Special Administrative Region. All members of the council were elected through universal suffrage by the time of the dissolution.

The counterpart of the Municipal Council serving the New Territories (excluding New Kowloon) was the Regional Council established as the Provisional Regional Council in 1986. The functional select committees, district committees, and sub-committees constituted the entire Regional Council. All members were elected from the constituencies and district boards.

Both of the Municipal Councils in Hong Kong are now defunct.

=== Georgia ===
The subdivisions of Georgia are autonomous republics (Georgian: ავტონომიური რესპუბლიკა, avtonomiuri respublika), regions (მხარე, mkhare), and municipalities (მუნიციპალიტეტი, munits'ipaliteti).

=== India ===
Hierarchical chart of the administrative structure of India

Local government is the third tier of government in India, after Union Government and State Government. The urban local bodies (municipalities) are for urban governance and panchayati raj institutions (panchayats) for rural governance.

The Urban Local Bodies (ULBs): are Municipal Corporation, Municipal Council (municipality) and Town panchayat (notified area council).

The Panchayati Raj Institutions (PRIs), knowns as "Panchayats" are a three-tier system of local self-government in rural areas in India: District Panchayat (district level), Block Panchayat (block level) and Village Panchayat (village level).

In India, a municipal council (also referred to as a municipal committee, municipal board) functions as the elected governing body of a municipality, which is the local government institution for smaller urban areas. A municipality is generally divided into wards. Residents of each ward elect a representative called a municipal councillor, and together these councillors constitute the municipal council.

The council is headed by a chairperson or president, assisted by a vice-chairperson or vice-president. Council meetings are presided over by the chairperson. For administrative purposes, the state government appoints a chief executive officer or municipal secretary, who oversees day-to-day operations and implements council decisions.

Municipalities are established by the respective State Municipal Acts, enacted under the framework of Part IXA of the Constitution (74th Amendment Act, 1992). The composition, powers, and functions of municipal councils are defined by state legislation.

In larger urban areas, municipal corporations serve as the local governing bodies, while municipal councils generally administer smaller towns and urban centres.

=== Israel ===
The Israeli Ministry of Interior recognizes three types of local government in Israel:

- Cities: 71 single-level urban municipalities, usually with populations exceeding 20,000 residents.
- Local councils: 141 single-level urban or rural municipalities, usually with populations between 2,000 and 20,000.
- Regional Councils: 54 bi-level municipalities which govern multiple rural communities located in relative geographic vicinity. The number of residents in the individual communities usually does not exceed 2000. There are no clear limits to the population and land area size of Israeli regional councils.
- Industrial councils: Two single-level municipalities which govern large and complex industrial areas outside cities. The local industrial councils are Tefen in Upper Galilee (north of Karmiel) and Ramat Hovav in the Negev (south of Beer Sheva).

Israeli municipal elections are scheduled every five years, and apply to all local governments in the country, Jewish and Arab alike.

=== Japan ===
Since the Meiji restoration, Japan has had a local government system based on prefectures. The national government oversees much of the country. Municipal governments were historical villages. Now mergers are common for cost effective administration. There are 47 prefectures. They have two main responsibilities. One is mediation between national and municipal governments. The other is area wide administration. Municipal councils are parliamentary bodies established in local authorities in accordance with Article 93 of the Constitution of Japan and Article 89 of the Local Autonomy Act, etc. The Yokohama and Osaka City Councils are examples.

=== Malaysia ===
Local government is the lowest level in the system of government in Malaysia—after federal and state. Councillors are not elected in local-level elections which have been abolished in 1976, but rather appointed by state governments. It has the power to collect taxes (in the form of assessment tax), to create laws and rules (in the form of by-laws) and grants licenses and permits for any trade in its area of jurisdiction, in addition to providing basic amenities, collecting and managing waste and garbage as well as planning and developing the area under its jurisdiction.

=== Nepal ===
Gaunpalika (Rural Council) and Nagarpalika (Municipal council) are the local level divisions in Nepal. Which is ruled by third level of government after Federal and Provincial government. In Nepal there are total 753 local levels government (including 6 Metropolises, 11 Sub-metropolises, 276 Municipalities and 460 Gaunpalikas). And there are total 6,743 wards are formed under these 753 local levels. These local government are ruled by local leaders and the Mayor is the supreme of each local government which is elected every 5 (Five) year by local public.

=== Pakistan ===
Local government is the third tier of government in Pakistan, after Federal Government and Provincial Government. There are three types of administrative units of local government in Pakistan: District Government Administrations, Town Municipal Administrations and Union Council Administrations

There are over five thousand local governments in Pakistan. Since 2001, these have been led by democratically elected local councils, each headed by a Nazim (the word means "supervisor" in Urdu, but is sometimes translated as Mayor). Some districts, incorporating large metropolitan areas, are called City Districts. A City District may contain subdivisions called Towns and Union Councils. Council elections are held every four years. District Governments also include a District Coordination Officer (DCO), who is a civil servant in-charge of all devolved departments. Currently, the Powers of Nazim are also held by the DCO.

=== Palestinian Authority ===
Local government in the Palestinian National Authority-controlled areas are divided into three main groups: Municipal councils, village council and local development committees.

- Municipality (Palestinian Authority): Depends on size of locality. Localities that serve as the centers of governorates and populations over 15,000 have 15-member councils. Localities with populations over 15,000 residents have 13-member councils and localities with populations between 4,000 and 15,000 have 9-member councils.
- Village Council (Palestinian Authority): Localities with populations between 800 and 1,500 have 3-member councils while those between 1,500 and −4,000 residents have 7-member councils.

=== Philippines ===
The Local Government Code of 1991 provides for the three levels of Local Government Units or LGUs in the Philippines: (1) the province (2) city and municipality, and (3) the barangay. The country remains a unitary state and the National Government continues to have strong influence over local government units.

A province is led by a governor along with the Sangguniang Panlalawigan (Provincial Council) composed of board members. A mayor leads a city or municipality while the Sangguniang Panlungsod (City Council) and the Sangguniang Bayan (Municipal Council) constitute the legislative branches of a city and municipality, respectively. A barangay is headed by the Barangay Captain and the Barangay Council. Barangays can be further divided into puroks and sitios but their leadership is unelected.

The 1987 Philippine Constitution also provides for the existence of autonomous regions. The Bangsamoro Autonomous Region in Muslim Mindanao (BARMM) is the only autonomous region in the Philippines. There was an attempt to institute an autonomous region in the Cordillera, but that failed and instead the Cordillera Administrative Region (CAR) was established.

Local governments have limited taxing authority. Most of their funds come from the national government via the Internal Revenue Allotment

All municipalities have their own municipal council, and these are officially called: "Sangguniang Bayan". Cities have a similar but separate form of legislature called "Sangguniang Panlungsod" (literally "city council"). The Local Government Code of 1991 established the current local government structure, including municipal councils. City councils range from 12, in most cities, to 38 members, such as the Manila City Council. Members of city councils are called "councilors".

=== Saudi Arabia ===
There are three levels of local government in the Kingdom of Saudi Arabia: the city council, the municipal council and the municipality.

The city council is the highest level of local government. The municipal councils began in 2005 and is the second level of local government. The municipality is the third level of local government. There are 178 municipalities across the kingdom. The first began in Jeddah during the Othmanic period. Each municipality is run by its city's mayor. Collectively, the kingdom's municipalities make up the Ministry of Municipality and Rural Affairs (MoMRA).

=== Singapore ===
In Singapore, town councils are in charge of maintaining the common areas of Housing and Development Board (HDB) flats and estates, such as the common corridors, void decks, lifts, water tanks, external lighting and the open spaces surrounding the estates. They are regulated under the Town Councils Act (Cap. 329A, 2000 Rev. Ed.).

The rationale was to delegate the duties of estate management to the members of parliament in addition to their existing responsibilities. They would also gain management experience and be accountable to their district's resident voters.

Town councils boundaries are drawn based on electoral districts boundaries. A town council area can consist of a Group Representation Constituency (GRC), a Single Member Constituency (SMC), or a collection of neighbouring GRCs and SMCs controlled by the same political party. The Members of Parliament head the town councils of their constituencies. Town councils boundaries do not correspond to new town boundaries; different parts of the same HDB town may be managed by different town councils.

=== Taiwan ===
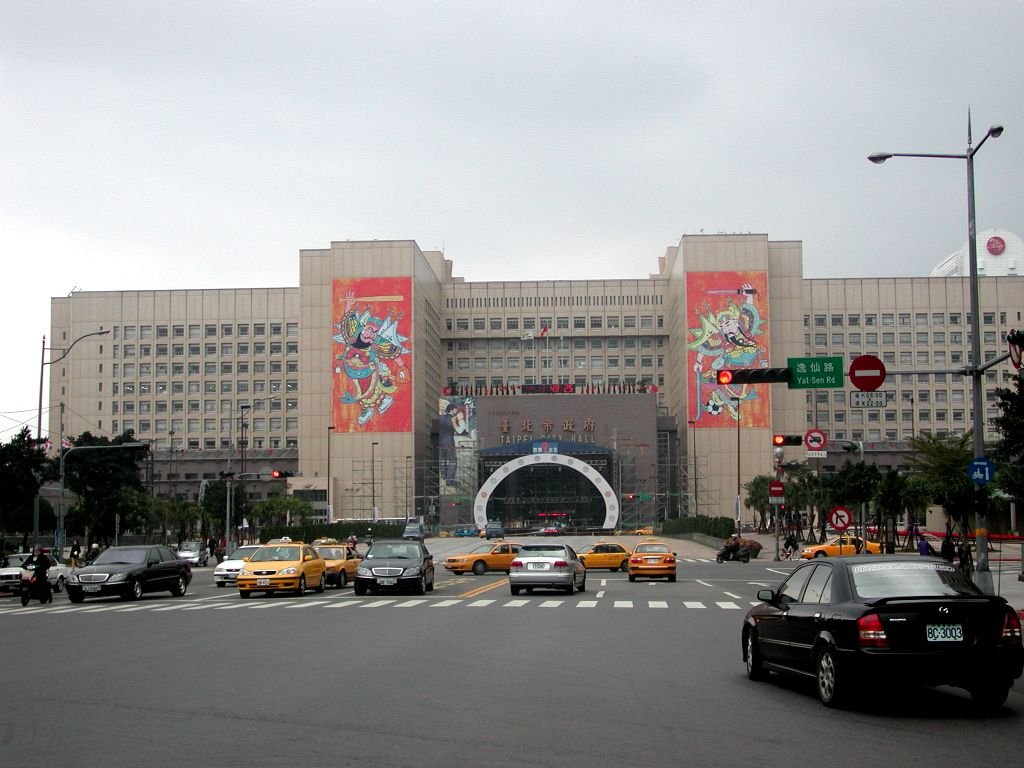
Taipei City Government

The Republic of China government in Taiwan consists of special municipality governments, provincial city governments and county governments for their local governments. They also have councils in each of those three local government levels.

=== Turkey ===
Turkey has two levels of local government; provinces (Turkish: iller) and districts (Turkish: ilçeler).

The territory of Turkey is subdivided into 81 provinces for administrative purposes. The provinces are organized into 7 regions for census purposes; however, they do not represent an administrative structure. Each province is divided into districts, for a total of 957 districts.

=== Vietnam ===
Vietnam has 3 levels of local government:

- First tier: municipalities (thành phố) and provinces (tỉnh)
- Second tier: provincial cities (thành phố), district-level towns (thị xã) and rural districts (huyện)
- Third tier: wards (phường), towns (thị trấn) and communes (xã)

Each level has a People's Committee (executive – up to third tier), a People's Council (legislative – up to third tier) and a People's Court (judiciary – up to second tier).

== Europe ==
=== Albania ===
Since its Declaration of Independence from the Ottoman Empire in 1912, Albania has reformed its internal divisions 21 times. Before the implementation of the 1998 Constitution, the primary division was into about 36 districts (Albanian: rrethe), whose number, size, and importance varied over time. Following their abolishment in the year 2000, the counties were divided into urban (bashki) and rural municipalities (komuna) until the 2015 elections, when they were replaced by the current system.

Presently, Albania has 3–4 levels of local government :

- 12 counties (qarqet), sometimes known as prefectures (prefekturë) or administrative divisions
- 61 municipalities (bashki)
- 373 administrative units (Albanian: njësi administrative), sometimes known as communes (komuna), which also oversee about 3,000 villages (fshatra)

The prefects who oversee each county are appointed by the central government, but the mayors of the municipalities and the local government councils are elected democratically.

=== Andorra ===
Andorra is formed by seven parishes (Catalan: parròquies, singular - parròquia); Andorra la Vella, Canillo, Encamp, La Massana, Escaldes-Engordany, Ordino, Sant Julià de Lòria.

Some parishes have a further territorial subdivision. Ordino, La Massana and Sant Julià de Lòria are subdivided into quarts (quarters), while Canillo is subdivided into 10 veïnats (neighborhoods). Those mostly coincide with villages, which are found in all parishes. Each parish has its own elected mayor who is the nominal head of the local government known as a comú in Catalan.

=== Belarus ===
At the top level of administration, Belarus is divided into six regions and the city of Minsk, which has a special status being the capital of Belarus. Minsk is also the capital of Minsk Region.

At the second level, the regions are divided into raions ("districts").

=== Bulgaria ===
Since the 1880s, the number of territorial management units in Bulgaria has varied from seven to 26. Between 1987 and 1999 the administrative structure consisted of nine provinces (oblasti, singular oblast). A new administrative structure was adopted in parallel with the decentralisation of the economic system. It includes 27 provinces and a metropolitan capital province (Sofia-Grad). All areas take their names from their respective capital cities. The provinces subdivide into 264 municipalities.

Municipalities are run by mayors, who are elected to four-year terms, and by directly elected municipal councils. Bulgaria is a highly centralised state, where the national Council of Ministers directly appoints regional governors and all provinces and municipalities are heavily dependent on it for funding.

=== Croatia ===
Croatia is divided into 20 counties and the capital city of Zagreb, the latter having the authority and legal status of a county and a city at the same time. The counties subdivide into 127 cities and 429 municipalities.

=== Czech Republic ===
The highest tier of local government in the Czech Republic are the thirteen regions (Czech: kraje, singular kraj) and the capital city of Prague. Each region has its own elected Regional Assembly (krajské zastupitelstvo) and hejtman (usually translated as hetman or governor). In Prague, their powers are executed by the city council and the mayor.

The regions are divided into seventy-six districts (okresy, singular okres) including three "statutory cities" (without Prague, which had special status). The districts lost most of their importance in 1999 in an administrative reform; they remain as territorial divisions and seats of various branches of state administration. A further reform in effect since January 2003 created 204 Municipalities with Extended Competence (obce s rozšířenou působností); also obce III. stupně – third-level municipalities, unofficially also called "little districts" (Czech: 'malé okresy') which took over most of the administration of the former district authorities. Some of these are further divided between Municipalities with Commissioned Local Authority (obce s pověřeným obecním úřadem, shortened to pověřená obec, pl. pověřené obce; "second-level municipalities"). In 2007 the borders of the districts were slightly adjusted, and 119 municipalities are now within different districts.

=== Denmark ===
For local government purposes, Denmark is divided into five regions (Danish: regioner), with their most important area of responsibility being the public health service. They are also responsible for employment policies, while some regions are responsible for public mass transit. Regions are not financial independent as they rely entirely on central state funding (around 70%) and funding coming from the municipalities (around 30%). Regions are led by directly elected councils (regionsråd) consisting of 41 members each.

The regions are further divided into 98 municipalities (kommuner). Elections for the municipalities are held on the third Tuesday of November every four years.

=== Estonia ===
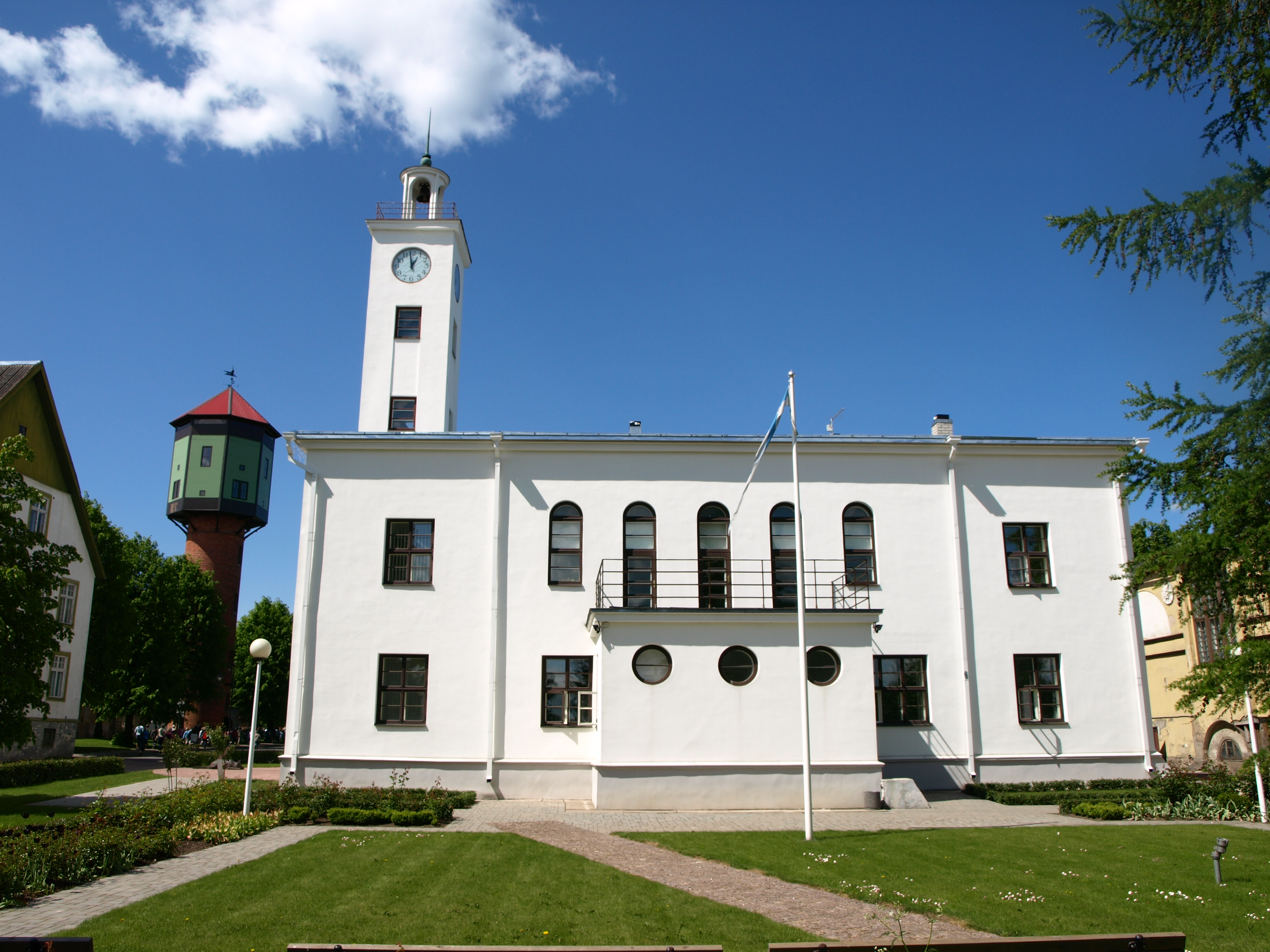
A town hall of Viljandi

Estonia is divided into 79 municipalities (omavalitsus), and each municipality is a unit of self-government with its representative and executive bodies. Furthermore, the country is also divided into fifteen counties (Estonian: maakonnad), each of which were used to be led by a county governor (maavanem), who represents the national government at the regional level. This although changed with 2017 administrative reform.

=== Finland ===
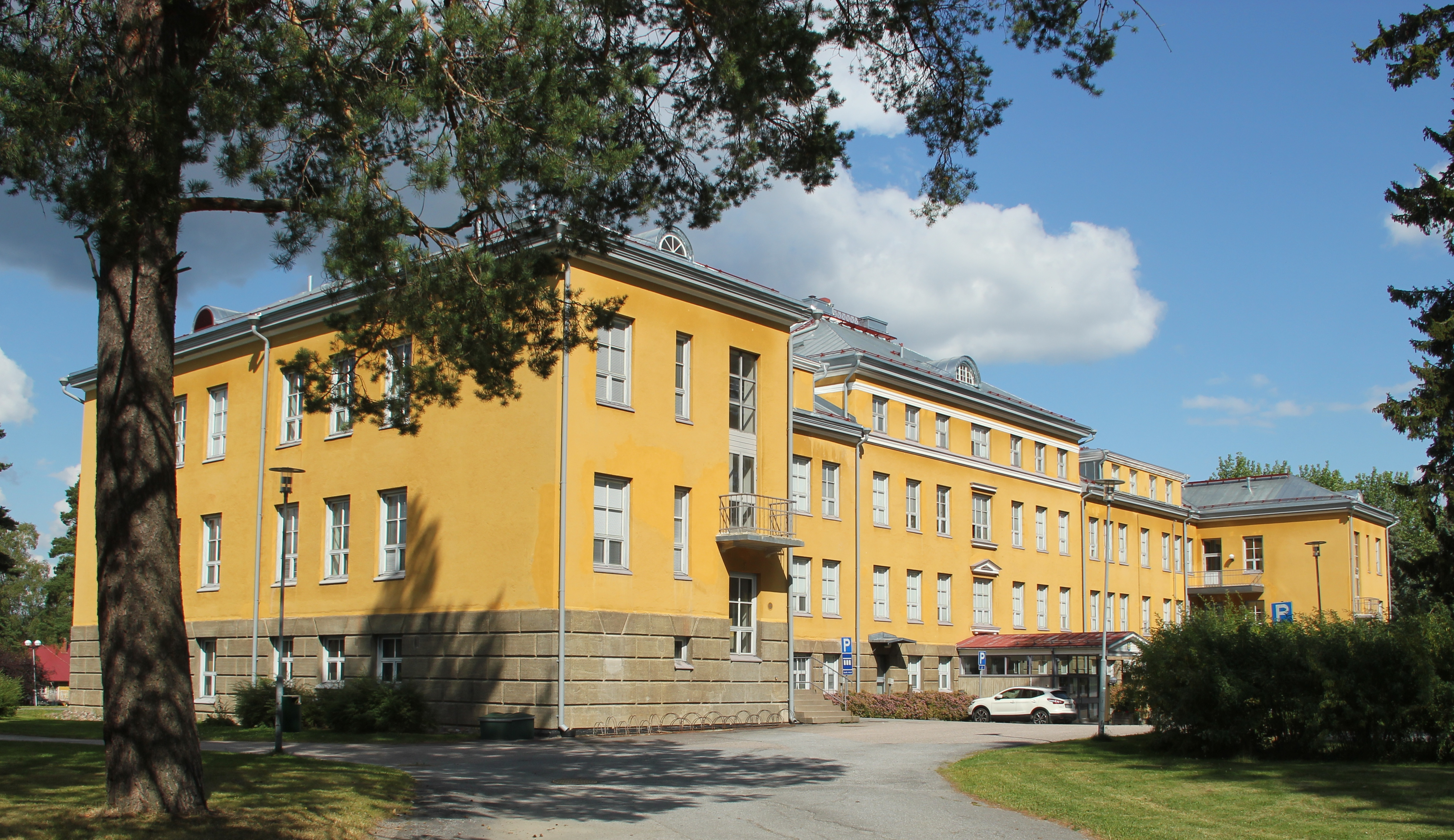
Sastamala Town Hall in Vammala, Sastamala, Finland

The most important administrative layer of local government in Finland are the 311 municipalities, which may also call themselves towns or cities. They account for half of public spending. Spending is financed by municipal income tax, property tax, state subsidies, and other revenue.

In addition to municipalities, there are two intermediate levels of local government. Municipalities co-operate in seventy-four sub-regions and nineteen regions. These are governed by the member municipalities and have only limited powers. However, the autonomous province of Åland has a directly elected regional council, and the Sami people have a semi-autonomous Sami Domicile Area in Lapland for issues on language and culture.

=== France ===
According to its Constitution of 1958, France has 3 levels of local government:

- 13 Régions (including Corsica) and 5 Régions d'outre-mer (Réunion, Martinique, Mayotte, Guadeloupe and French Guiana). Corsica is not referred to as a "région" but simply as a "collectivité territoriale", that merely means "local government area".
- 96 départements and 5 départements d'outre-mer (Réunion, Guadeloupe, Martinique, Mayotte and French Guiana). Paris is both a commune and a département.
- There are 36,679 municipalities (in French: Communes).

However, in addition to the constitutional clauses of 1958, there now exist specificities:

- Intercommunalities are now a level of government between municipalities and departments.
- There exist 2 "pays d'outre-mer": French Polynesia and New Caledonia. The expression "pays d'outre-mer" is convenient as it can be understood in French as both "overseas country" and "overseas county/traditional area" (as evidenced by Pays de la Loire that is a home région, not a home "country"). French Polynesia works as an autonomous région, whereas New Caledonia has a sui generis local government status with specific institutions and even more autonomy.

In spite of enormous differences in populations, each of the communes of the French Republic possesses a mayor (French: maire) and a municipal council (French: conseil municipal), which manage the commune from the mairie (city hall), with exactly the same powers no matter the size of the commune and council. This uniformity of status is a clear legacy of the French Revolution, which wanted to do away with the local idiosyncrasies and tremendous differences of status that existed in the kingdom of France. The size of a commune still matters, however, in two domains: French law determines the size of the municipal council according to the population of the commune; and the size of the population determines which voting process is used for the election of the municipal council.

=== Greece ===
Since January 1, 2011, Greece consists of thirteen regions subdivided into a total of 325 municipalities and communities. The regions have their own elected governors and regional councils, however there are seven decentralized administrations, which group from one to three regions under a government-appointed general secretary. There is also one autonomous area, Mount Athos.

=== Hungary ===
For local government, Hungary is divided into 19 counties. In addition, the capital (főváros), Budapest and the 25 Cities with county rights (megyei jogú városok) is independent of any county government. But all the county capitals are cities with county rights, except Pest county where Budapest is the capital of the county.

The local authorities of these cities have extended powers, but they belong to the territory of the respective county instead of being independent territorial units.

The counties are further subdivided into 198 districts (járások), and Budapest is its own 23 districts (kerületek).

=== Iceland ===
The Municipalities of Iceland are local administrative areas in Iceland that provide a number of services to their inhabitants such as kindergartens, elementary schools, waste management, social services, public housing, public transportation, services to senior citizens and handicapped people. They also govern zoning and can voluntarily take on additional functions if they have the budget for it. The autonomy of municipalities over their own matters is guaranteed by the constitution of Iceland.

The municipalities are governed by municipal councils which are directly elected every four years. The sizes of these councils vary from five members in the smallest municipalities to fifteen in the largest one. Most municipalities except for the very small ones hire an executive manager who may or may not be a member of the municipal council. These managers are usually referred to as mayors (bæjarstjóri / borgarstjóri) in the mostly urban municipalities but "commune manager" (sveitarstjóri) in the rural or mixed municipalities.

=== Ireland ===
The Republic of Ireland's local government is laid out by the Local Government Reform Act 2014. With a few exceptions, local government is two-tier. At the lowest level are the municipal, metropolitan or borough councils, which are elected during local elections. These councillors from the relevant county then together form the council, termed either County or City and County Councils. For example, the 4 municipal districts in Westmeath County each elect their own councils, who together form Westmeath County Council. Many functions are performed by the Chief Executive, who is appointed by the Minister for Local Government.

The exceptions to the above is the county of Dublin and the cities of Cork and Galway, the later two's councils are directly elected with no lower council. Dublin county is made up of four local area authorities, each elected directly. There are thirty-one local authorities.

The main sources of funding for local government in Ireland are local property and motor tax revenues, payments from the Exchequer, charges for goods and services, and state grants.

=== Italy ===
The Constitution of Italy defines three levels of local government:

- Regions: they were first acknowledged after the birth of the Italian republic in 1948. Numbering 20, they acquired a significant degree of autonomy after a constitutional reform was passed in 2001. Furthermore, 5 of them (namely Valle d'Aosta, Friuli-Venezia Giulia, Trentino-Alto Adige, Sardinia and Sicily) have a special status and are given even more power than the 15 others.
- Provinces: they were the only local bodies in effect during the Kingdom of Italy (from the unification of Italy in 1861 to the birth of the Republic in 1948). Consequently, they used to serve many functions, but these were reduced as Regions absorbed more and more competences. Nowadays they number 107 and mostly care to roads, school buildings, and local zoning and planning. Finally, from 2015 onwards, 14 provinces officially became metropolitan cities.
- Communes: The Mayor and staff, caring for the needs of a single town or of a village and neighbouring minor towns or villages.

Major cities also have an extra tier of local government named Circoscrizione di Decentramento Comunale or, in some cities (e.g. Rome) Municipio.

=== Latvia ===
Latvia is a unitary state, currently divided into 110 municipalities (Latvian: novadi) and 9 republican cities (Latvian: republikas pilsētas) with their own council.

=== Liechtenstein ===
Liechtenstein is divided into eleven municipalities (Gemeinden – singular Gemeinde), most consisting of only a single town.

=== Lithuania ===
Lithuania has a three-tier division of local government: the country is divided into 10 counties (Lithuanian: singular – apskritis, plural – apskritys) that are further subdivided into 60 municipalities (Lithuanian: singular – savivaldybė, plural – savivaldybės) which consist of over 500 elderships (Lithuanian: singular – seniūnija, plural – seniūnijos).

The counties are ruled by county governors (Lithuanian: apskrities viršininkas) appointed by the central government, and effectively oversee the two lower tiers of local government.

Municipalities are the most important administrative unit of local government. Each municipality has its own government and council, with elections taking place every four years. The mayor, who is a member of the council, is elected directly by the residents in a majority vote. The council appoints elders to govern the elderships.

Elderships, numbering over 500, are the smallest units of local government. They provide public services such as registering births and deaths and identifying individuals or families in need of welfare.

=== Malta ===
Malta is a unitary state divided into 68 municipalities (local councils), according to Chapter XA of the Constitution of Malta and the Local Councils Act.

=== Moldova ===
The Municipal Council in Moldova is the governing body in five municipalities: Chișinău, Bălți, Tiraspol and Bendery (also known as Tighina or Bender). The Municipal Council (Moldovan language: Consiliul municipal) serves as a consultative body with some powers of general policy determination. It is composed of a legally determined number of counsellors (for example 35 in Bălți) elected every four years, representing political parties and independent counsellors. Once elected, counsellors may form fractions inside of the Municipal Council.

=== Netherlands ===
The Netherlands has three tiers of government: national, provincial, municipal and water board.

==== Provincial ====
The Netherlands is divided into twelve provinces (provincie, pl. provincies). They form the tier of administration between the central government and the municipalities. Each province is governed by a provincial council, the States-Provincial (Provinciale Staten, abbr. to PS). Its members are elected every four years.

The day-to-day management of the province is in the hands of the provincial executive, the States Deputed (Gedeputeerde Staten, abbr. to GS). Members of the executive are chosen by the provincial council. The size of the executive varies from one province to another. In Flevoland, the smallest of the Dutch provinces, it has four members, while most other provinces have six or seven.

Meetings of the provincial executive are chaired by the King's Commissioner (Commissaris van de Koning(in), abbr. to CvdK). The King's Commissioner is not elected by the residents of the province, but appointed by the Crown (the King and government ministers). The appointment is for six years and may be extended by a second term. The King's Commissioner can be dismissed only by the Crown.

King's Commissioners play an important part in the appointment of municipal mayors. When a vacancy arises, the King's Commissioner first asks the municipal council for its views as to a successor, then writes to the Minister of the Interior recommending a candidate.

==== Municipal ====
Municipalities (gemeente, pl. gemeenten) form the lowest tier of government in the Netherlands, after the central government and the provinces. There are 342 of them (January 1, 2023), plus three special municipalities in the Dutch Caribbean. The municipal council (gemeenteraad) is the highest authority in the municipality. Its members are elected every four years. The role of the municipal council is comparable to that of the board of an organisation or institution. Its main job is to decide the municipality's broad policies and to oversee their implementation.

The day-to-day administration of the municipality is in the hands of the municipal executive (college van burgemeester en wethouders, abbr. to (college van) B&W), made up of the mayor (burgemeester) and the aldermen (wethouder, pl. wethouders). The executive implements national legislation on matters such as social assistance, unemployment benefits and environmental management. It also bears primary responsibility for the financial affairs of the municipality and for its personnel policies.

Aldermen are appointed by the council. Councillors can be chosen to act as aldermen, resulting in their council seats being taken over by other representatives of the same political parties. Non-councillors can also be appointed.

Unlike councillors and aldermen, mayors are not elected (not even indirectly), but are appointed by the Crown. Mayors chair both the municipal council and the executive. They have a number of statutory powers and responsibilities of their own. They are responsible for maintaining public order and safety within the municipality and frequently manage the municipality's public relations. As Crown appointees, mayors also have some responsibility for overseeing the work of the municipality, its policies and relations with other government bodies. Although they are obliged to carry out the decisions of the municipal council and executive, they may recommend that the Minister of the Interior quash any decision that they believe to be contrary to the law or against the public interest.

Mayors are invariably appointed for a period of six years. They can be dismissed only by the Crown and not by the municipal council.

==== Water boards ====
Water boards (waterschap and hoogheemraadschap, pl. waterschappen and hoogheemraadschappen) are among the oldest government authorities in the Netherlands. They literally form the foundation of the whole Dutch system of local government; from time immemorial they have shouldered the responsibility for water management for the residents of their area. In polders this mainly involves regulating the water level. It has always been in the common interest to keep water out and polder residents have always had to work together. That is what led to the creation of water boards.

The structure of the water boards varies, but they all have a general administrative body and an executive board (college van dijkgraaf en heemraden) consisting of a chairperson (dijkgraaf) and other members ((hoog)heemraad, pl. (hoog)heemraden). The chairperson also presides the general administrative body. This body consists of people representing the various categories of stakeholders: landholders, leaseholders, owners of buildings, companies and, since recently, all the residents as well. Importance and financial contribution decide how many representatives each category may delegate. Certain stakeholders (e.g. environmental organisations) may be given the power to appoint members.

The general administrative body elects the executive board from among its members. The government appoints the chairperson for a period of six years. The general administrative body is elected for a period of four years. They are elected as party representatives (before 2009, they were elected on an individual basis).

=== Norway ===
Norway had 357 municipalities of varying size in 2024, each administered by an elected municipal council. They are grouped into 15 counties (fylker), each governed by an elected county council.

Each county has a governor appointed by the central government, responsible for ensuring legality in their administration. The municipal sector is a provider of vital services to the Norwegian public, accounting for about 20% of Norwegian GNP and 24% of total employment. They have the right to tax and to use their resources to support education, libraries, social security, and public works such as streetcar lines, gas and electricity works, roads, and town planning, but they are usually aided in these activities by state funds.

Oslo is the only urban center that alone constitutes a county; the remaining 14 counties consist of both urban and rural areas. County and municipal councils are popularly elected every four years.

The municipal council (Norwegian: Kommunestyre; lit. 'municipal board') is the highest governing body of the municipality in Norway. Municipalities are the only unit of local government in Norway (in addition to the regional "county" level and the national level). The municipal council sets the scope of municipal activity, takes major decisions, and delegates responsibility. The council is led by a mayor, ordfører (Bokmål) or ordførar (Nynorsk), and is divided into an executive council (formannskap) and a number of committees, each responsible for a subsection of tasks. It is not uncommon for some members of the council to sit in the county councils too, but very rare that they also hold national office in the Storting or Government without taking a leave of absence from the municipal council.

The municipal council in Norway dates back the Formannskapsdistrikt law that went into effect on January 1, 1838. Historically, the council was known as a herredsstyre (Bokmål) or heradsstyre (Nynorsk) in rural municipalities and bystyre in urban/city municipalities. During the 1960s, the distinction between rural and urban municipalities was eliminated, however, many Norwegian cities still refer to their municipal council as a city council (bystyre).

=== Portugal ===
Currently, mainland Portugal is divided into 18 districts (in Portuguese, distritos). Each district takes the name of their respective capital city. Insular Portugal, comprising the two Atlantic archipelagos of the Azores and Madeira, is organized as two autonomous regions (in Portuguese, regiões autónomas).

Each district and each Autonomous region is divided into municipalities (in Portuguese, municípios) which, in turn, are subdivided into parishes (in Portuguese, freguesias).

Since 1976, when the two Autonomous regions of Portugal were established, the Azores and Madeira are no longer divided into districts.

=== Poland ===
Poland has three levels of subdivision. The Polish territory is divided into 16 voivodeships (provinces); these are further divided into 379 powiats (counties or districts), and these powiats are further divided into 2,479 gminas (communes or municipalities). Major cities normally have the status of both gmina and powiat.

Each voivodeship is jointly governed by the National-government appointed voivode and a locally elected sejmik (provincial assembly), which appoints an executive board led by a voivodeship marshal.

=== Russia ===
The Russian Federation constitutes eighty-five federal subjects that are constituent members of the Federation. All federal subjects are of equal federal rights in the sense that they have equal representation—two delegates each—in the Federation Council (upper house of the Federal Assembly). But they do differ in the degree of autonomy they enjoy. The constitution includes annexed Russian-occupied territories in dispute with Ukraine.

The modern administrative-territorial structures of the federal subjects vary significantly from one federal subject to another. While the implementation details may be considerably different, in general, however, the following types of high-level administrative divisions are recognized:

- administrative districts (raions)
- cities/towns and urban-type settlements of federal subject significance
- closed administrative-territorial formations

Typical lower-level administrative divisions include:

- selsoviets (rural councils)
- towns and urban-type settlements of the administrative district significance
- city districts

=== Slovenia ===
Slovenia has only one level of local self-government established: municipalities. The Constitution of the Republic of Slovenia provides also basis for establishing second level, regions, but they haven't been established yet (Article 143). There are two types of municipalities in Slovenia:

- urban municipalities (Art. 141 of the Constitution)
- (rural) municipalities (Art. 139 of the Constitution)

Slovenia signed (1994) and ratified (1996) European Charter of Local Self-Government without any reservations. The Charter is in force since March 1, 1997. The Congress of Local and Regional Authorities (Council of Europe) performed three monitorings (2001, 2011, and 2018).

=== Spain ===
Spain is divided into 17 autonomous communities, which in turn are divided into 50 provinces. There are also two autonomous cities: those of Ceuta and Melilla. Finally, each province comprises a number of municipalities.

Each administrative entity is given powers, structure, and boundaries by a law that was passed by the Prime Minister .

Law 7/1985, passed by the former Spanish Prime Minister Felipe González Márquez (socialist), lays down the procedure of the Local Government. Every city in Spain used this Law until 2003. This year, the former Spanish Prime Minister José María Aznar (conservative), passed a Law (57/2003) to modernize organic rules of those cities which had more than 250,000 inhabitants, and other important cities (like capital cities of provinces with at least 175,000 inhabitants). Also, it exists two other important Laws for specifically Madrid (Law 22/2006) and Barcelona (Law 1/2006). The main governing body in most municipalities is called Ayuntamiento (in the less populated municipalities an alternative local organization system called open council, "concejo abierto", is used). The Ayuntamiento in turn is formed by the Plenary (el Pleno, the collective formed by the city councillors) and the Mayor. The number of members that compose The Plenary varies depending on city's population (for example, since 2007 Valencia has 33 members and Pamplona has 27). The name given to the members of the Plenary is councillor (concejal). Those councillors are elected between city's inhabitants every four years by direct vote. After being elected, councillors meet in a special Plenary session to determine who will be elected, between them, as city's Mayor. In the next days after the election, the mayor chooses some councillors to set up the executive governing body (Junta de Gobierno or Comisión de Gobierno). After that, and for the next four years, city's mayor and the Junta de Gobierno will govern over the city according to their competences (urbanism, some taxes, local police, licenses for specific activities, cleaning services, etc.). Meanwhile, councillors in the Plenary but not part of the Junta de Gobierno (the opposition) will oversee Mayor's rule. The autonomous community of Catalonia is divided in 4 provinces and more than 900 municipalities. Between these two tiers, there are 41 comarques (singular, comarca), roughly equivalent to 'district' or 'county'. The comarca is a commonwealth, or union, of municipalities with competences in several fields (Law 6/1987 of the Parliament of Catalonia).

=== Sweden ===
Every fourth year general elections are held in Sweden to elect members of the national parliament, 20 county council assemblies and 290 municipal assemblies. As the parliament elects the national government, the local assemblies elect their executive committees and their boards. Members in local committees and boards are elected proportionally by the political parties in the assemblies, giving all the major parties representation. The parties usually cooperate well on the local levels.

The county councils (landsting) are responsible for health care and usually provide transportation.

The municipalities (kommuner) are responsible for:

- social services, childcare, preschool, elderly care
- primary and secondary education
- planning and building
- health protection, water, sewerage, refuse, emergency services

On a voluntary basis, the municipalities provide sports, culture, housing, energy as well as commercial service.

The activities are financed by income taxes. Swedes pay around 20% of their taxable income to the municipality and around 11% to the county council. (The national government is financed by VAT and payroll taxes and fees.)

=== Ukraine ===
In Ukraine, almost all cities have their City Council, and the mayors (usually elected by people) are the chairmen of them (e.g.: Kyiv City Council, Kharkiv City Council, Odesa City Council, Lviv City Council, Chernihiv City Council).

=== United Kingdom and dependencies ===
The system of local government is different in each of the four home nations of the UK. In total there are 426 local authorities in the UK. 346 of these are in England, 11 in Northern Ireland, 32 in Scotland and 22 are in Wales.

Apart from Britain and Northern Ireland, the United Kingdom has dependent territories classed as either British Overseas Territories (of which there are 14) or Crown Dependencies (of which there are 3, with Isle of Man outlined below). These are not classed as local government entities, are legally not part of the United Kingdom, and are legally self-governing territories with their own systems of local government.

In England and Wales, the Local Government Association (LGA) is the national membership body for local authorities. Its core membership is made up of 317 English councils and the 22 Welsh councils through the Welsh Local Government Association. Scotland and Northern Ireland also have analogues, outlined below.

Across the UK, the Association for Public Service Excellence (APSE) also works to assist local authorities to improve their frontline services. APSE works with more than 250 local authorities "to advise and share information and expertise on a broad range of frontline public services".

==== England ====
The most complex system is in England, the result of numerous reforms and reorganisation over the centuries. The top-level of sub-national administration within England until the end of March 2012 consisted of the nine regions. The regions were used by central government for various statistical purposes, and Government Offices for the English Regions and assorted other institutions including Regional Development Agencies. Regional Government Offices, Regional Development Agencies and Regional Ministers were all abolished by the Cameron ministry in 2010. Only the London region which is a sub-region compared to the other regions of England has a directly elected government. Only one regional referendum has been held to date to seek consent for the introduction of direct elections elsewhere — by John Prescott in the northeast of England — and this was initially rejected by the people of the North East in 2004.

The layers of elected local government vary. In different areas the highest tier of elected local government may be:

- counties, which may be
  - single-tier unitary authorities, or
  - divided into districts (also known as boroughs in some areas)
- districts, which are separate unitary authorities in some areas
- metropolitan districts (also called metropolitan boroughs) in some areas which are similar to unitary authorities, but have joint boards with other districts in the same metropolitan county
- Greater London, which is divided into 32 London boroughs and the City of London

In most areas there is a lower tier of government, civil parishes, with unlimited functions and powers under the 2011 Localism Act.

Most civil parishes are in rural areas, but if the parish is a town the parish council may be called a town council. In a few cases the parish is a city, and the parish council is called a city council.

Metropolitan counties, and a few non-metropolitan counties, no longer have elected councils or administrative functions, and their former functions are performed by districts. Such counties remain ceremonial counties.

==== Isle of Man ====
Local government on the Isle of Man, a Crown Dependency, is partly based on the ancient parishes. There are four types of local authorities: a borough corporation, town commissioners, village commissioners, and parish commissioners.

==== Northern Ireland ====
Since April 1, 2015 Northern Ireland is divided into 11 districts. Local government in Northern Ireland does not carry out the same range of functions as those in the rest of the United Kingdom.

The Northern Ireland Local Government Association exists to represent the interests of local government in Northern Ireland and has had a specific role in representing local government to the Northern Ireland Executive and the Northern Ireland Assembly. Its members are the 11 local authorities in Northern Ireland.

==== Scotland ====
Local government in Scotland is arranged on the lines of unitary authorities, with the nation divided into 32 council areas.

The Convention of Scottish Local Authorities (COSLA) is an umbrella organisation formed in 1975 to represent the views of Scotland's thirty-two councils to central government.

==== Wales ====
Wales has a uniform system of 22 unitary authorities, variously styled as county, county borough, city or city and county local authorities. There are also communities, equivalent to parishes.

== North America ==
=== Canada ===
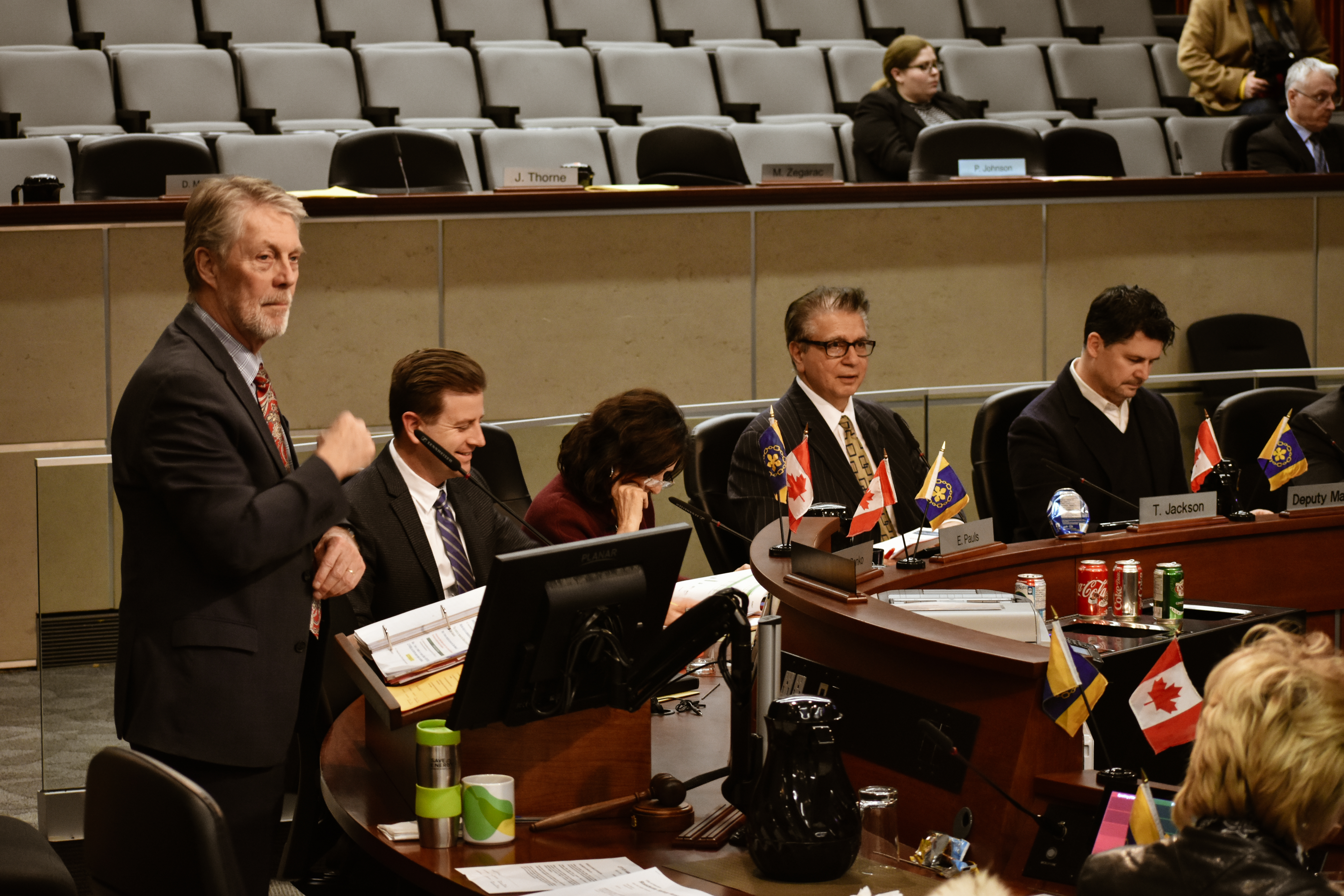
A meeting of the Hamilton City Council

In Canada's federal system, local government is the responsibility of provincial and territorial governments. The most prominent form of local government is the municipality, which is a locally elected authority with responsibility over a variety of services, such as roads, parks, fire protection, policing, planning, libraries, transit, and waste management. The exact responsibilities, powers, and governance of municipalities varies from province to province. In British Columbia, Ontario, and Quebec, municipalities operate on a two-tiered system, where lower-tier local municipalities administer some services, such as fire protection or parks, while upper-tier regional municipalities administer shared services, such as utilities, waste management, or policing. The remaining provinces and territories use a single-tier system of municipal government, where each municipality is legally independent of every other, although they may still voluntarily share services.

In addition to municipal government, some provinces maintain special purpose boards to govern police services, school districts, conservation authorities, or to provide certain municipal services to unincorporated areas that would not otherwise receive them.

The federal government regulates First Nations band governments, which deliver local services to Indigenous reserves in the country. Many band governments administer more than one reserve, and may participate in tribal councils, a form of voluntary regional organization for several band governments.

==== Ontario ====
Township councils in Ontario play a similar role as city councils in cities for smaller or low tier municipalities. Directly elected every four years, the number of councillors vary depending on the size of their municipalities. The councillors' powers and responsibilities are governed by the Municipal Act of Ontario.

==== Manitoba ====
Manitoba town council members serve primarily as a policy and direction board for the community. They consist of five to seven members with the head of council being the mayor or reeve.

=== Mexico ===
Mexico is a Federal Republic made up by 31 states and Mexico City. Each state is divided in municipios, while Mexico City is divided in sixteen demarcaciones territoriales (formerly called delegaciones). Twenty-nine states of Mexico were created as administrative divisions by the constitution of 1917, which grants them those powers not expressly vested in the federal government; Mexico's two remaining territories, Baja California Sur and Quintana Roo, achieved statehood on October 8, 1974, raising the total to 31. Each state has a constitution, a governor elected for six years, and a unicameral legislature, with representatives elected by district vote in proportion to population. An ordinary session of the legislature is held annually, and extraordinary sessions may be called by the governor or the permanent committee. Bills may be introduced by legislators, by the governor, by the state supreme court, and by municipalities (a unit comparable to a US county). In addition to the 31 states, there is also Mexico City, whose Head of Government serves as a member of the city's cabinet and its title is compared as a governor. Many state services are supported by federal subsidies.

The principal unit of state government is the municipality. Mexico's 2,378 municipalities are governed by municipal presidents and municipal councils. State governors generally select the nominees for the municipal elections. Municipal budgets are approved by the respective state governors. Until 1997, the president appointed the mayor of Mexico City. Political reforms allowed the first open elections in 1997, and Cuauhtémoc Cardenas Solórzano became Mexico City's first elected mayor.

=== United States ===
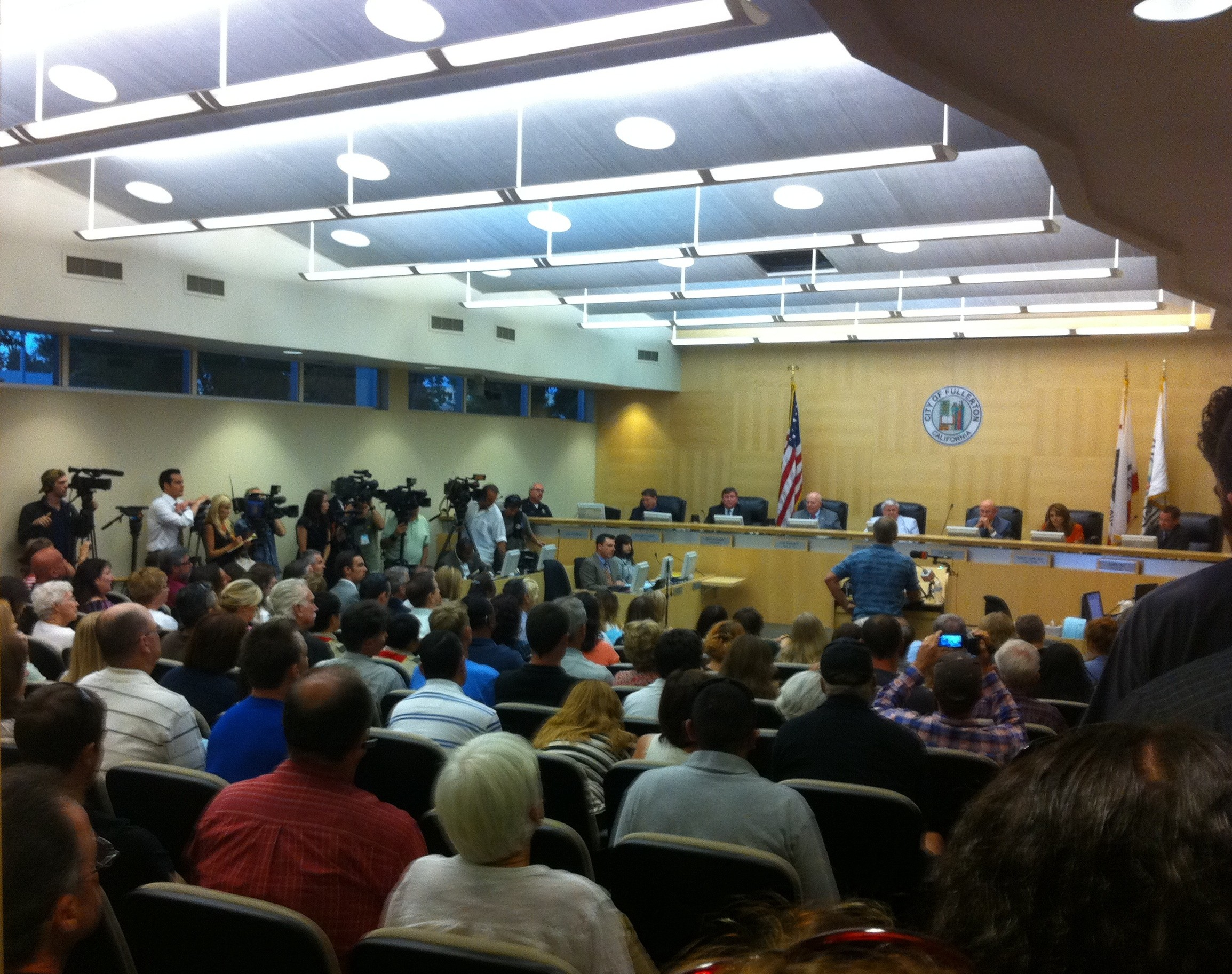
A city council meeting in Fullerton, California

Local government in the United States refers to governmental jurisdictions below the level of the state. Most states have at least two tiers of local government: counties and municipalities. In some states, counties are divided into townships. There are several different types of jurisdictions at the municipal level, including the city, town, parish, borough, village, reservations and boundaries. The types and nature of these municipal entities varies from state to state.

City councils and town boards generally consist of several (usually somewhere between 5 and 51) elected aldermen or councillors. In the United States, members of city councils are typically called council member, council man, council woman, councilman, or councilwoman, while in Canada they are typically called councillor.

In some cities, the mayor is a voting member of the council who serves as chairman; in others, the mayor is the city's independent chief executive (or strong mayor) with veto power over city council legislation. In larger cities the council may elect other executive positions as well, such as a council president and speaker.

The council generally functions as a parliamentary or presidential style legislative body, proposing bills, holding votes, and passing laws to help govern the city.

The role of the mayor in the council varies depending on whether or not the city uses council–manager government or mayor–council government, and by the nature of the statutory authority given to it by state law, city charter, or municipal ordinance.

There may also be a mayor pro tem councilmember. In cities where the council elects the mayor for one year at a time, the mayor pro tem is in line to become the mayor in the next year. In cities where the mayor is elected by the city's voters, the mayor pro tem serves as acting mayor in the absence of the mayor. This position is also known as vice mayor.

In some cities a different name for the municipal legislature is used. In Portland, Oregon, for example, it is known as the City Commission. In San Francisco, it is known as the Board of Supervisors; San Francisco is a consolidated city-county and the California constitution requires each county to have a Board of Supervisors.

Ohio constitution allows local home rule to define any type of government via a Charter Commission including a type with no Mayor (city manager) or potentially citizen's could vote to institute a pure democracy with no council

==== Indiana ====
Indiana town council members serve as both the executive and legislative branches for small communities incorporated as towns within the state. They consist of three or five members, depending upon the town's population.

Unlike some states, Indiana council members must declare a political party affiliation, if any, when they file to run for office. Upon election in November, they are sworn in before January 1 of the following year, where they serve a four-year term. There are no state term limits affecting how many times a candidate may run for re-election to office.

The first meeting after an election, members of the town council hold an organising meeting, where they elect a president to set future agendas and act as an official spokesman for the town or as liaison between the town and state and county government.

Indiana town councils work in conjunction with an elected town clerk, who manages the day-to-day business of the municipal government. As an elected official, the town clerk is solely executive in function and operates independently of the town council. But the council has final say on budgets which clerks depend upon to operate.

In addition to a clerk, the council can authorise the hiring of other staff to run the operations of government, including law enforcement officers, utility workers, park and recreation employees and town managers. These employees serve at the pleasure of the council.

==== Massachusetts ====
Town councils in Massachusetts are essentially city councils in towns which have adopted a city form of government but prefer to retain the "town of" in their names. In several communities which have adopted such a government, the official name of the community is "The City known as the Town of..." The legislative body of a legal town in Massachusetts is a town meeting; the executive board is a board of selectmen. In addition to having the structure of a city with a mayor and council, cities in Massachusetts can enact ordinances, while towns may adopt by-laws, which are subject to the approval of the Attorney General. City ordinances are presumed to be legal unless challenged and set aside in court.

==== Michigan ====
In Michigan, there are 257 incorporated villages that are governed by village councils, which is a form of weak–mayor administration. Michigan does not use "town" as a defined municipality, and villages are the lowest-level form of incorporated municipality. Villages are distinct from cities in that they share certain duties with their surrounding township and are not completely autonomous. Guidelines for village governments are defined in the General Law Village Act (Act 3) of 1895. Village councils consist of elected officials, including a village president, trustees, clerk, and treasurer.

==== New Hampshire ====
In New Hampshire, the Town Council is an elected body which serves as the legislative and executive body of the town. The town is governed by a charter, which is allowed under the home rule provision of the New Hampshire Constitution (Pt I, Art. 39) and Title III of the New Hampshire Revised Statutes Annotated. The charter for a Town Council must meet the following requirements of RSA 49-D:3 I. (a) – (e) and all other applicable laws. The basic notion of home rule in New Hampshire is that local communities are not allowed to supersede the authority specifically granted to them by the state.

==== Official Ballot Town Council ====
The Official Ballot Town Council is a variant form of the Town Council. In the Official Ballot form of government, the town council is vested with the limited authority to vote on all matters not voted on by official ballot. The authority and restrictions on the Official Ballot town council is the same as the Town Council, except with respect to those matters specified to be voted on by official ballot. Also, the council decides what is placed on the ballot, not the registered voters.

The charter of the Official Ballot Town Council is required by law to specify specifically:

- Which budgetary items to be included on the official ballot; and
- A finalisation process for the annual budget; and
- Process for public hearings, debate, discussion and amendment of questions to be placed on the official ballot; and
- Procedures for the transfer of funds among various departments, funds, accounts and agencies as may be necessary during the year; and
- Applicability of the official ballot procedure to special elections

The charter also must specify whether a 2/3 or 3/5 majority vote is required to approve bonds or notes, with the default being 2/3.

==== New Jersey ====
In New Jersey, under the Faulkner Act, municipalities have a variety of models of local government. The legislative branch follows the subdivision's style: city council, town council, borough council, township committee, or village council, except for Newark, New Jersey which has a municipal council.

==== Ohio ====
In Ohio, the default form of municipal government organization provides limitations on the legislative body of a statutory form of government. The Ohio Revised Code does not allow the local legislative authority (council) the power to review contracts nor perform administrative duties. No review of Contracts limiting the checks & balances in a statutory form of government. A charter form of government could provide the legislative body more administrative powers, change number of seats, or change required qualifications. The Ohio Constitution provides for local self-government powers via a charter as defined in Section 7 of Article XVIII reads as follows:

Any municipality may frame and adopt or amend a charter for its government and may, subject to the provisions of section 3 of this article, exercise thereunder all powers of local self-government.

Sections 8 and 9 of Article XVIII provide the procedures for adoption and amendment of a municipal charter.
The initial form of Municipal Government in Ohio is called Statuary because it is based on the default form outlined in the Ohio Revised Code statute Title 7 .
Ohio Revised code allows for a system with no Mayor and strong council, known as Section 705.51 | City manager plan.

The City of Kent, Ohio has a charter form of Government which:

Mayor shall be recognized as head of the City government for all ceremonial purposes, but shall have no administrative duties. (Amended 11-08-05)

==== Bicameralism ====
Bicameral city councils were common in the United States until the 20th century, when many were abolished for cost cutting purposes and replaced with unicameral legislatures. Typically, bicameral city councils were divided into Common Councils and Boards of Aldermen, to reflect the structure of federal and state legislatures. The city of Everett, Massachusetts was the last to abolish its own bicameral city council (a seven-member Board of Aldermen and an 18-member Common Council) and replace it with an 11-member City Council, doing so with a November 8, 2011 referendum which took effect in 2014.

Examples include:

- Philadelphia City Council was bicameral from 1789 to 1919, when it included a 149-member Common Council and 41-member Select Council, making it the largest municipal legislature in the United States.
- Worcester City Council – 11-member Board of Aldermen; 30-member Common Council (1848–1948)
- Seattle City Council – nine-member Board of Aldermen; 16-member House of Delegates (1890–1896)
- New York City Council – a quasi-bicameral arrangement of the New York City Board of Estimate and the City Council until the board's abolition in 1989
- Board of Aldermen of the City of St. Louis – from 1877 to 1915

== Central America ==
=== Belize ===
There are currently seven town councils in Belize. Each town council consists of a mayor and a number of councillors, who are directly elected in municipal elections every three years. Town councils in Belize are responsible for a range of functions, including street maintenance and lighting, drainage, refuse collection, public cemeteries, infrastructure, parks and playgrounds.

== Oceania ==
=== Australia ===
Local government is the third tier of government in Australia, after federal and state.

Because of the differences in legislation between the states, the exact definition of a city council varies. However, it is generally only those local government areas which have been specifically granted city status (usually on a basis of population) that are entitled to refer to themselves as cities. The official title is "Corporation of the City of ______" or similar.

Some of the urban areas of Australia are governed mostly by a single entity (e.g. Brisbane and other Queensland cities), while others may be controlled by a multitude of much smaller city councils. Also, some significant urban areas can be under the jurisdiction of otherwise rural local governments. Periodic re-alignments of boundaries attempt to rationalize these situations and adjust the deployment of assets and resources.

=== New Zealand ===
New Zealand has a local government system comprising two complementary sets of local authorities—regional councils and territorial authorities. There are 78 local authorities consisting of:

- 11 regional councils, which cover much of New Zealand's land area, and
- 67 territorial authorities (comprising 53 district councils, 12 city councils and 2 other councils).

Six of the territorial authorities are unitary authorities, which also have the powers of a regional council. They are Auckland Council, Nelson City Council, the Gisborne, Marlborough and Tasman district councils, and Chatham Islands Council.

Regional council areas are based on water catchment areas, whereas territorial authorities are based on community of interest and road access. Within a regional council area there are usually many city or district councils, although city and district councils can be in multiple regional council areas.

Local councils in New Zealand do vary in structure, but are overseen by the government department Local Government New Zealand. For many decades until the local government reforms of 1989, a borough with more than 20,000 people could be proclaimed a city. The boundaries of councils tended to follow the edge of the built-up area, so little distinction was made between the urban area and the local government area. New Zealand's local government structural arrangements were significantly reformed by the Local Government Commission in 1989 when approximately 700 councils and special purpose bodies were amalgamated to create 87 new local authorities. As a result, the term "city" began to take on two meanings. The word "city" came to be used in a less formal sense to describe major urban areas independent of local body boundaries. Gisborne, for example, adamantly described itself as the first city in the world to see the new millennium. Gisborne is administered by a district council, but its status as a city is not generally disputed. Under the current law, the minimum population for a new city is 50,000.

== South America ==
=== Argentina ===
Argentina is a federation of 23 provinces and the federal capital of Buenos Aires. During the 19th century there was a bitter struggle between Buenos Aires and the interior provinces, and there has long been an element of tension regarding the division of powers between the central government and provincial bodies. The federal government retains control over such matters as the regulation of commerce, customs collections, currency, civil or commercial codes, or the appointment of foreign agents. The provincial governors are elected every four years.

The constitutional "national intervention" and "state of siege" powers of the president have been invoked frequently. The first of these powers was designed to "guarantee the republican form of government in the provinces." Since the adoption of the 1853 constitution, the federal government has intervened over 200 times, mostly by presidential decree. Under this authority, provincial and municipal offices may be declared vacant, appointments annulled, and local elections supervised. Between 1966 and 1973, all local legislatures were dissolved, and provincial governors were appointed by the new president. A restoration of provincial and municipal government followed the return to constitutional government in 1973. After the March 1976 coup, the federal government again intervened to remove all provincial governors and impose direct military rule over all municipalities. Since 1983, representative local government has been in force again.

Until 1996, the President appointed the mayor of Buenos Aires, and by law, the president and Congress controlled any legislation that affected the city. Constitutional reforms that year led to an elected mayoral position, and a 60-member Legislatura (legislative council), which replaced the former city council.

=== Brazil ===
Brazil is a federation consisting of 27 federative units: 26 states and one Federal District. Government exists at three levels: federal, state, and municipal. The states are subdivided into 5,570 municipalities, while the Federal District has no municipalities (divided into administrative regions instead) and has powers of both a state and a municipality..

Municipal government consists of an executive branch headed by a mayor (Prefeito/Prefeita), and a legislative branch (Câmara Municipal), serving four-year terms. Municipalities are enshrined in the constitution of 1988 as entities of the federation; their responsibilities are distinct from the other two levels in theory, but overlap in practice (e.g. education, health, transportation). With their broad powers, municipalities may create their own constitutions, termed organic law, and cannot be overruled by state governments.

Elections at the municipal level follow a similar, partisan system to state and federal elections, but take place in different years. Municipalities may have anywhere from 9 to 55 members of the Câmara Municipal, depending on the population. There is no minimum or maximum population requirement for municipalities: while the average population of a municipality in 2005 was 30,099, Borá, São Paulo state (the least populous) had only 823 inhabitants, while São Paulo (the largest) had 10.9 million inhabitants. Municipalities within a state may choose to merge or separate with approval in a plebiscite and enacting of a state law.

=== Paraguay ===
Paraguay is divided into 17 departments, which are subdivided into districts, which, in turn, comprise municipalities (the minimum requirement for a municipality is 3,000 persons) and rural districts (partidos). A governor, elected by popular vote, runs each department. Municipal government is exercised through a municipal board, chosen by direct election, and an executive department. In the principal cities and capitals, the executive department is headed by a mayor appointed by the minister of the interior; in other localities, the mayor is appointed by the presidents of the municipal boards. Police chiefs are appointed by the central government.

=== Peru ===
Peru is divided into 25 regions and the province of Lima. Each region has an elected government composed of a president and council that serve four-year terms. These governments plan regional development, execute public investment projects, promote economic activities, and manage public property. The province of Lima is administered by a city council. The goal of devolving power to regional and municipal governments was among others to improve popular participation. NGOs played an important role in the decentralisation process and still influence local politics.

=== Uruguay ===
Uruguay's administrative subdivisions consisted of nineteen territories called departments and governed by intendencias, which were subordinate to the central government and responsible for local administration. They enforced national laws and administered the nation's social and educational policies and institutions within their territories. These territories had limited taxing powers, but they could borrow funds and acquire property. They also had the power to establish unpaid five-member local boards or town councils in municipalities other than the departmental capital if the population was large enough to warrant such a body.

Executive authority was vested in a governor (intendente), who administered the department, and in a thirty-one-member departmental board (junta departmental), which carried out legislative functions. These functions included approval of the departmental budget and judicial actions, such as impeachment proceedings against departmental officials, including the governor. At the municipal level, a mayor (intendente municipal) assumed executive and administrative duties, carrying out resolutions made by the local board (whose members were appointed on the basis of proportional representation of the political parties). The governor was required to comply with and enforce the constitution and the laws and to promulgate the decrees enacted by the departmental board. The governor was authorized to prepare the budget, submit it for approval to the departmental board, appoint the board's employees, and, if necessary, discipline or suspend them. The governor represented the department in its relations with the national government and other departmental governments and in the negotiation of contracts with public or private agencies.

Like the governor, the members of the departmental board and the mayor were elected for five-year terms in direct, popular elections. A governor could be reelected only once, and candidates for the post had to meet the same requirements as those for a senator, in addition to being a native of the department or a resident therein for at least three years before assuming office. Departmental board members had to be at least twenty-three years of age, native born (or a legal citizen for at least three years), and a native of the department (or a resident for at least three years).

The board sat in the capital city of each department and exercised jurisdiction throughout the entire territory of the department. It could issue decrees and resolutions that it deemed necessary either on the suggestion of the governor or on its own initiative. It could approve budgets, fix the amount of taxes, request the intervention of the Accounts Tribunal for advice concerning departmental finances or administration, and remove from office—at the request of the governor—members of nonelective local departmental boards. The board also supervised local public services; public health; and primary, secondary, preparatory, industrial, and artistic education. Although Montevideo was the smallest department in terms of area (divided into twenty-three geographic zones that generally coincided with the electoral zones), its departmental board had sixty-five members in 1990; all other departments had thirty-one-member boards and a five-member executive council appointed by the departmental board, with proportional representation from the principal political parties.

Data as of December 1990

== Others ==
- Rural council (disambiguation)
- Rural Municipality or Gaunpalika (Nepal)
- Village council (Palestinian Authority)

== See also ==
- County council
- Local election
- Local option
- Municipal corporation
- Petitions and E-petitions (can be submitted to city councils)
- Trustee (City Government-Village Board of Trustees)
