= Administrative division =

Territorial entity for administration purposes

Administrative divisions (also known as administrative units or administrative regions, as well as many similar generic terms) are geographical areas into which a particular independent sovereign state is divided. Such a unit usually has an administrative authority with the power to take administrative or policy decisions for its area. Administrative divisions are often used as polygons in geospatial analysis.

== Description ==
Usually, sovereign states have several levels of administrative division. Common names for the principal (largest) administrative divisions include: states (subnational states, rather than sovereign states), provinces, lands, oblasts and regions. These in turn are often subdivided into smaller administrative units known by names such as comarcas, raions or districts, which are further subdivided into municipalities, communes or communities constituting the smallest units of subdivision (the local governments). Some administrative division names (such as departments, cantons, prefectures, counties or governorates) can be used for principal, second-level, or third-level divisions.

The levels of administrative divisions and their structure largely varies by country (and sometimes within a single country). Usually the smaller the country is (by area or population), the fewer levels of administrative divisions it has. For example, Vatican City does not have any administrative subdivisions, and Monaco has only one level (both are city-states), while such countries as France and Pakistan have five levels each. The United States is composed of states, possessions, territories, and a federal district, each with varying numbers of subdivisions.

The principal administrative division of a country is sometimes called the "first-level (or first-order) administrative division" or "first administrative level". Its next subdivision might be called "second-level administrative division" or "second administrative level" and so on. An alternative terminology is provided by the Nomenclature of Territorial Units for Statistics which terms the principal division as the second level or NUTS-2.

Communities united in a federation under a federal government are more specifically known as federated states. A federated state may be referred to as a province, region, canton, land, governorate, oblast, emirate, or country. Administrative units that are not federated or confederated but enjoy a greater degree of autonomy or self-government than other territories within the same country can be considered autonomous regions or de facto constituent states of that country. This relationship is by some authors called a federacy or asymmetric federalism. An example is the autonomous republic of Karakalpakstan within Uzbekistan.

== Examples ==
World map showing first-level divisions for every country

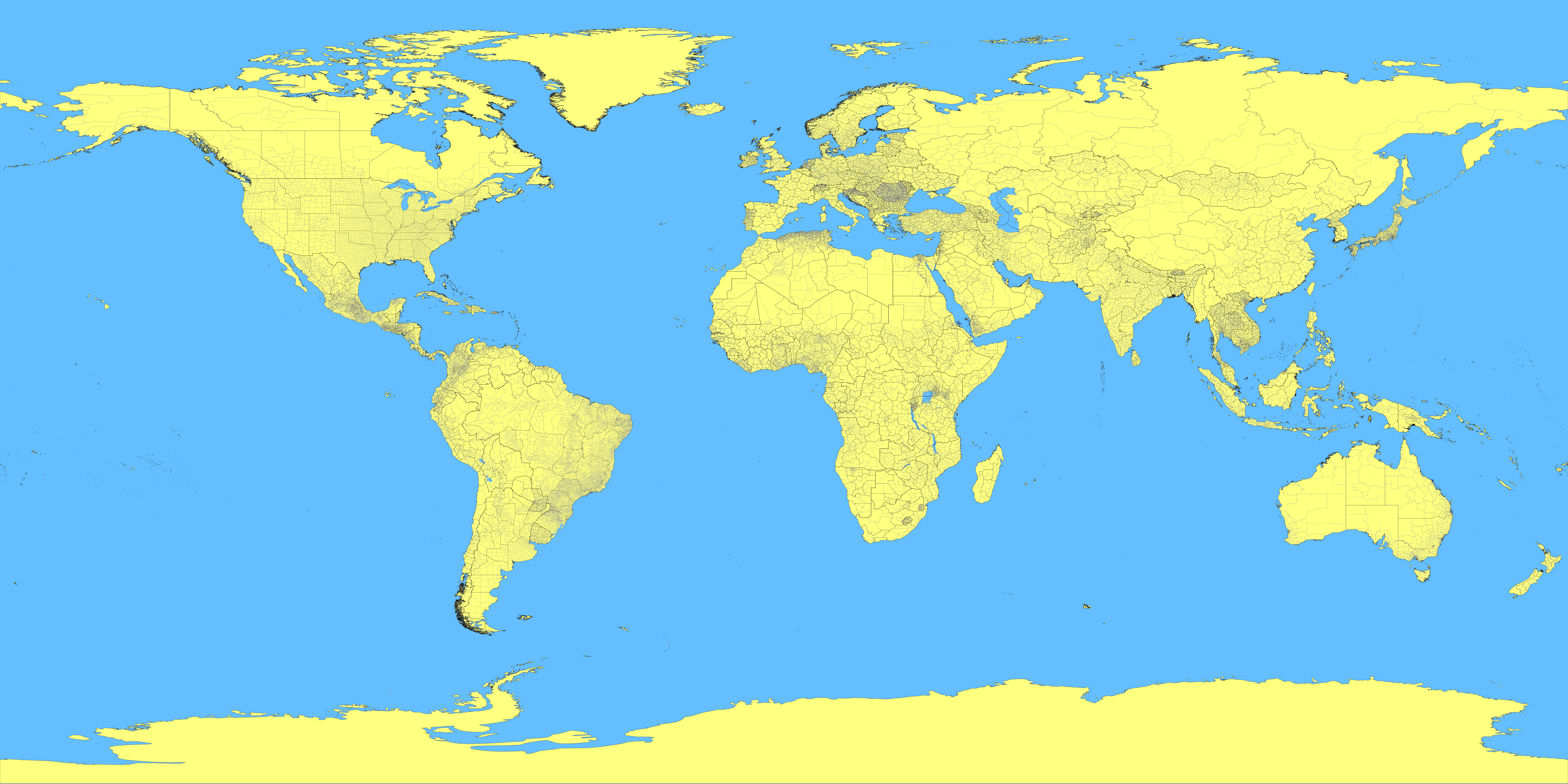
World map showing Global Administrative Unit Layers second-level subdivisions

=== Terminology ===
Due to variations in their use worldwide, consistency in the translation of terms from non-English to English is sometimes difficult to maintain. In many of the following terms originating from British cultural influence, areas of relatively low mean population density might bear a title of an entity one would expect to be either larger or smaller. There is no fixed rule, for "all politics is local" as is perhaps well demonstrated by their relative lack of systemic order.

In the realm of self-government, any of these can and does occur along a stretch of road—which for the most part is passing through rural, unsettled countryside. Since the terms are administrative political divisions of the local regional government, their exact relationship and definitions are subject to home rule considerations, tradition, as well as state statute law and local governmental (administrative) definition and control. In British cultural legacy, some territorial entities began with fairly expansive counties which encompass an appreciably large area, but were divided over time into a number of smaller entities.

Within those entities are the large and small cities or towns, which may or may not be the county seat. Some of the world's larger cities culturally, if not officially, span several counties, and those crossing state or provincial boundaries have much in common culturally as well, but are rarely incorporated within the same municipal government. Many sister cities share a water boundary, which quite often serves as a border of both cities and counties. For example, Cambridge and Boston, Massachusetts appear to the casual traveler as one large city, while locally they each are quite culturally different and occupy different counties.

==== List ====
- Amt
- Area
- Arrondissement
- Autonomous community
- Banner
- Barangay
- Barony
- Bailiwick
- Capital city
- Canton
- Cantref
- Circle
- County
- Community
- Constituency
- Department
- Diocese
- District
- Division
- Duchy
- Federal subject
- Governorate
- Hundred
- Kampong
- Kingdom
- Legal entity
- Local council
- Municipality
  - Regional
  - Regional county
  - Rural
- Oblast
- Okrug
- Parish
- Parts
- Prefecture
- Principality
- Province
- Public body
- Regency
- Region
- Raion
- Republic
- Riding
- Shire
- State
- Special administrative region
- Territory
- Theme
- Voivodeship

==== Urban or rural regions ====
General terms for these incorporated places include "municipality", "settlement", "locality", and "populated place".

- Borough, burgh or "boro"
- City
- Hamlet
- Local service district
- Shire
- Town
- Township
- Village
- Ward

==== Indigenous ====
- Tribe
- Indian reservation
- Indian reserve
- Band
- Ranchería

== See also ==
- GADM, a high-resolution database of country administrative areas
- ISO 3166-2, specifically Codes for the representation of names of countries and their subdivisions — Part 2
- List of administrative division name changes
- List of etymologies of administrative divisions
- List of administrative divisions by country
