= Yitzhak Yitzhaky =

Yitzhak Yitzhaky may refer to:

- Yitzhak Yitzhaky (politician born 1902), an Israeli politician who briefly served as a member of the Knesset for Mapam in 1955.
- Yitzhak Yitzhaky (politician born 1936), an Israeli politician who served as a member of the Knesset from 1977 until 1981.
