= Karmiel Dance Festival =

Yearly dance festival celebrated in Israel

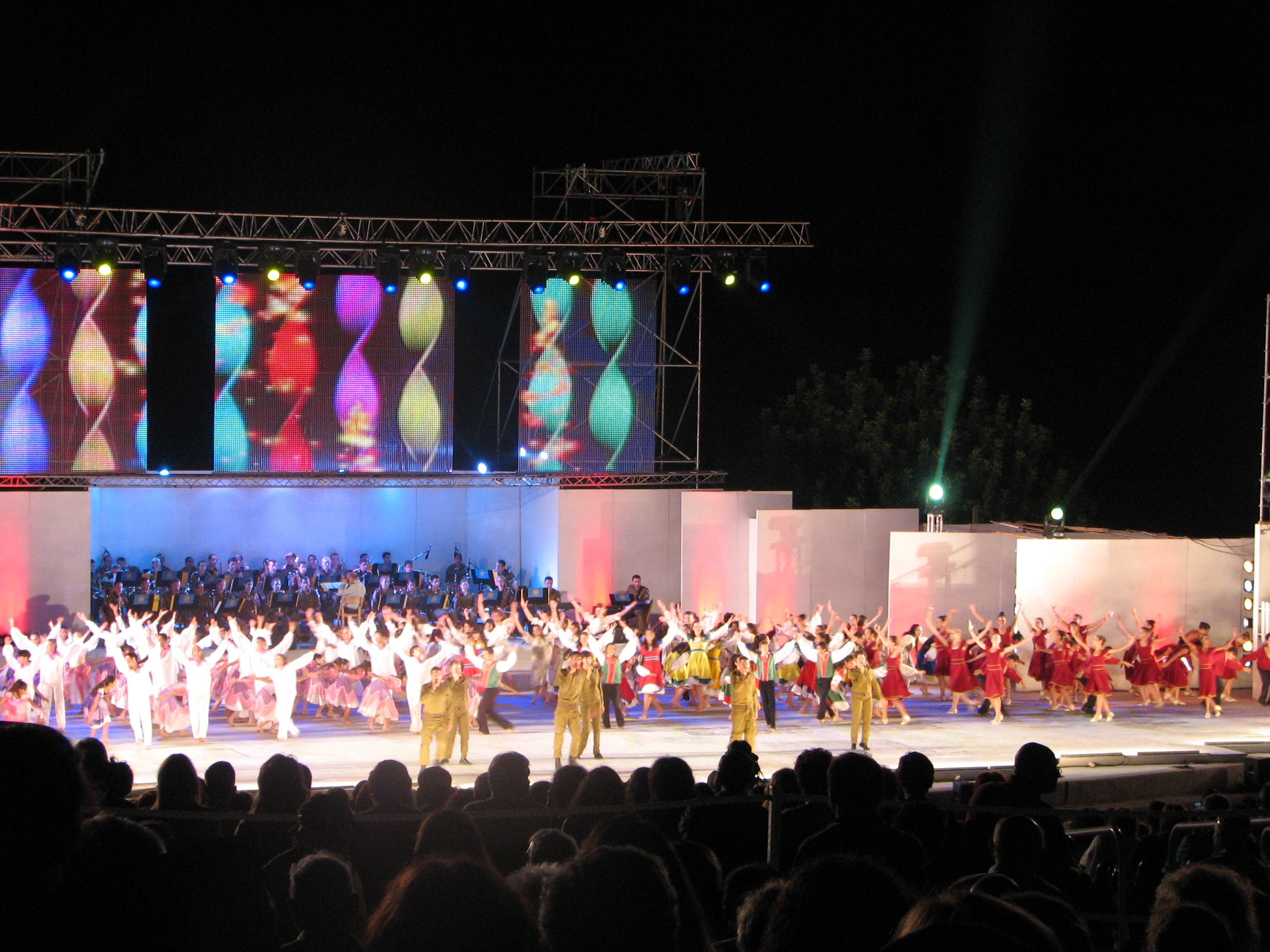
Karmiel Dance Festival, 2011

Karmiel Dance Festival is an annual dance festival in Israel.

== History ==
The Karmiel Dance Festival was inaugurated in 1987. It is held for 3 days and nights in July, and includes dance performances, workshops, and open dance sessions. The festival began as a celebration of Israeli folk dance, but today it features many different dance troupes, attracting dancers and spectators from Israel and overseas. During the festival there are two major competitions: a choreography competition and a folk dance competition. The festival is held in various venues in the city of Karmiel.

== See also ==
- Dance in Israel
- Culture in Israel
