= Karmiel =

City in Israel

Karmiel כרמיאל
- City

Hebrew transcription(s)
  - ISO 259: Karmiˀel
  - Translit.: Karmi'el
  - Also spelled: Carmiel (unofficial)
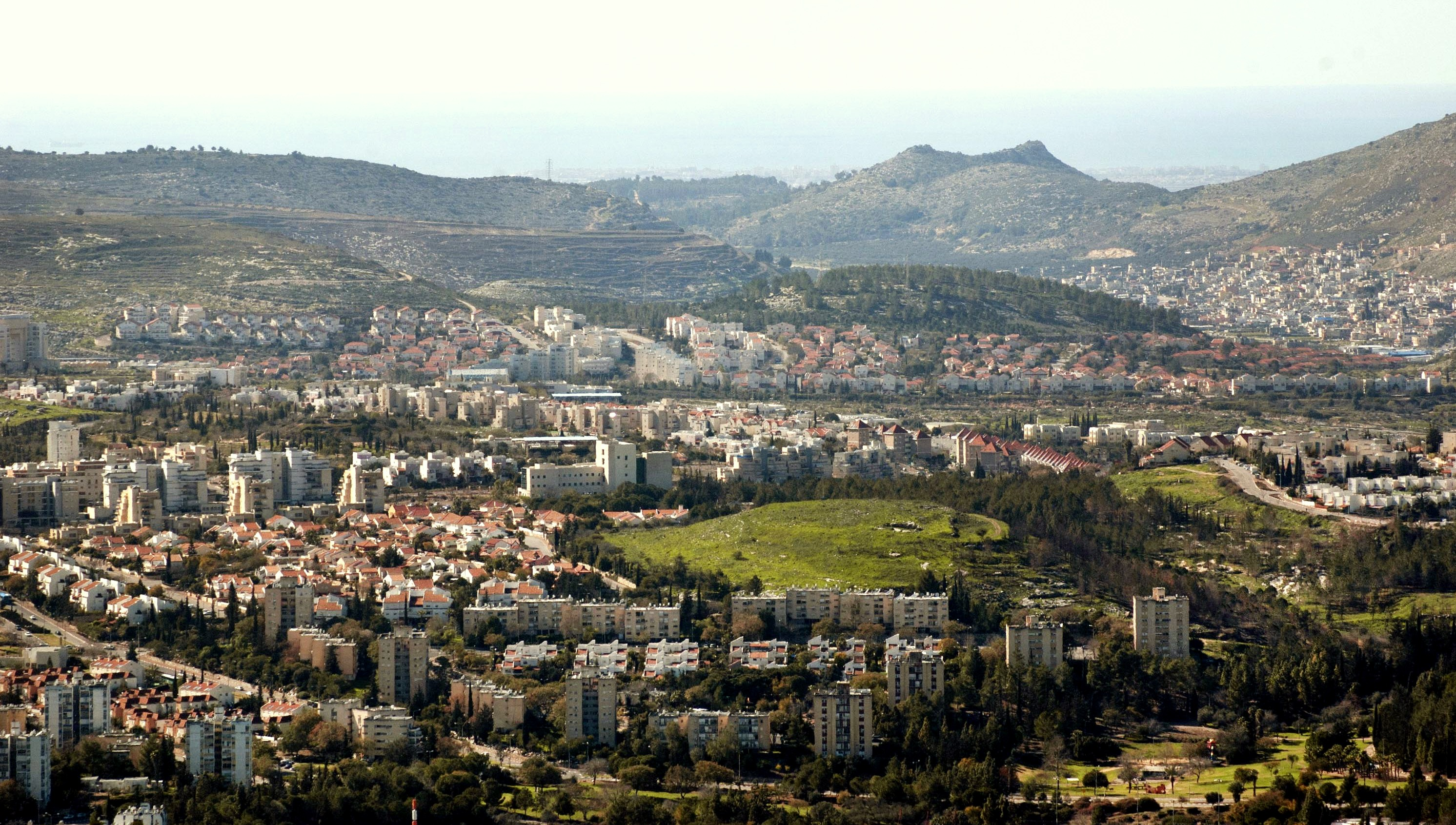
- View of Karmiel

- Flag Coat of arms

- Location within Northwest Israel Location within Israel
- Coordinates: 32°54′49″N 35°17′46″E
- Country: Israel
- District: Northern
- Subdistrict: Acre
- Natural Region: Karmiel
- Founded: 1964

Government
  - Mayor: Moshe Kuninski

Area
  - Total: 19,188 dunams (19.188 km^{2}; 7.409 sq mi)

Population (2024)
  - Total: 47,941
  - Density: 2,498.5/km^{2} (6,471.1/sq mi)

Ethnicity
  - Jews and others: 95.8%
  - Arabs: 4.2%
- Name meaning: God's vineyards
- Website: www.karmiel.muni.il

Karmiel (Hebrew: כרמיאל) is a city in the Northern District of Israel. Established in 1964 as a development town, Karmiel is located in the Beit HaKerem Valley which divides upper and lower Galilee. The city is located south of the Acre–Safed road, 32 kilometres (20 miles) from Safed and 20 km (12 miles) from Ma'alot-Tarshiha and 20 km (12 mi) from Acre. In 2024 Karmiel had a population of 47,941.

== History ==
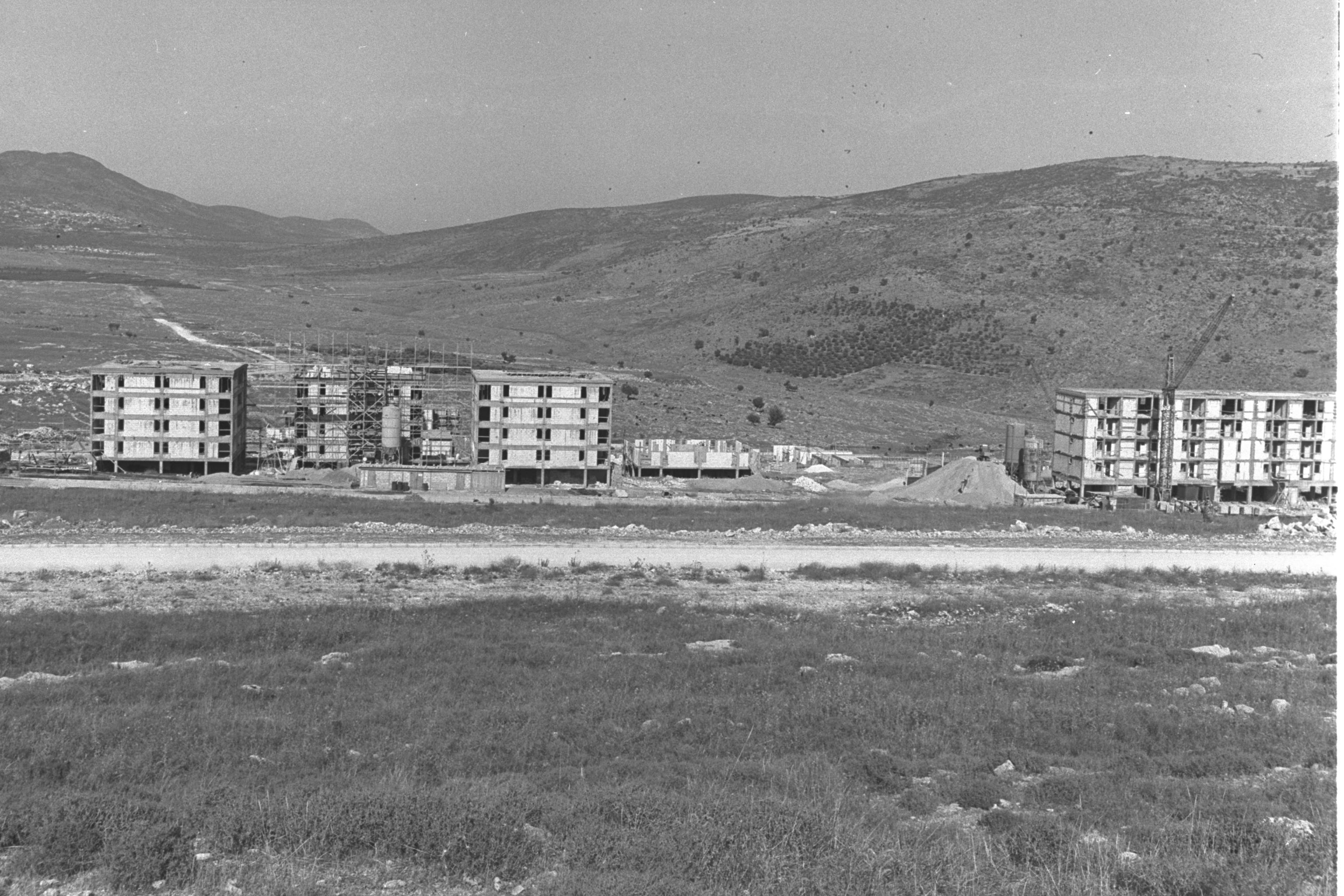
The first housing units under construction, 1964

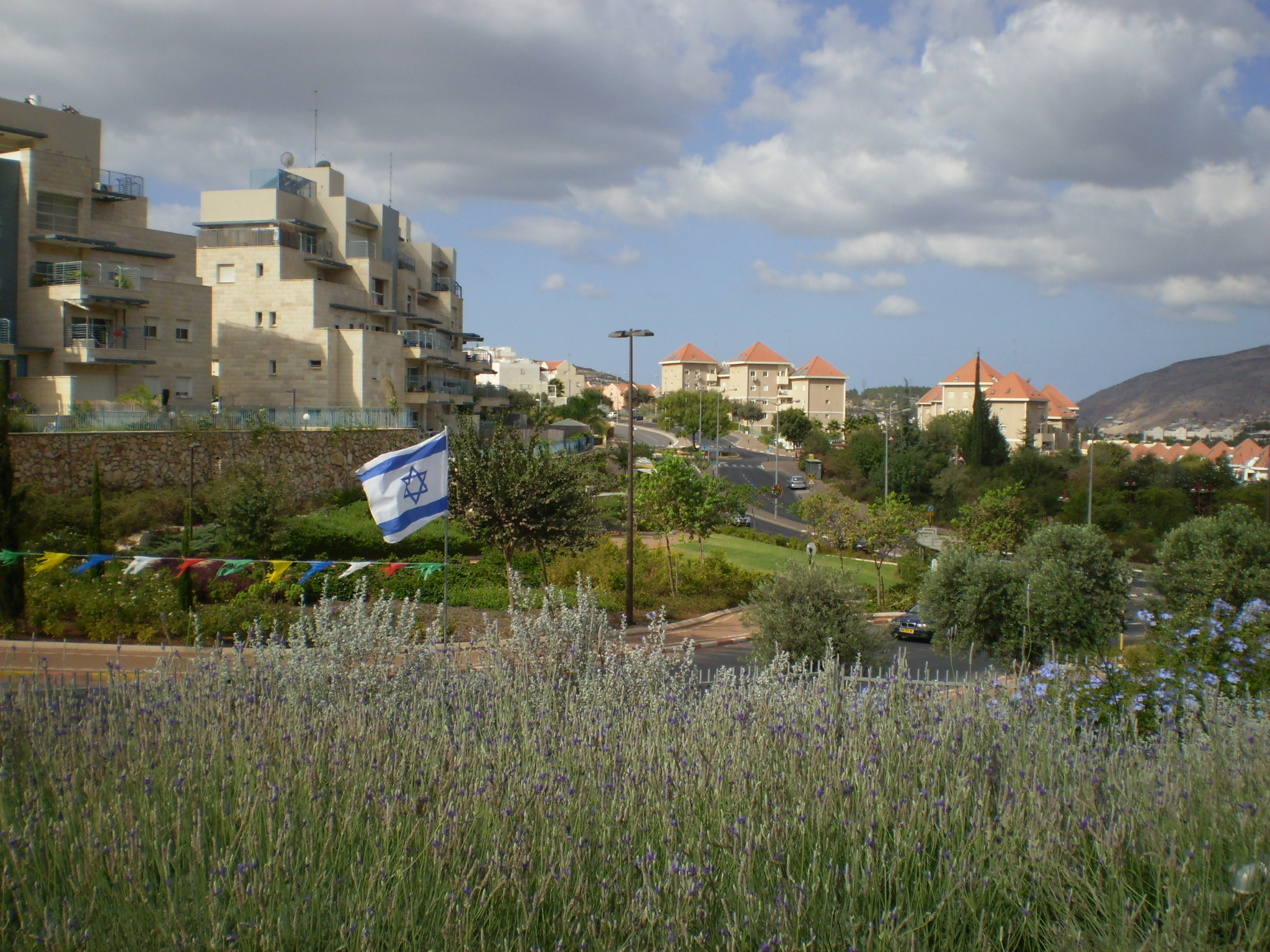
Galil Quarter

In 1956, about 1,275 acres (5.16 km^{2}) of land in the area that is now Karmiel, owned by residents of the nearby Israeli Arab villages of Deir al-Asad, Bi'ina and Nahf, were declared "closed areas" by Israeli authorities. This area, near the main road between Acre and Safed, had been an important marble quarrying site. In 1961, the Israeli authorities expropriated the land to build Karmiel. The villagers were offered "equally good land" in the area, but when Moshe Sneh (Maki) and Yusef Khamis (Mapam) brought the case to the Knesset on behalf of the villagers, the Knesset established that there was no such land. According to the Haredi newspaper She'arim, about 10 square kilometres (3.9 mi^{2}) (394 lots) were confiscated by a court order on 4 March 1963, at the request of the Israel Development Authority. However, the land was rocky, uninhabited and unfit for agriculture.

In 1964, when local Arabs applied for permission to move into the town, Minister of Housing Yosef Almogi replied that "Karmiel was not built to solve the problems for the people in the surrounding area." In February 1965, 400 protesters marched from Tel Aviv to protest against "discrimination of a group of our citizens". Representatives went to a local police station, informing the police that they were staying in the area without permission. Eventually, the perceived leaders were arrested and tried before a military tribunal.

Karmiel was one of the first cities in Israel to be established according to an urban master plan. It was built as part of the Central Galilee Development Project. Work began in 1963, and the official inauguration ceremony took place in October 1964. The first 16 families moved in at that time. A tender for the construction of Karmiel's main roads was issued in 1963, and Mekorot built a water pipe network connecting Karmiel, Rameh, Sha'ab and other nearby villages. In 1972, Karmiel was granted development town status, which bolstered its growth due to government-provided economic incentives to attract young couples.

In 1981, Karmiel was awarded the Beautiful Israel prize and the Kaplan Prize for Management and Services. Karmiel achieved city status on November 20, 1986. The first mayor was Baruch Venger, followed by Adi Eldar, who has remained in this position until Moshe Kuninsky took his place in 2018.

18,000 new immigrants settled in Karmiel between 1990 and 2002. And in the 2000s, some SLA families were resettled in Karmiel following the Israeli withdrawal from South Lebanon.

During the Second Lebanon War in 2006, Hezbollah fired 180 Katyusha rockets into Karmiel and the neighboring villages, leading to casualties and damage to buildings, roads, and cars.

== Geography ==
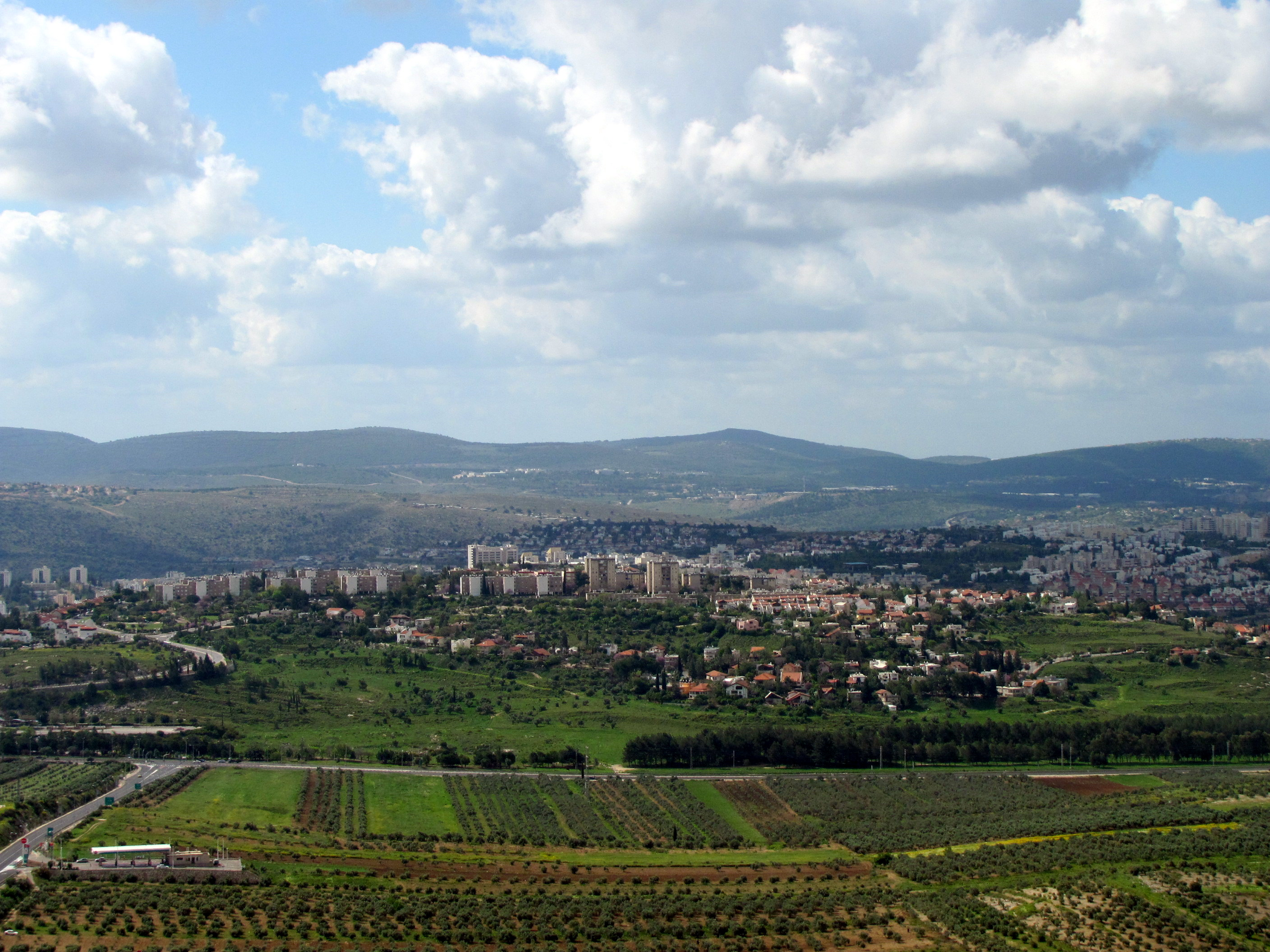
View of Karmiel

Karmiel is located on the Acre–Safed road, on the northern edge of the Lower Galilee. It lies in the Beit HaKerem Valley and its elevation is 330 m (1,082.68 ft). The Hilazon Stream passes slightly to the south of Karmiel. Its tributaries, the Shezor and Shagor Streams pass through Karmiel on the east and north, respectively. Karmiel sits on the Shagor mountain range, which stretches from Mount Hazon in the east (584 m (1,916.01 ft), next to Maghar) to Mount Gilon in the west (367 m (1,204.07 ft), at Gilon). Western Karmiel was built on the Karmi (362 m) and Makosh (315 m) mountains. Work on a new railway line linking Haifa and Karmiel began in 2011 and opened in 2017.

== Demographics ==
Historical population
Year	Pop.	±%
1972	4,000	—
1983	15,500	+287.5%
1995	33,200	+114.2%
2008	44,200	+33.1%
2022	47,450	+7.4%
2024	47,941	+1.0%

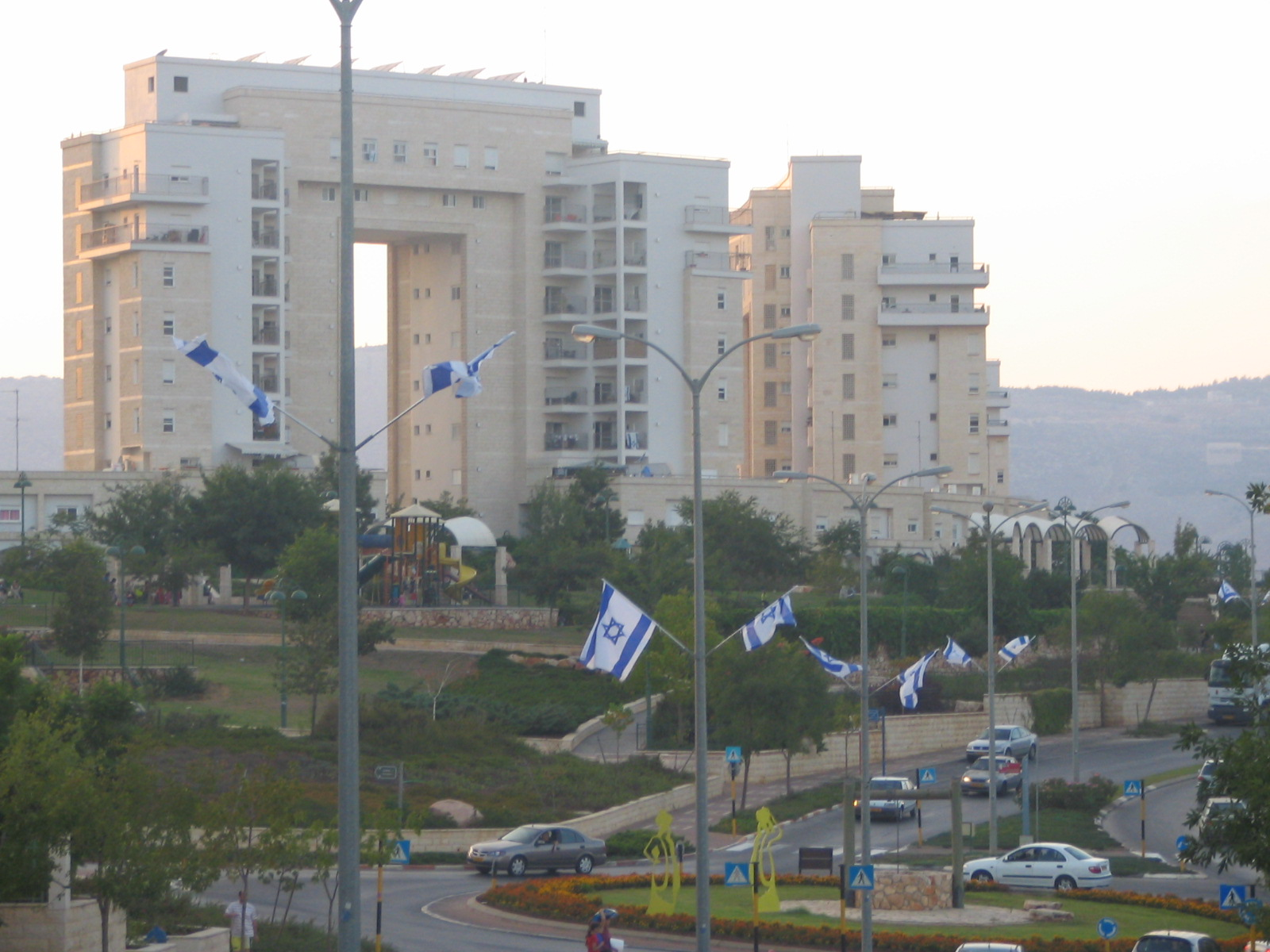
Ramat Rabin neighborhood

As of 2007, the city encompasses an area of about 24 km^{2} with a population of about 50,000 residents, approximately 40% of whom are immigrants from 75 countries. The city also receives significant internal migration of Haredi families. Since 1990, 16,000 immigrants have arrived in Karmiel, the majority of whom are from the former Soviet Union. According to the national master plan, by 2020 Karmiel will have a population of approximately 120,000 residents. Since 1980, six new neighborhoods have been developed and populated. A technical college has been serving the community since 1989. As of 2016, work is underway to create a further neighborhood on Mount Karmi on Karmiel's western fringe. In 2022 Karmiel had a population of 47,317, of which 77.6% were Jewish, 2.8% were Muslim, 0.8% were Christian, 0.5% were Druze and 18.3% of the population was counted as other.

=== Integration of Russian-speakers ===
"Nitzotz-Machanaiym" is a Religious Zionist community center which caters to the Russian-speaking population of Karmiel. It is one of a number of similar centers in Israel which operate in the framework of the Machanaiym "Communities" project. Rabbi Eli Talberg is the director of Natzotz-Machanyim, which is located on the first floor of "Kikar Ha'Ir" (often called "The Old Mall"). Activities include a beit midrash, conversion classes, Hebrew classes, a youth club, a women's club, and additional workshops and activities for all ages. The community also organizes regular educational tours throughout Israel and participates in sporting and social events with other branches of the Communities project.

=== Arab residents ===
According to The Times of Israel, as of 2020, Israeli Arabs "...now constitute around six percent of Karmiel's population - around 2,760 people..." The Israel Democracy Institute report of 2018, as quoted in The Times of Israel, suggests Karmiel is one of a number of cities 'in the process of being mixed', and reflects the upward mobility of some Arab Israelis, who seek to move into predominantly Jewish towns and cities, which do not suffer from a lack of government planning and construction.

== Local government ==
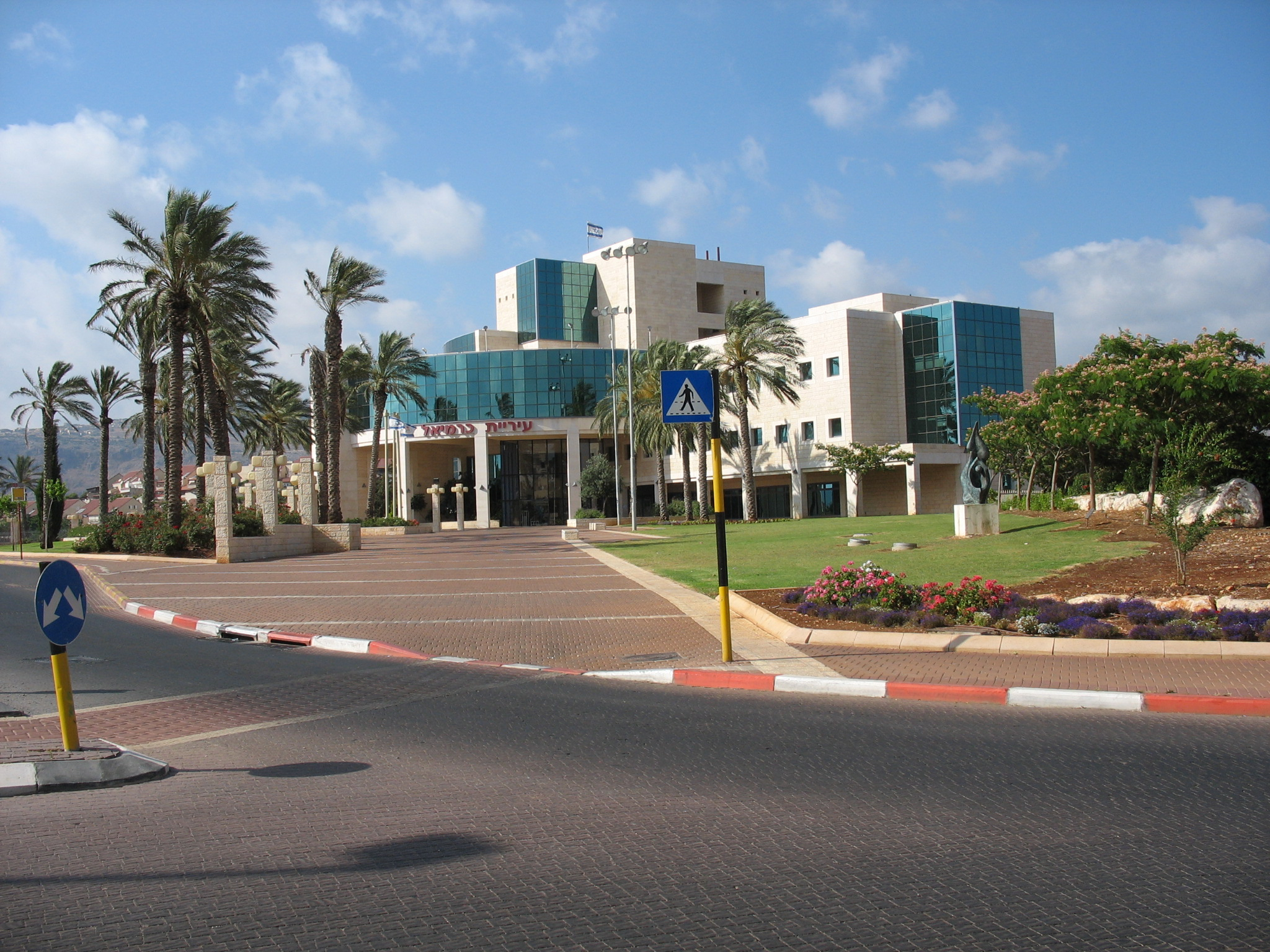
Karmiel City Hall

The local government is the Municipality of Karmiel, which is responsible for all the municipal matters regarding the City. Adam Tal was the first official head of the group that founded Karmiel in 1964. Avraham Argov replaced him and was himself replaced in 1968 by Baruch Venger, who headed the municipality of Karmiel until his death in office on November 22, 1988. His successor was Adi Eldar, who was re-elected several times. In November 2018, Moshe Kuninsky was elected Mayor of Karmiel.

== Education ==
Karmiel has four high schools, four junior high schools, a vocational training center, nine state-run elementary schools, one state-run religious school (including high school), an independent education elementary school, a school for gifted children and an educational farm, many kindergartens, nursery schools and daycare centers, as well as a network of community youth and sports centers and the international ORT Braude College of Engineering with a student body of 3,500 studying computers, electronics, industrial administration, biotechnology and other subjects. A biotechnology research and development center will also open at the college. However, despite a gradual increase in the Arab-Israeli population of Karmiel (c. six percent as of 2020), there is no Arabic-speaking school.

In November 2020, Krayot Magistrate's Court dismissed a lawsuit brought by Attorney Nizar Bakri on behalf of his two Arab Israeli nephews, alleging their right to education in Karmiel had been infringed by the municipality's failure to provide transport to and from Arabic-language schools outside the town. In his ruling the judge said that Karmiel was a Jewish city and Arabic-language schools could change its demographic balance and character. This ruling was based on Basic Law: Israel as the Nation-State of the Jewish People, which states that "the right to exercise national self-determination in the State of Israel is unique to the Jewish people." Critics say the law constitutionally enshrines Jewish supremacy and ethno-religious discrimination in Israel's Basic Law and relegates the Arab minority to an inferior status.

== Health care ==
In 2011, a Terem emergency care clinic was opened in Karmiel. The clinic is under the medical management of Dr. Walid Assadi and is open seven days a week, including Sabbath and holidays. Israel's four national health funds all maintain clinics in the city. In addition, Karmiel has dental clinics, general clinics, and private clinics.

== Culture ==
=== Dance festival ===
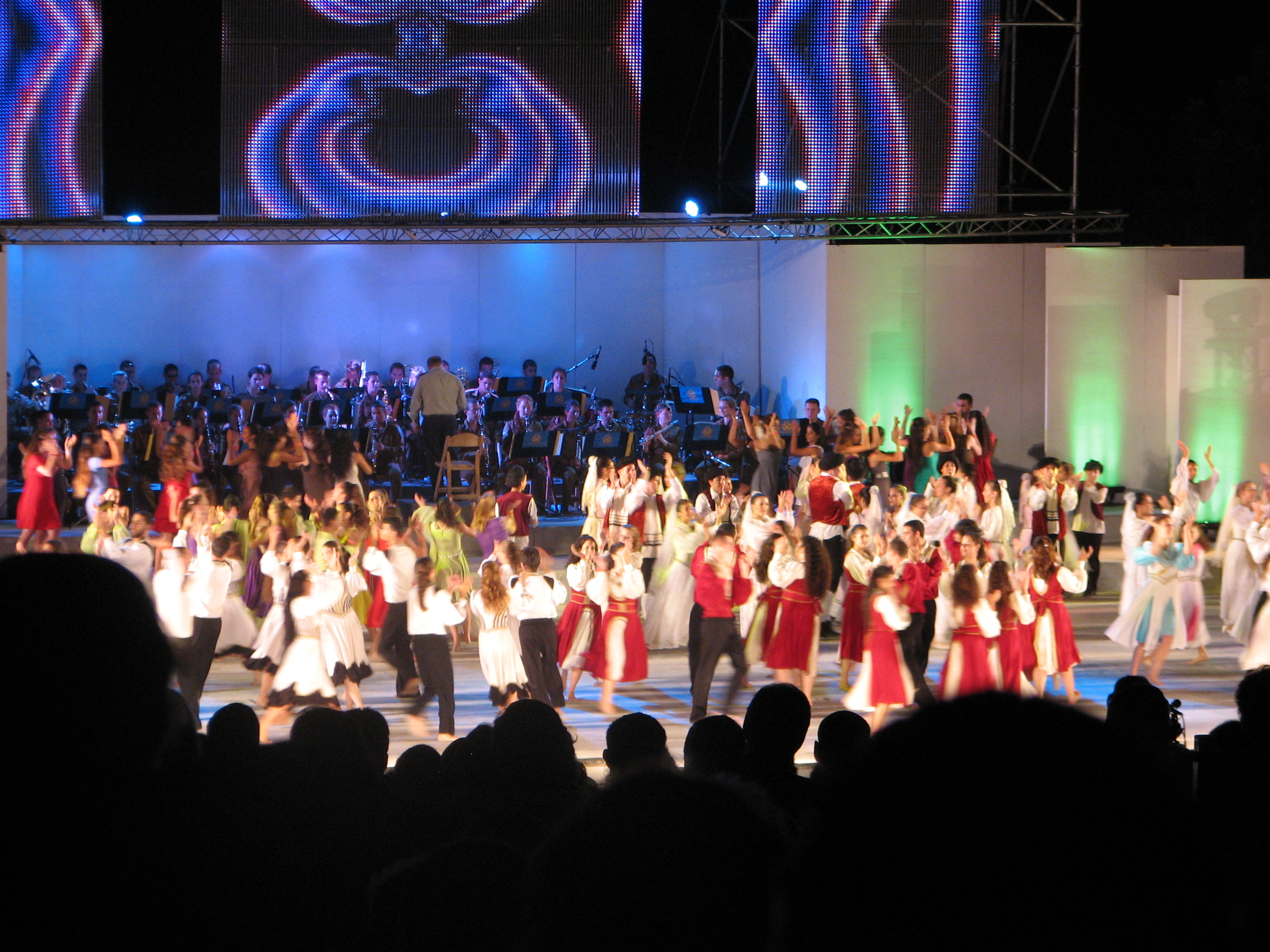
Karmiel Dance Festival

The city is known for the Karmiel Dance Festival, a yearly event since 1988. The festival is usually held for 3 days and nights in July, and includes dance performances, workshops, and open dance sessions. The festival began as a celebration of Israeli folk dance, but today it features many different dance forms from all around the globe, and attracts thousands of dancers and hundreds of thousands of spectators from many countries.

=== Beer festival ===
Karmiel used to host a yearly beer festival event, which included music and food, and was usually held in October. The 5th and last festival was held in 2019, being cancelled the next year and not renewed due to the COVID-19 pandemic.

== Environmental protection ==
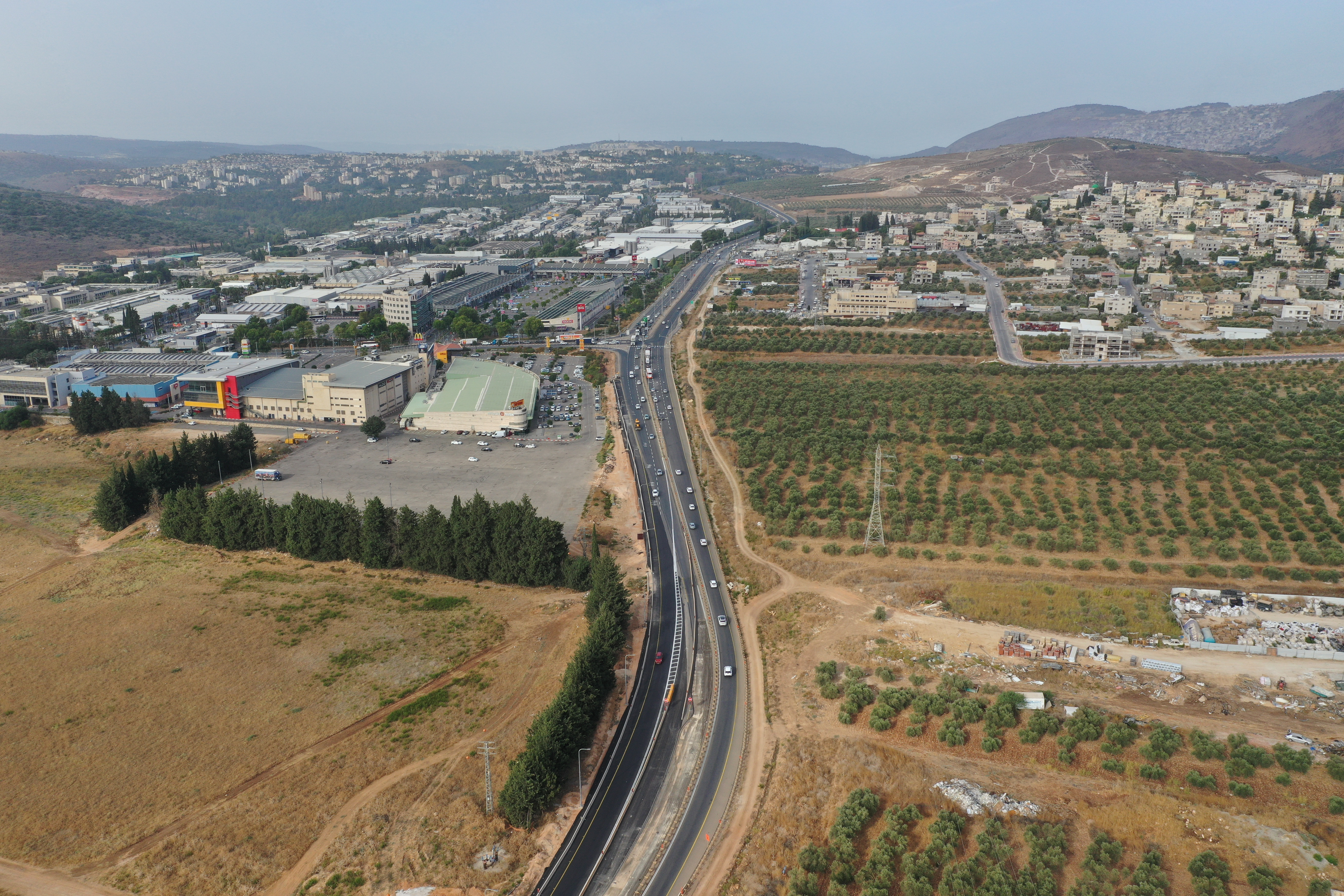
Karmiel Industrial area

Karmiel was the first Israeli city to receive ISO 9002 certification for the quality of its services. It is one of the few Israeli cities with ISO 1410 certification for environmental standards.

Karmiel has enacted by-laws to protect the environment and prevent pollution, and become a center for clean industries and advanced technology enterprises that abide by these standards.

== Parks and gardens ==
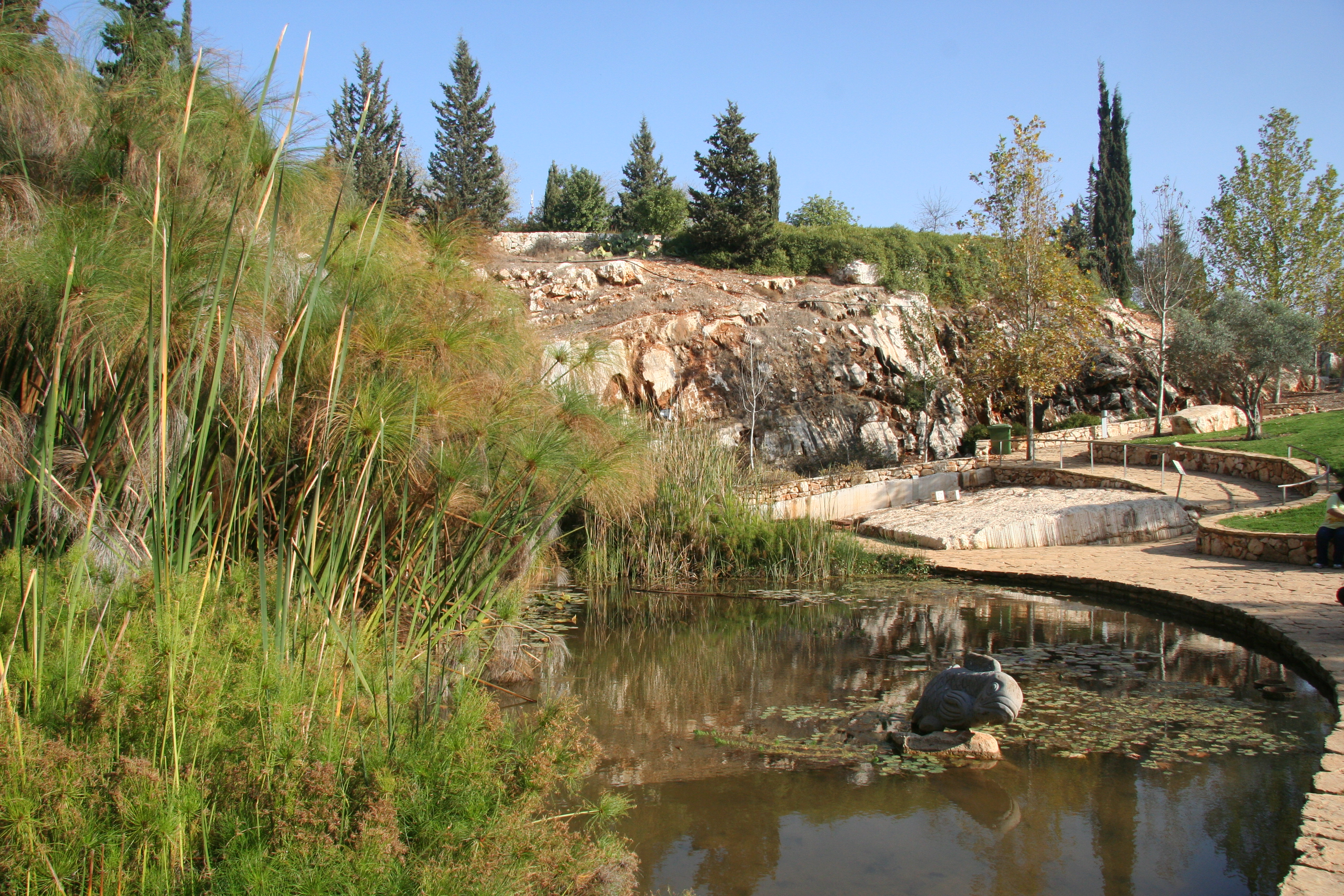
Karmiel Quarries Park

The Holocaust Memorial Park is located at the entrance to the city. The bronze sculptures were made by Jewish sculptor and artist Nicky Imber (1920-1996). The sculptures are separated into three groups: Holocaust, wondering and hope; which represent the story of the Jewish people from the time of the Holocaust to the return to the holy land.

The Karmiel Quarries Park is a 12.4-acre park developed on the site of a defunct limestone quarry. One section of the park is a sculpture garden. An amphitheater on the grounds of the park hosts local events and incorporates a drainage system that collects rainfall which is later used for watering greenery.

== Voting Patterns ==
In the 2022 election, 51 percent of voters in Karmiel voted for the parties of the center-left coalition led by Yair Lapid, while 44 percent voted for the parties of the right-wing coalition led by Benjamin Netanyahu and 2 percent voted for the Arab parties.

In the 2026 election, 50 percent of voters in Karmiel voted for the parties of the center-left coalition led by Gadi Eisenkot, while 41 percent voted for the parties of the right-wing coalition led by Benjamin Netanyahu and 3 percent voted for the Arab parties. An additional 3.2 percent voted for the Reservists, and 1.8 percent voted for Amcha Yisrael. Voter turnout increased 16 percent from the 2022 election.

== Twin towns – sister cities ==
Karmiel is twinned with:

- Berat, Albania
- Câmpulung Moldovenesc, Romania
- Charlottenburg-Wilmersdorf (Berlin), Germany
- Denver, United States
- Hamar, Norway
- Kisvárda, Hungary
- Mangalia, Romania
- Metz, France
- Pittsburgh, United States

== Notable people ==
- Aviv Alush (born 1982), actor, musician, model, and television host
- Almog Buzaglo (born 1992), footballer
- Erel Margalit (born 1961), politician and a high-tech and social entrepreneur
- Moran Samuel (born 1982), paralympic basketball player and world champion rower
- Ezequiel Skverer (born 1989), basketball player

== See also ==
- Emtan Karmiel
