= Rural council =

Rural council may refer to:

== Administrative subdivisions ==
- Gram panchayat, India
- Former name of Sangguniang Barangay, subdivision type in Philippines
- Rural municipality (Nepal) or Gaunpalika, Nepal
- Rural Council (Ukraine)
- Selsoviet (literally "rural council"):
  - Lowest level of administrative division in rural areas in the Soviet Union, preserved as a third tier of administrative-territorial division throughout Ukraine, Belarus and some parts of Russia
  - Administrative organ (council) which manages the division
  - The building of the selsoviet administration

== Other ==
- Rural community council, Great Britain
- Rural district council, former local government unit in England, Ireland and Wales
- White House Rural Council, entity within President Obama's Domestic Policy Council of the Executive Office of the President of the United States.

== See also ==
- Municipal council; some of these may be for rural localities

- Community council, lowest tier of local government in England, Scotland and Wales
- Village council (Palestinian Authority)
