= Yussuf Hamis =

Israeli-Arab politician (1921–1986)

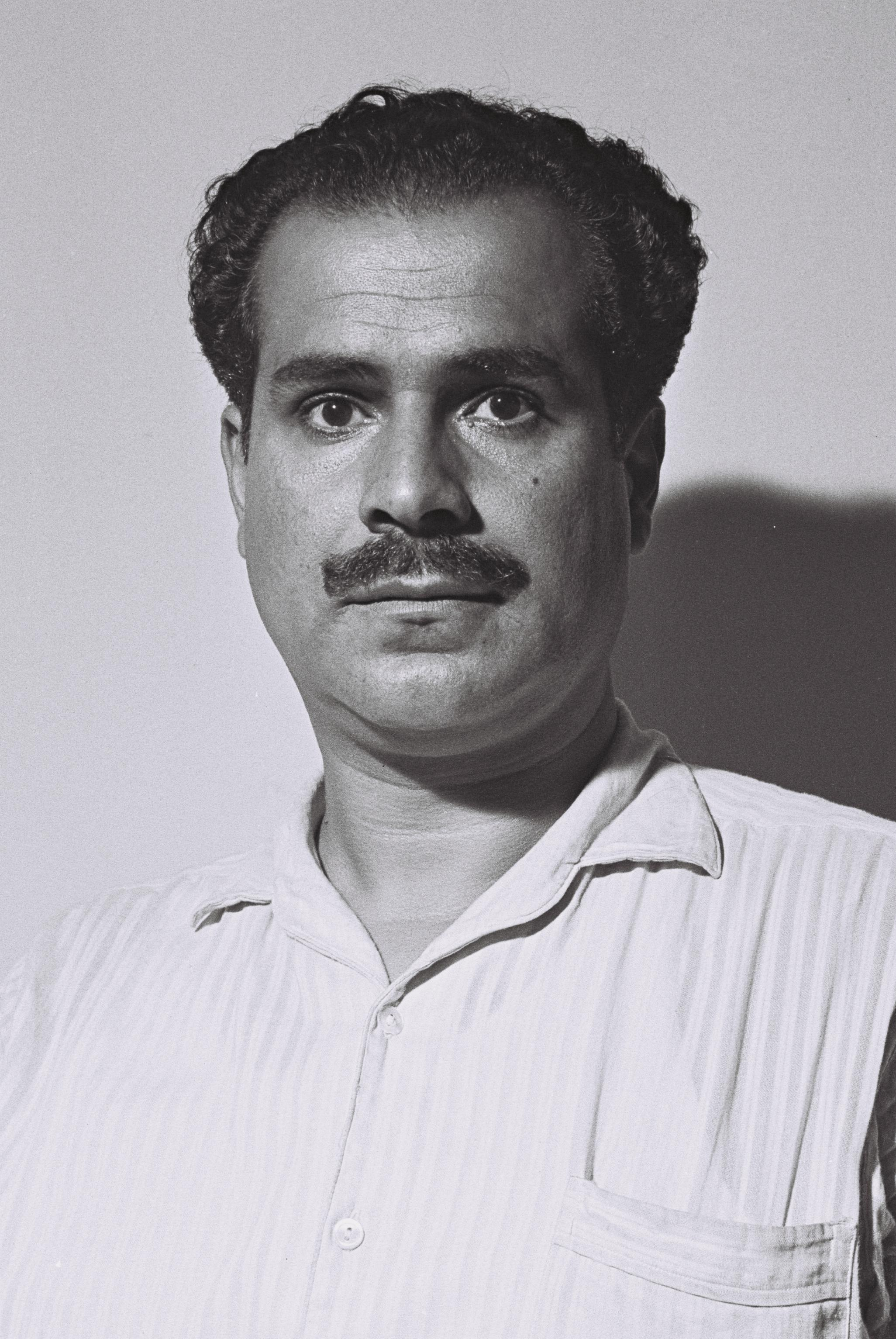
- Hamis in May 1955

Faction represented in the Knesset
- 1955–1965: Mapam

Personal details
- Born: 10 May 1921 Reineh, Mandatory Palestine
- Died: 22 September 1986 (aged 65)

Yussuf Hamis (Arabic: يوسف خميس, Hebrew: יוסוף ח'מיס; 10 May 1921 – 22 September 1986) was an Israeli Arab politician who served as a member of the Knesset for Mapam between 1955 and 1965.

== Biography ==
Born in Reineh, Hamis attended a high school in Nazareth, before studying at the American University of Beirut.

In 1949 he joined Mapam and became a member of the secretariat of the Haifa branch, before becoming a member of the party's national central committee and secretariat. He was tenth on the party's list for the July 1955 elections, but the party won only nine seats. However he entered the Knesset on 21 September that year as a replacement for the deceased Yitzhak Yitzhaky. He was re-elected in 1959 and 1961. After being placed thirteenth on the party's list for the 1965 elections, he lost his seat as Mapam won only nine seats.

The following year he joined the Histadrut's actions committee, and in 1977 became a member of the union's central committee. He also served as deputy chairman of its Arab department, was on the board of Beit Berl, and was a member of the Hapoel sports organisation's central committee.
