= Yitzhak Yitzhaky (politician born 1902) =

Israeli politician (1902–1955)

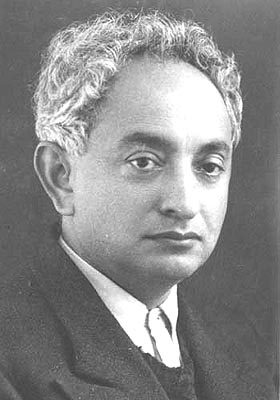
- Yitzhaky in 1955

Faction represented in the Knesset
- 1955: Mapam

Personal details
- Born: 11 October 1902 Rîbnița, Russian Empire
- Died: 22 September 1955 (aged 52) Petah Tikva, Israel

Yitzhak Yitzhaky (Hebrew: יצחק יצחקי; 11 October 1902 – 21 September 1955) was an Israeli politician who served as a member of the Assembly of Representatives and Knesset.

== Biography ==
Born Yitzhok Lishovsky in Rîbnița in the Podolia Governorate of the Russian Empire (today in Moldova), Yitzhaky served in the Red Army in the Russian Civil War. A member of HeHalutz, he helped organise Jewish self-defence against pogroms. He emigrated to Palestine in 1921, and joined Gdud HaAvoda, in which he worked draining swamps, building roads and construction.

He became one of the leaders of the Left Poale Zion movement, and returned to Europe as an emissary for it in 1925. In 1934 he was amongst the founders of the Marxist Circles movement, and also helped establish the League for Arab-Jewish Co-operation. He later helped initiate the merger of Left Poale Zion and Ahdut HaAvoda, and was amongst the Mapam leadership after it was formed by a merger of Ahdut HaAvoda-Poale Zion and the Hashomer Hatzair Workers Party. He was elected to the Knesset on the Mapam list in the July 1955 elections, but died later that year. His seat was taken by Yussuf Hamis.
