= Local service district =

Local service district may refer to these administrative units in Canada:

- Local service district (New Brunswick)
- Local service district (Newfoundland and Labrador)

== See also ==
- Local services board, in Ontario
