= Nikollë Gazulli =

Albanian priest and lexicographer

Nikollë Gazulli (Dajç, 15 June 1895 – Vrith, 23 March 1946) was a parish priest and Albanologist lexicographer with an interest in ethnography. He wrote the first toponymic dictionary of Albanian and is known as the co-founder of lexicography in the language along with Pano Tase, though Gazulli would be the last cleric to publish in the field within Albania’s borders. Linguist Aleksandër Xhuvani called him the "Father of Albanian toponymy, while Father Zef Pllumi called him “the greatest expert the [Gregj Fishta] Franciscan Library ever had [on staff]." Despite his contributions, he was held in damnatio memoriae by the People's Socialist Republic of Albania and therefore never mentioned in Albanological discourse during its rule.

== Biography ==
Gazulli was born in Dajç, Zadrima, in the Roman Catholic Diocese of Sapë, the son of Hiluk Gjoni and Tone (daughter of Jak Gjini from Gramsh). He was the second son, the oldest being Gjon.Nikollë started his education at the village school founded in 1902 by Ndre Mjeda, where Kolë Zezaj of Shkodër taught. Gazulli went on to high school at the Albanian Pontifical Seminary in Shkodër and to higher education at the University of Innsbruck in Austria. He was fluent in German, Italian, Latin, and some Slavic languages, as well as French and Turkish.

After the failure of the Dukagjin uprising of 1926, his brother was killed, and Nikollë was imprisoned from 1924 to 1930 in Gjirokastër. He was freed by the intercession of Gjergj Fishta, Norbert Jokl, and Aleksandër Stavre Drenova. For many years, he worked as a parish priest in Shkrel, Malësia. However, he also worked in Bogë, Zagorë, Kastrat, Koplik, among other towns.

In March 1946, the communist forces are said to have found him hiding in a cave near Shkrel, and they apprehended him under suspicion of belonging to the dissident group SIM. According to Father Pllum, he was killed by his host, Nikollë Prekushi.

== Work ==
Traveling the villages of the parish and elsewhere (including Kelmend, Hot, Pukë, Dajç on the Buna, and Ulcinj), Gazulli collected and analyzed thousands of rare words, phrases, proper nouns, folklore, history, etc. He summarized them in two major works: Fjalorth i ri (fjalë të rralla të përdoruna në Veri të Shqipnisë) (“New Dictionary [Rare Words Used in Northern Albania]") published in 1941 in the journal Visaret e kombit; and Fjalori toponomastik ("Toponymic Dictionary") published from 1939 to 1943 in Fishta's magazine, Hylli i Dritës.

Fjalorth i ri and Tase's Fjalorthin e ri, fjalë të rralla të përdoruna në Jug të Shqipnís ("Ne Dictionary of Rare Words Used in Southern Albania," Visaret e Kombit, Issue 12, Tirana, 1941) were the first two regional dialect dictionaries in Albanian. Fjalori toponomastik was the first dictionary of place names.

Jokl and Gazulli corresponded actively. Jokl actively consulted with Gazulli for etymological insights. While Jokl found words such as shkarthdhi ("scattered") and pershkardhë ("whitewashed"), for instance, to be of Slavic origin, Nikollë found the same pattern in place names such as Gomsiqe, Bardhanjol, and Kashnjet. Always on the lookout for rare, previously unwritten words, Gazulli asked Jokl on 14 December 1930, to borrow a book or dictionary to explain their meaning in other languages.

Gazulli's scrupulousness was ridiculed by the erudite Karl Gurakuqi, the High Inspector of Education and promoter of Gazulli's who censored some erotic words from Fjalorth i ri that were considered uncouth at the time. Gazulli wrote the Fjalori toponomastik under the pseudonym, "Gelasius." His work was rarely quoted during the communist regime, though the few exceptions included Eqrem Çabej and Xhuvani's essays, "Parashtesat e gjuhes shqipe" ("Prefixes in the Albanian Language," 1956) and "Prapashtesat e gjuhes shqipe" ("Suffixes in the Albanian Language," 1962), which both cite Fjalorth i ri. The compilers of the Fjalor i gjuhes shqipe ("Dictionary of the Albanian Language") published in 1954 cited Gazulli as well, including Çabej, Kostaq Cipo, Mahir Domi, Anton Krajni, and Osman Myderizi.

== Work list ==
- Fjalorth i ri (fjalë të rralla të përdoruna në Veri të Shqipnisë), Tirana, 1941, published in the journal Visaret e kombit, Issue XI, (524 pages with 4819 words). Reprinted by Çabej Publications and edited by Enkelejda Shamku-Shkrelit in 2005.
- Fjalori toponomastik, published in parts in the journal Hylli i Dritës Issue 2, February 1939, year XV, pp. 120–129 and Issues 9–12, 1943, pp. 391–406 (shkronjat A-K), over the course of 21 issues and 173 pages (unfinished).
