= Boga (region) =

Region in Albania; historic Albanian tribe

Boga is a region and former bajrak (military-administrative unit) of the Kelmendi, a historical Albanian tribe (fis) and ethnographic region located in Malësia, northern Albania.

== Name ==
The toponym Boga is attested in the 1688 map of the Venetian cartographer Francesco Maria Coronelli and on the 1689 map of the Italian cartographer Giacomo Cantelli da Vignola as Bogu. The etymology of Boga is debated. One theory maintains that it is derived from Albanian bokë, meaning "barren/rocky farmland" or "mountain side". Another view argues that it may be a derivative of Slavic bog ("god").

== Geography ==
Boga is situated in the upper valley of the Përroi i Thatë (Dry Creek) in northern Albania. It makes up the uppermost part of the valley on the road from Koplik leading over the mountains into Theth, in Shala territory. In present times it is administratively a part of the Municipality of Shkrel. The Boga bajrak was the southernmost territory of the Kelmendi and neighboured Kastrati to the west, Shala to the east, and Shkreli and Plani to the south. The main settlement of the small tribe is the village of Bogë, which is situated at 950 m. in altitude.

== Origins ==
According to an oral tradition of the Kelmendi recorded by Yugoslav anthropologist Andrija Jovićević, the vast majority of the brotherhoods from Boga trace their ancestry back to the figure of Bogi; a son of the forefather of the Kelmendi, Amati. He also noted that the area was initially inhabited by the Shkreli, who were expulsed by Bogi and his sons following their expansion southwards from Kelmend. Indigenous anas brotherhoods were also incorporated into the community, as is the case with the Ndrejaj. However, according to Noel Malcolm, this oral tradition may have been fabricated by the Kelmendi in the nineteenth century as they had recently incorporated the area as its fourth bajrak in ca. 1897, and legends of common descent would allow for better accommodation. Although, Malcolm acknowledges that it is unlikely that these legends of shared patrilineal ancestry were just constructs as these traditions were socially vital due to strong taboos against marriage to cousins related through the male line and the importance of tribal identity.

The Boga maintained close ties and relations with the Shala and Shkreli, however, they sided with the more powerful Kelmendi which protected them and with whom they shared common patrilineal kinship.

== Population ==
In Karl Steinmetz's travel, he concluded that they were made up of 75 Catholic families, which lived in 10 villages: Gjokaj, Preçaj, Malej, Gegaj, Mihaj, Leshaj, Ulaj, Mikaj, Ulgjekaj and Nrej.

In the first reliable census taken in Albania in 1918 under Austro-Hungarian administration, the population statistics of the Boga tribe were given as follows: 34 households with a total of 228 inhabitants. This comprised the settlements and surroundings of: Kolaj and Preçaj.

== Culture ==
The Boga tribe is Catholic, and it celebrates the feast of Saint Michael on 29 September, by the slaughtering and roasting of sheep on a spit. The Boga sustained themselves primarily from their herds, which grazed on the rich mountain pastureland in the summer. In the winter period, they drove their animals as far as the region of Mamurras, south of Lezha, where the men were also involved in the lumber trade, cutting down the then dense forests of the area. The village of Bogë in the region of Rugova, western Kosovo, was founded by Kelmendi tribesmen from Boga.
