= Luigj Pici =

Luigj Pici (Ulcinj, Montenegro, March 17, 1907 – Malësia, Albania, November 10, 1946) was a Roman Catholic parish priest in Reç and Lohja, Albania, and a member of the Albanian resistance.

== Biography ==
He was born in Ulcinj in 1907. He graduated from seminary training in Padua.

During World War II, he participated in the Albanian resistance. According to royal documents of King Zog, he was reported to be sheltering the troops of resistance leaders Gjovalin Luka and Llesh Marashi, leading to warrants from the authorities. He continued engaging with the anti-fascist movement. On April 27, 1943, after the First Steering Committee Conference of the National Liberation Movement was held in Dobraç, Shkodër, he joined a committee that included Sadik Bekteshi and Mark Ndoja. On January 7, 1945, he was part of the Commission for Social Assistance to War Victims. On August 7, 1945, he was awarded the National Flag Decoration. That same year, he served on the executive committee of the Antifascist Front, but disagreed with their trials of Catholic clergy, eventually being expelled from his political and social positions for defending Jesuit Fathers Daniel Dajani and Giovanni Fausti. On November 10, 1946, he was found dead on a street in Malësia.
