= Reçi (tribe) =

Albanian tribe

Reçi is a historical Albanian tribe. It is located in the ethnographic region of Malësia northern Albania. The historical heartland of the tribe is the village of Reç in Malësia, but place names linked to them also appear on settlements such as Reč in Ulcinj where a part of them also lived.

They appear in historical record for the first time in 1330 in the Dečani chrysobulls as part of the Albanian (arbanas) katun (pastoral community) of Llesh Tuzi, in an area stretching southwards from modern Tuzi Municipality along the Lake Skadar to a village near modern Koplik. This katund included many communities that later formed their own separate communities: Matagushi and his brothers, Reçi and his sons, Bushati and his sons, Pjetër Suma (ancestor of Gruda) and Pjetër Kuçi, first known ancestor of Kuči.

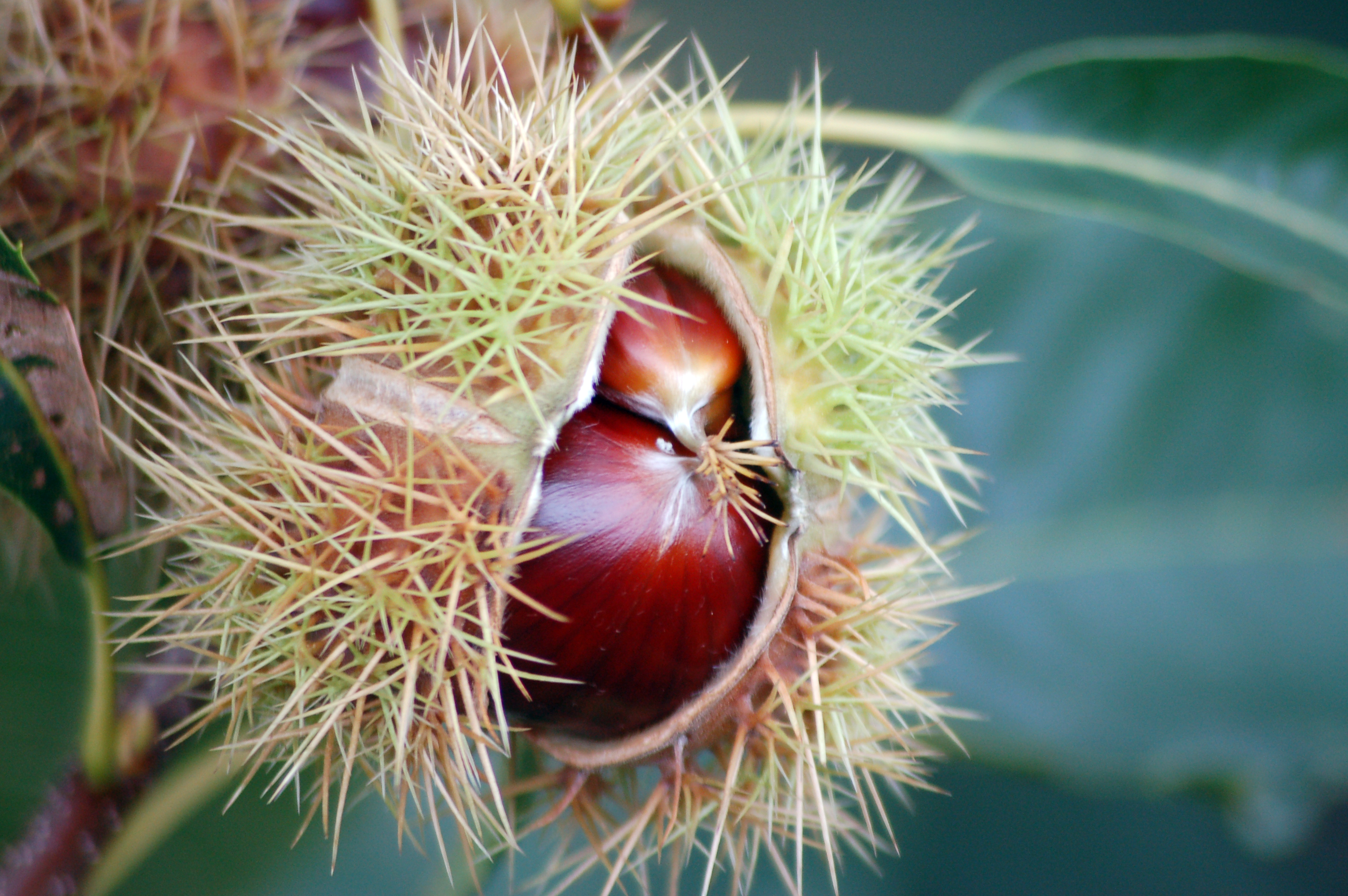
Chestnuts are locally seen as a symbol of Reçi

In the 1416-17 Venetian Cadastre of the area we find several names linked to the tribe. Among them we have Aleks, Gjin, Gjergj, Sardë and Sergj Reçi, all of whom landowners in the village of Reç itself, along with a villager named Soma Reçi. In the village of Valm we find the names of Tanush Reçi as well as the brothers Andre and Bitër Reçi. In the village of Trush i Madh the names of Bitër and Lukë Reçi, the village of Gur i Zi records Lazër and Martin Reçi and the villages of Balldren, Belan and Samrisht record the names of Bitër, Mark and Nikollë Reçi respectively.

The 1485 Ottoman Defter of Shkodër mentions the village of Reçi as part of the timar of Gazi Shuxhau. The village had 8 families and 2 bachelors living in it. The names of the heads of the households were Nika, Kola, Leka, Stepan, Gjergj and Vuk Reçi, the families of Nika and Dejan Stepani as well as those of Ukça Grada and Gjergj Nika. During this time, the Reçi had moved to Malësia from the lowlands near Buna where the village Reč is today.

According to Edith Durham, the Reçi Tribe were of mixed descent from Shllaku and Pulati, like the neighbouring Lohja tribe, this was also mentioned by Robert Elsie. The Reç tribe and area of Diber have their origins from this tribe in the north, the Reçi moved to Diber and settled there.

Traditionally the villagers of Reçi are known for their rich history in chestnut cultivation, with the village frequently being referred to as Gështenja e Alpeve (Chestnut of the Alps). According to local legend, the oldest chestnuts planted in the village are around 250 years old. The Chestnuts of Reçi are a protected area listed as a Category III Natural Monument by the International Union for Conservation of Nature (IUCN), having been declared so in 1974. It encompasses much of the heavily wooded and hilly area traditionally inhabited by the tribe. Reçi historically has been religiously mixed with a majority Muslim and a minority Roman Catholic population.

Jusuf Reçi was from this tribe, he was a loyal subject to the Toptani family and a miller. On April 20, 1924, he shot Avni Rustemi on Durrës Road in Tirana. He is most known for the murder of Avni Rustemi. The reason of his murder of Avni was due to the Toptani family seeking revenge against him for murdering Essad Pasha Toptani.

The Reçi family has been recorded in Tirana since the 1800s with records showing a Hafsa Reçi (1848-1928) living there in the late 1800s with her husband Metan Vorpsi (1841-1911) from the Vorpsi family. The Reçi family still live in Tirana now.
