= Boga =

Boga is a common name for fishes and may refer to:

- Haemulon vittatum
- Leporinus obtusidens

Boga may also refer to:

- Boga (soft drink), a Tunisian brand of soft drinks
- BOGA, the Bern Botanical Gardens in Switzerland
- Boga (noisemaker), from the Philippines
- Boga (Star Wars), a Varactyl from the Star Wars universe
- Lake Boga, Victoria, a postal district
- Boga, the definite form of Bogë, Albania
- Boga, the definite form of Bogë, Kosovo
- Boga language, an Afro-Asiatic language of Nigeria
- Boga (river), a tributary of the Crișul Pietros in Bihor County, Romania
- Jérémie Boga (born 1997), Ivorian footballer
- Leon Boga (1886–1974), Aromanian writer, schoolteacher and archivist in Romania

== See also ==
- Boge (disambiguation)
- Bogë (disambiguation)
