= Boge =

Boge may refer to:

- a slang for Cigarettes

Bogë may refer to:

- Boge, Gotland, a settlement on the Swedish island of Gotland
- Bogë, Kosovo
- Bogë, Albania

== See also ==
- Boga (disambiguation)
