= Shkreli =

Shkreli may refer to:

- Shkreli (region), region in the Malësia region of Northern Albania
- Shkreli (tribe), Albanian tribe
- Azem Shkreli (1938–1997), Albanian writer and poet
- Lesh Shkreli (born 1957), Albanian-American soccer player
- Martin Shkreli (born 1983), American businessman and convicted felon
- Bernard Lown § Shkreli Awards, presented by the Lown Institute, for "worst examples of profiteering and dysfunction in health care"
