= Lohja (tribe) =

Region in northern Albania; historic Albanian tribe

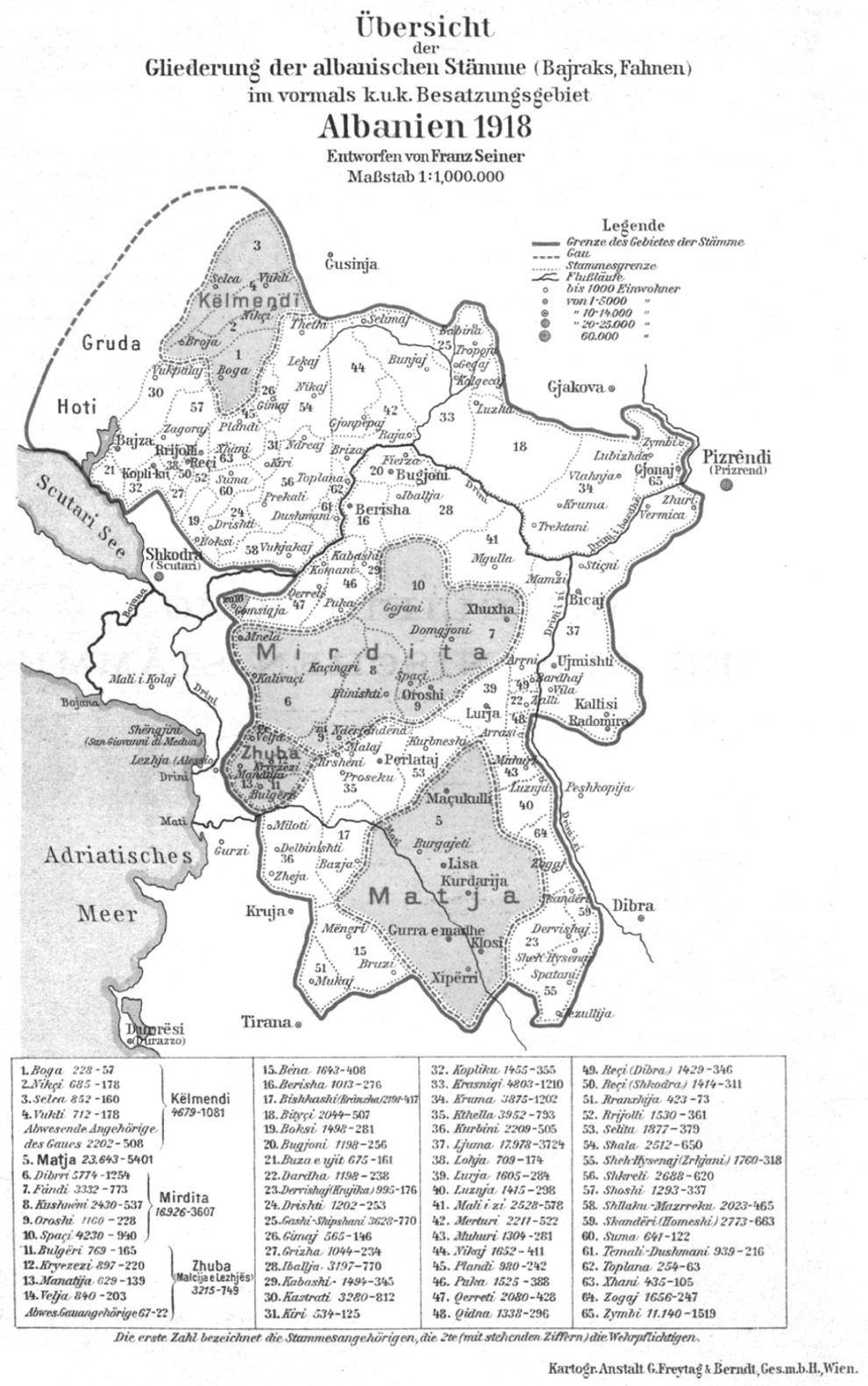
Albanian bayraks as of 1918 from Franz Seiner. Lohja located in section 38, between Kopliku, Reçi, Rjolli.

Lohja is a historical Albanian tribe located in a small area of the same name in Malësia, northern Albania.

== Geography ==
Lohja is a small region situated in the Malësia e Madhe District, near Dedaj, about 12 km north of Koplik. It borders on the historical regions of Kastrati to the west and north, and on Reç and Rrjolli to the south. It includes the settlements of Lohë e Sipërme (Upper Lohja) and Lohë e Poshtme. Many families from Lohja over the centuries have moved to the central settlement of Koplik, where they form part of the local population. After 1990, Lohja saw heavy emigration and depopulation. Less than 500 people live today in upper and lower Lohja.

== History ==
Lohja first appears in historical record in the form of Loho who is mentioned in 1348. In the cadaster of Shkodra (Scutari) in 1416-7 Lohja (Logoa) appears as a village of eight households. The surnames of its inhabitants are all different, an indication that the village was not a settlement based on kinship ties in contrast to other settlements of Albanian tribes that appear in the cadaster. The cadaster also reveals that part of lower Lohja was identified as part of Rrjolli at that time but was part of Lohja administratively. One of the three households in that area was headed by a Jon Gruda. Oral tradition in lower Lohja has maintained that it traces its origin partly to the Old Gruda tribe. As an anthroponym, it doesn't appear in Lohja, but in one of the bigger settlements around Shkodra, in Grizhë, where Andrea Lochoy is found. After the 1479, most of northern Albania fell under Ottoman control. In the first Ottoman defter in 1485, Lohja appears as a village of 40 households.

Among the first local timar holders of Shkodra after 1479 an Ali Aga Loha-zade is mentioned. He descended from Lohja, but can't be identified with a specific historical figure who converted to Islam. Lohja itself in 1582 had 31 households and 21 unmarried inhabitants, all Catholic except for one household. The late 16th century also saw the formation of 3/4 major brotherhoods of upper Lohja today. The first brotherhood, the Vukcaj were locals of Upper Lohja. The other three: Ivaj, Kocaj and Ulgjokaj trace their origin from the three brothers Koc, Ul and Iv Gjoka possibly from Koja. Giuseppe Valentini proposed an alternative origin from the Drekali brotherhood of Kuči (about 6 km north of Koja), which itself came from Berisha.

Their sister was married into a brotherhood of lower Lohja. Some of the families of lower Lohja come from different neighbouring areas. These include Shllaku, Shala, the Pulati region and Gruda.

The Lohja tribe had a population of some 2,500 in the last years of the 19th century.

== Bibliography ==
- Zamputi, Injac (1977). Regjistri i kadastrēs dhe i koncesioneve pēr rrethin e Shkodrës 1416-1417. Academy of Sciences of Albania.
