= Battle of Reç =

World War II military action

Battle of Reçi
- Part of World War II in Albania
Date	August 30–31, 1943
Location	Reç, Albania
Result	Albanian victory

Belligerents
LANÇ	Italy

Commanders and leaders
Unknown	(Kingdom of Italy) Colonel De Blazio

Units involved
Perlat Rexhepi Battalion	(Fascist Italy) Italian crew command (infantry, cavalry, carabinieri)

Strength
30–40 Albanian partisans	(Kingdom of Italy) 1,200–2,400 soldiers

Casualties and losses
Unknown	40–147 KIA several hundred were wounded

The Reçi War (Albanian: Lufta e Reçit), was the toughest and most successful resistance against the Royal Italian Army in the Shkodra region. This war took place in World War II in Albania, 1943 and was the last Albanian war against the Italian invaders.

== Background ==
As the Albanian partisans retook many of the regions that were under Italian occupation, the situation in Albania got better and better. To clear the Mbishkodra area, where the influence of the National Liberation Movement was increasing and the partisan formations were growing day by day, they prepared the Italian fascists before a military operation. The direction of the operation was entrusted to Colonel De Blazio, the deputy commander of the sector. The forces would be accompanied by artillery and the actions would be supported by aviation.

== The Battle ==
The attack of the Italian fascists began on August 30, the Albanian partisans were prepared and defended themselves against the Italians. The Italians started the operation on the village of Reç with 200 soldiers. However, when the Italians expected a counterattack from the Albanian partisans, the Italians brought in reinforcements and had a total manpower of 1,200–2,400 soldiers, greatly outnumbering them. The Albanian partisans attacked the Italians back and also inflicted a great deal of damage on the Italians. The Albanian partisans were outnumbered they had about 143 soldiers in this battle. However, only 30 to 40 Albanian partisans took part in this Battle, nevertheless they fought to the end and remained steadfast.

== Aftermath ==
The battle ended victoriously for the Albanians, many of the Italian soldiers were killed or wounded in battle. Altogether it is estimated that 40–147 Italian soldiers were killed in action by the Albanian partisans and several hundred wounded
