= Zef Pllumi =

Albanian Franciscan priest and memoirist

At Zef Pllumi
- Priest
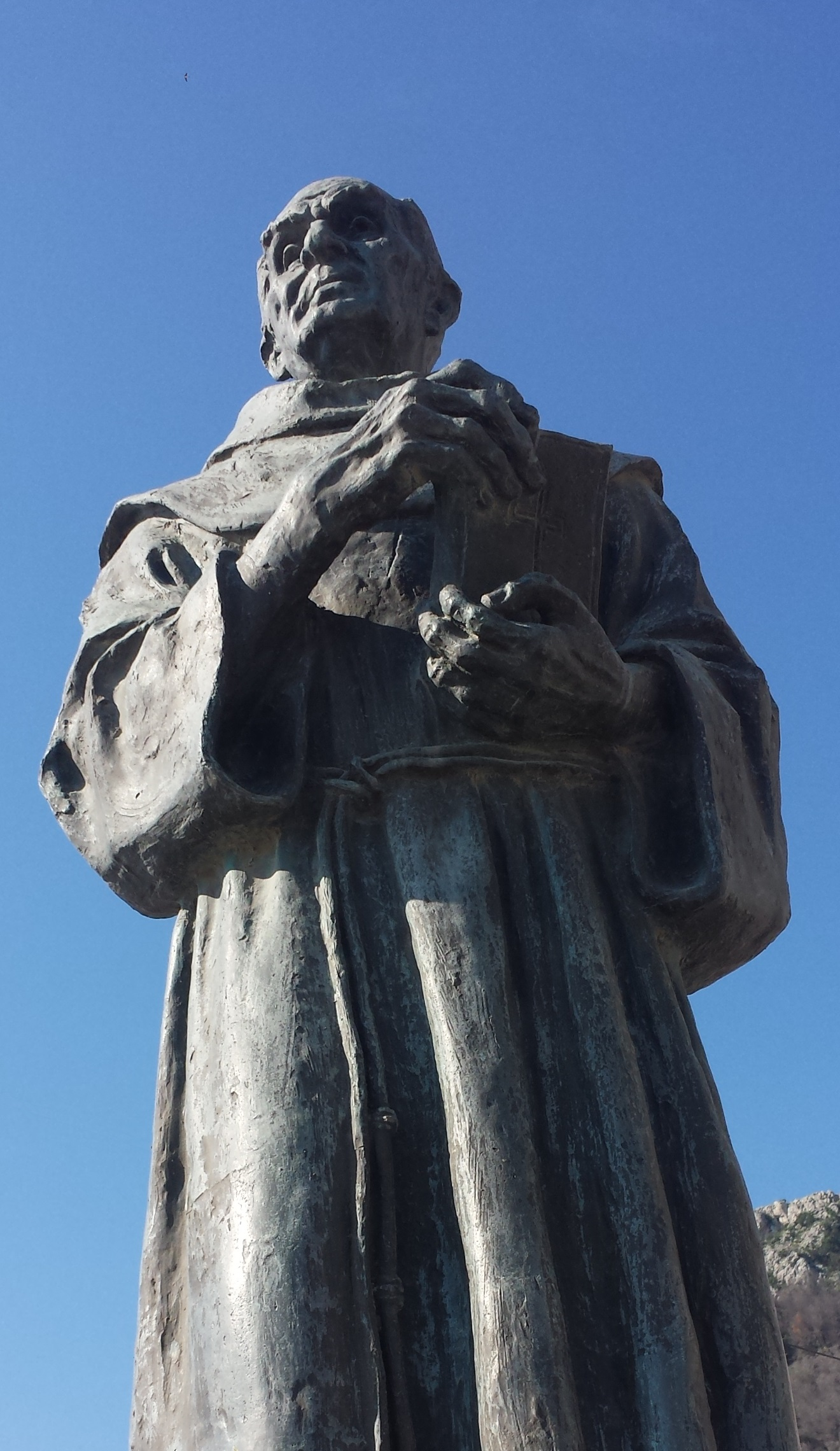
- Statue of Pllumi in Shëngjin

Personal details
- Born: 28 August 1924 Shëngjin, Albania
- Died: 25 September 2007 (aged 83) Rome, Italy
- Denomination: Roman Catholic Church

Sainthood
- Attributes: Priest's attire
- Patronage: Persecuted Christians

Zef Pllumi (28 August 1924 – 25 September 2007) was an Albanian Franciscan priest and memoirist. After 26 years in communist prisons he wrote the non-fiction works Live To Tell, A True Story of Religious Persecution in Albania (Albanian: Rrno vetëm për me tregue), also known as the Albanian gulag archipelago, The Great Franciscans (Albanian: Franceskanet e Medhaj), The Book of Memories (1944–1951) (Albanian: Libri i Kujtimeve (1944–1951)).

== Life ==
Zef Pllumi was born as Prenka Pllumi on 28 August 1924, in the Mali i Rencit, Shëngjin, in a family of Shkreli origin. As he says in his autobiographical book My infancy saga, his mother Luke Mrija gave birth to him in a field.

In his early years, in Qafë of Tëthores (located in Bogë, on the Shkreli mountains), he met Gjergj Fishta and Anton Harapi, who would come to meet through his uncle Pashko Toma. In one of those meetings, Pashko told Harapi that the little boy wanted to become a friar. Father Harapi gave him a medallion of Saint Francis that he was wearing around his neck and told Pllumi to conserve it with a lot of care and present it one day at the Franciscan College of Scutari, where he would later pursue his studies as a young friar.

In 1929, five-year-old Pllumi became the pupil of Alfons Tracki (1896–1946), a German missionary in Velipojë. In 1931 he entered the Franciscan College of Shkodër, where the main teachers were personalities of Catholic Albania's religious and cultural life, such as Gjergj Fishta, Anton Harapi, Martin Gjoka, Marin Sirdani and Gjon Shllaku. Pllumi graduated in 1944 with a classical education. In 1943–4 Pllumi, still in school, was one of the collaborators of the Hylli i Dritës magazine, and the personal secretary of Anton Harapi, provincial of the Franciscans in Albania. During this time Pllumi assisted in the Franciscan Archives.

At age 22, on 14 December 1946, Pllumi was arrested by the communist regime and was condemned to three years of imprisonment, first at the Big Prison of Shkodër and then in the camps of Beden, located in the Myzeqe plain, and in Orman-Pojanit, located in Maliq. After three years he returned to his family in Shkodër. He was accused of being the personal secretary of Anton Harapi.

Pllumi returned in the Franciscan Convent and during 1949–1951 became a technician of nusmatics within the Museum of Shkodër. In 1956 he was ordained as a priest and served for the following 12 years as the priest of Shosh, Dukagjin.

In 1967 Pllumi was again arrested and had to serve jail for an additional 23 years in different prisons in Spaç, Reps, Skrofotinë of Vlorë, Ballsh, Zejmen-Shënkoll and Tirana. In prison he met with notable political prisoners, such as Gjin Marku, Kasëm Trebeshina, Zef Mala, and Dashnor Mamaqi.

=== After release from prison ===
On 11 April 1989 he was released from prison and he served as a priest at the Church of Saint Anthony in Tirana until 1997.

He met with Mother Teresa when she went to Albania and, from 1993 until 1997, he started to republish the magazine Hylli i Dritës, which after a six-year pause was republished in 2003. During the 1990s he published the trilogy Rrno vetëm për me tregue, Françeskanët e mëdhenj, Frati i pashallarëve Bushatli, Erazmo Balneo, and Ut heri diçebamus-siç i thonim dje.

He found the relics of Father Gjergj Fishta and republished the works of the Franciscans of Albania.

Pllumi died on 25 September 2007 in the Gemelli hospital in Rome, Italy, and was buried on 30 September 2007 in Shkodër.

== Recognition ==
In 2006 Alfred Moisiu, then president of Albania decorated Pllumi with the Order Nderi i Kombit. He also received the literary prize The Golden Pen from the Ministry of Education of Albania for his trilogy.

== Works ==
- Rrno vetëm për me tregue
- Françeskanët e mëdhaj – memories on the e Padres rreth Etënve duke rreshtue 12 prej tyne, si apostujt.
- Frati i pashallarëve Bushatli, Erazmo Balneo – shkruem mbi bazën e një ditari të 1802 që Át Zefi ka lexue kur punonte në Arkivin Françeskan.
- Histori kurrë e shkrueme
- Saga e fëmijnisë – work on his early childhood.
- Ut heri diçebamus-siç i thonim dje
