= Anno I =

Anno I can refer to:

- Anno I, archbishop of Cologne 708-710
- The first year of the Fascist Era, 1922
