= Bedri =

Bedri is a Turkish given name for males. Notable people with the name include:

- Bedri Baykam (born 1957), Turkish artist
- Bedri Böke (1920–1974), Turkish equestrian
- Bedri Gjinaj (1913–1945), Albanian nationalist
- Bedri Greca (born 1990), Albanian footballer
- Bedri Gürsoy (1902–1994), Turkish footballer
- Bedri Hamza (born 1963), Kosovar politician
- Bedri Hoxha, Albanian politician
- Bedri İncetahtacı (1960–1999), Turkish politician
- Bedri Karafakıoğlu (1915–1978), Turkish academic
- Bedri Omuri (born 1957), Albanian footballer
- Bedri Pejani (1885–1946), Albanian politician
- Bedri Rahmi Eyüboğlu (1911–1975), Turkish painter and poet
- Bedri Ryustemov (born 1995), Bulgarian association football player
- Bedri Spahiu (1908–1998), Albanian politician and general
