= Education in Mitrovica =

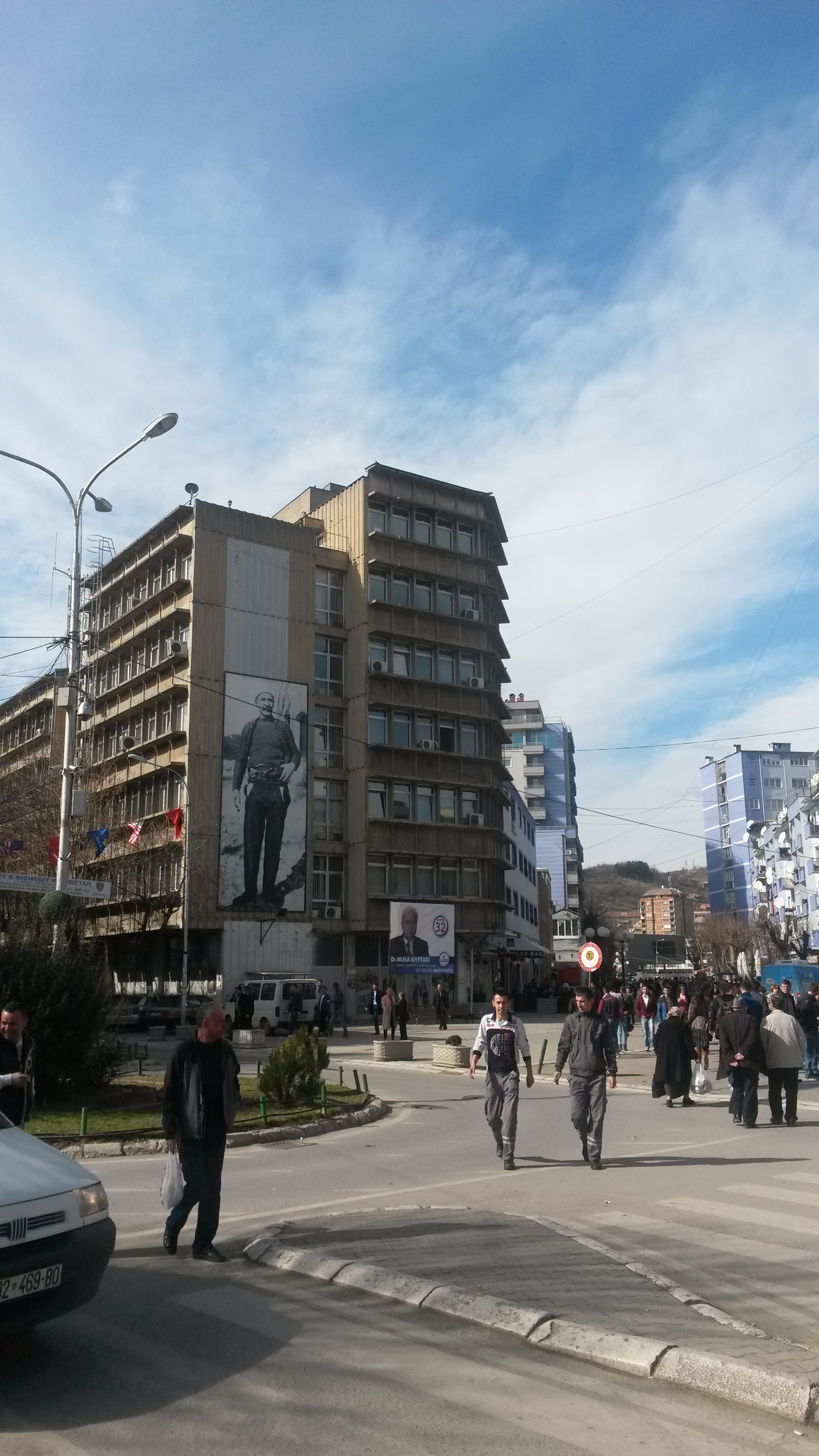
Public Library, Mitrovica

Education in Mitrovica is provided by a number of public and private institutions. With more than 36 percent of the population in Mitrovica being under 19 years old Mitrovica has a large number of primary schools, secondary schools and higher education institutes. These schools are located throughout the municipality, which is compromised by the city of Mitrovica, its 26 southern villages, and the northern part of the city.

A location map with the education institutions of Mitrovica is available online.

Mitrovica features one of the most profound ethnic tensions in south east Europe. It thereby witnessed the highest frequency of ethnic incidents, as well as most sizable. Since its division in 1999, with the river Ibar serving as de facto ethnic border, its educational system is also divided.

== Higher Education ==
Mitrovica has four higher education providers, one in north Mitrovica and three in south Mitrovica. Whereas the north Mitrovica based University of Pristina, Mitrovica operates under Serbian higher education law the three south Mitrovica based higher education institutions are operating under Kosovo higher education law and are subject to regular accreditations by the Kosovo Accreditation Agency (KAA).

=== Higher Education Providers ===
==== University of Priština, with headquarters in North Mitrovica ====
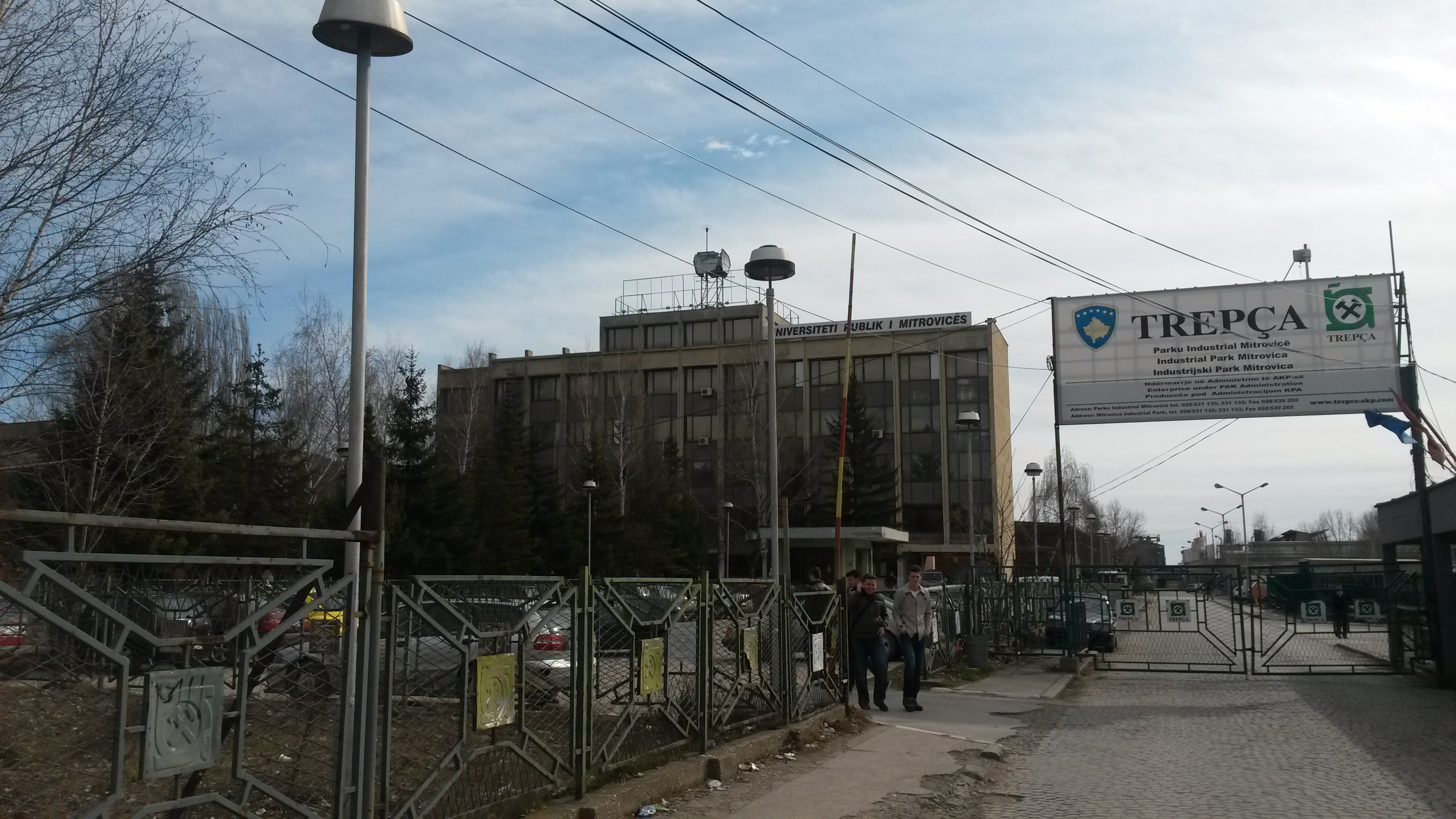
University of Priština, North Mitrovica

With the end of the Kosovo war, the Serbian members of the University of Pristina moved faculties to North Mitrovica. With the assistance of the United Nations Mission in Kosovo (UMNIK), they established the University of Priština, which started operations in 1999. The university of Priština with headquarters in North Mitrovica comprises ten faculties, seven of which are located in North Mitrovica. The North Mitrovica campus hosts the faculties for: economics, medicine, law, mathematics and natural science, technical science, arts and philosophy. The faculty of agriculture is situated in Zubin Potok and Lešak, the faculty for teacher training as well as the faculty for physical education and sports are situated in Leposavić.

In 2009, the North Mitrovica-based faculties of the University of Priština with headquarters in North Mitrovica had 3,889 full-time students, 3,216 part-time students, 582 academic staff and 249 technical staff.

The university is maintaining a multidisciplinary research centre. Since it operates under Serbian law and is funded by the Ministry of Education, Science and Technological Development of Serbia, it is subject to the rules, standards and procedures of the commission for accreditation and quality assurance of the Republic of Serbia. The University of Pristina, Mitrovica, is regularly evaluated by the IEP (Institutional Evaluation Program).

The university includes a multidisciplinary research centre. It also maintains several cooperation contracts, such as through the European Commission founded Seventh Framework Programme (FP7), the European Science Foundation and Tempus. The current rector of the university is Zdravko Vitošević.

==== University of Mitrovica ====
The foundations of higher education studies in Mitrovica were set with the opening of the Higher Technical School in 1961. In 1970 the Faculty of Engineering opened branches of Mining, Technology and Metallurgy, initially in Mitrovica, school year 1970/71, to continue then in Pristina until the establishment of the Faculty of Mining and Metallurgy in Mitrovica in 1974. Based on the 60-year tradition of higher education in Mitrovica, the Government of the Republic of Kosovo on 6 March 2013 has established the Public University of Mitrovica and the Kosovo Assembly on May 31, 2013, ratified the decision. Based on the 60-year tradition of higher education in Mitrovica, the Government of the Republic of Kosovo on 6 March 2013 has established the Public University of Mitrovica and the Kosovo Assembly on May 31, 2013, ratified the decision. Approved by the Ministry of Education, Science and Technology, at the University of Mitrovica "Isa Boletini" (UMIB) operate six faculties:

- Faculty of Geosciences (FG)

- Bachelor of Science:

- Mining(with specializations: Mining, Geotechnic, Preparation of mineral raw materials)
- Geology
- Materials and Metallurgy (with specializations: Materials, Metallurgy)

- Master of Science:

- Mining(with specializations: Geotechnics, Mining)
- Deposits of mineral raw materials
- Hydrology and Engineering Geology
- Materials
- Metallurgy
- Faculty of Food Technology (FFT)

- Bachelor of Science:

- Food Technology and Engineering
- Technology (with specializations: Environmental Engineering, Chemical Engineering)

- Master of Science:

- Food Technology and Engineering
- Technology (with specializations: Environmental Engineering, Chemical Engineering)
- Faculty of Mechanical and Computer Engineering (FMCE)

- Bachelor of Science:

- Industrial Machinery
- Informatics Engineering
- Economics Engineering

- Master of Science:

- Production Technology
- Engineering Informatics
- Faculty of Law (FL)
- Law - Graduated Jurist - Bachelor
- Faculty of Economics (FE)

- Bachelor of Arts:

- Banking, Finance and Accounting
- Informatics and Management
- Faculty of Education (FE)
- Pre-school Education Bachelor
- Primary Education Bachelor

The founding of the University of Mitrovica was part of a wider Kosovo government initiative to facilitate access to higher education throughout Kosovo. This initiative included the opening of universities besides the University of Pristina in Prizren, Peja, Mitrovica and Gjilan.

The programs were all accredited by KAA in 2012.

Before the opening of the University of Mitrovica, Mitrovica already hosted the Faculty of Applied Technical Sciences of the University of Pristina (FATS).

FATS cooperated with the German TU Bergakademie Freiberg, as well as the Hochschule Ruhr West.

The Rector of the University of Mitrovica is Mr. Alush Musa. In the academic year 2014/15 the University of Mitrovica had 2700 students enrolled, with who have worked 80 professors and assistants full-time, and 105 part times.

The corner stone for the new building for the existing faculties in Mitrovica was laid on 26 December 2012. The new building for the existing faculty costed 1.600.000 euro. The new public university of Mitrovica – its campuses – are planned to cost about 14.000.000 Euro.

==== FAMA College ====
Mitrovica hosts some faculties of the private FAMA college. As per decision of the Kosovo Accreditation Agency, the following Mitrovica based FAMA programs are accredited as by 2013:

- Banking, Finance and Accounting
- Law
- Criminalistics
- Management
- Psychology
- Management and Banking, Finance and Accounting

An attempt by FAMA to offer bachelor's degree programs in nursing and Bio medical laboratories failed in 2012, since KAA rejected accrediting these programs.

==== International Business College Mitrovica (IBCM) ====
IBCM was founded by the Dutch foundation SPARK in 2010. It operates two campuses, one in north Mitrovica and one in south Mitrovica. In the academic year 2024/2025, IBCM enrolled 225 new students. IBCM was originally financed by the governments of Sweden, Denmark, The Netherlands, Switzerland, the European Union and the United Kingdom. The College became public in July 2023, after the formal ratification of its new status by the Kosovo Parliament, and benefits now from additional public funding.

As a result of the strong connections in Europe and thanks to Erasmus+, IBCM programmes are designed to prepare its students to local and international careers. It offers internationally accredited 3.5 year bachelor's degrees (210 ECTS) and 2 year master's degrees (120 ECTS):

- International Sales and Marketing, Bachelor level.
- Public Service Management, Bachelor level.
- Environmental and Agricultural Management, Bachelor level.
- Applied Information technology, Bachelor level.
- International Management & leadership, Master level.

IBCM graduates offers double degrees, international exchange programmes, international credit mobility projects. The study programs have been accredited by the Ministry of Education of the Republic of Kosovo and the Evaluationsagentur Baden-Württemberg (EVALAG).

Prof. Dr. Bedri Peci is the Chairman of the Steering Council. Among the new international members elected in 2024, Prof. Dr. Louis Boisgibault. The current rector is Prof. Dr. Mihone Kerolli – Mustafa.

Since its opening, IBCM operated in rented facilities in north and south Mitrovica. The IBCM north campus moved to a permanent location in December 2013. IBCM south campus has opened in May 2016.

== Secondary education ==
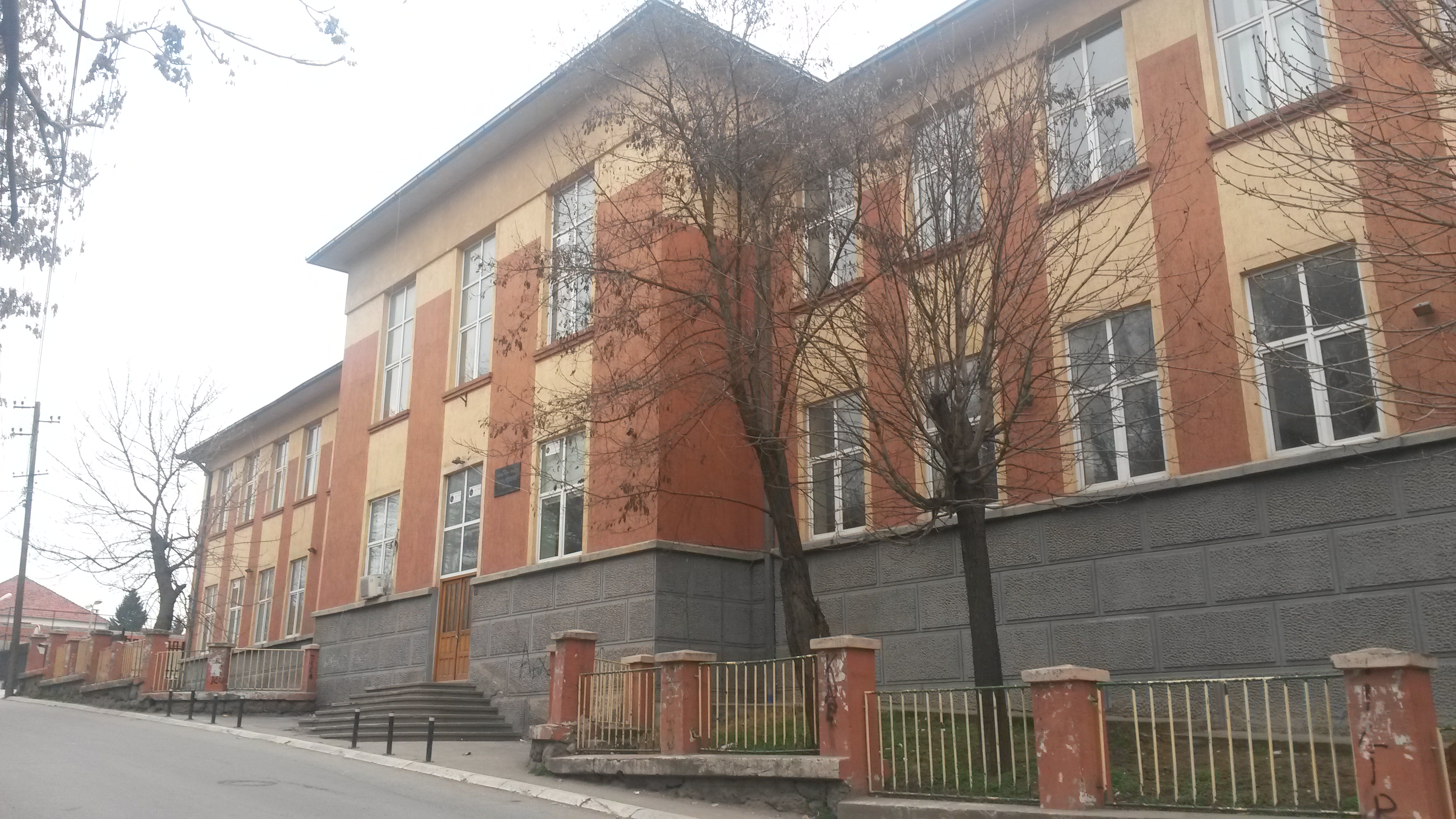
Commercial High School Hasan Pristina, in Mitrovica

Secondary Schools in South Mitrovica

Nr.	Name of school	Location	Number of teachers	Number of Students	Student/Teacher Ratio
1	Gymnasium Frang Bardhi	Mitrovica	30	1821	60,7
2	Commercial High School Hasan Prishtina	Mitrovica	20	1099	54,95
3	Medical High School Dr. Xheladin Deda	Mitrovica	8	770	96,25
4	Technical High School Arkitekt Sinani	Mitrovica	21	959	45,67

South Mitrovica has 4 secondary schools, the Gymnasium "Frang Bardhi" with 1943 students, the economic high school "Hasan Pristina" with 1.130 students, the High Technical School "Arkitekt Sinani" with about 1000 students, the High Medical School "Dr. Xheladin Deda" with about 800 students. North Mitrovica has 4 secondary schools with a total of 1,740 students.

== Primary education ==
There are about 13700 primary school students in South Mitrovica, attending 28 primary schools. Thereby 10 schools are located in the city of Mitrovica and 18 in villages throughout the municipality. In northern Mitrovica/Mitrovicë, there are 11 primary schools with 2,754 pupils and four (4) secondary schools with 1,740 students with 587 employees, including teachers, support staff and school management, one (1) kindergarten with 600 pupils and 58 employees, and other specialized schools.

The majority of the students are enrolled in one of the schools in the city while a majority of the teachers are working in schools outside the central city, in one of the villages. This results in a considerably higher Student-Teacher Ratio (Students per Teacher) in the city than in the countryside.

Primary Schools in South Mitrovica

Nr.	Name of School	Location	Number of Teachers	Number of Students	Student/Teacher Ratio
1	Abdullah Shabani	Mitrovica	16	1097	68,56
2	Aziz Sylejmani	Mitrovica	-	191	-
3	A.Z.Çajupi	Mitrovica	17	529	31,12
4	Bajram Curri	Gushavc	6	292	48,67
5	Bedri Gjinaj	Mitrovice	9	650	72,22
6	Bislim Hajdari	Kacanoll	4	46	11,50
7	Bislim Halimi	Selac	7	37	5,29
8	Elena Gjika	Tuneli i pare	14	503	35,93
9	Fazli Greiçevci	Shipol	24	1292	53,83
10	Gj.K. Skënderbeu	Vagabrice	23	1494	64,96
11	Habib Jusufi	Vllahi	8	76	9,50
12	Hivzi Sylejmani	Kciq i madh	13	599	46,08
13	Ismail Qemali	Mitrovica	12	890	74,17
14	Jusuf Rexha	Koshtova	12	468	39,00
15	Mehë Ukaj	Bajgora	06	262	43,67
16	Meto Bajraktari	Mitrovica	13	906	69,69
17	Migjeni	Mitrovica	23	1792	77,91
18	Minatorët	Rahova	5	104	20,80
19	Muharrem Bekteshi	Mitrovica	22	792	36,00
20	Një Maji	Shubkovc	8	293	36,63
21	Nonda Bulka	Mitrovica	-	176	-
22	Riza Voca	Zabergje	5	16	3,20
23	Sefedin Smakolli	Rashan	10	99	9,90
24	Sylejman Vokshi	Broboniq	05	193	38,60
25	Tefta Tashko	Mitrovica	8	329	41,13
26	Trepça	Stanterg	13	336	25,85
27	Xhevat Jusufi	Bare	10	205	20,50
28	Shaban Idrizi	Zhabar	-	-	-
Total			293	13667	46,65

== Libraries ==
The former public library 'Latif Berisha' in the centre of the city was one of the cities cultural highlights. However it has been moved now to another location.

== Notes ==
Calculations within the tables above have been made based on the references and information provided below.
