= Jusuf Reçi =

Albanian miller and murderer (died 1947)

Jusuf Reçi (also known as Isuf) was an Albanian Miller born in Tirana, Albania (Ottoman Empire when he was born) to the Reçi tribe and he is known for assassinating Avni Rustemi, an Albanian activist, on the 20th of April 1924. Avni's death gave rise to the anti-government demonstrations that led to the June Revolution. (Died in 1947)

Jusuf's family and tribe are originally from northern Albania, with their own settlements in Malësia, Reç, but part of the family migrated down to Tirana. The Reçi family has been recorded in Tirana since the 1800s, with records showing Hafsa Reçi (1848–1928) living there in the late 1800s with her husband Metan Vorpsi (1841–1911) from the Vorpsi family. The Reçi family still lives in Tirana now.

Avni Rustemi is also known for the murder of Essad Pasha Toptani, an Albanian politician. Jusuf was a loyalist to the Toptani family of Tirana, which was a noble family with money and influence in the region. Toptani is remembered among Albanians today as one of the most negative historical figures and a symbol of treason. During his time alive, Avni Rustemi and many others thought of him as a traitor to the Albanian people, and on the 13th of June 1920, he assassinated Essad Toptani.

Jusuf was a Miller, and some time in his life he became acquainted with the Toptani family, possibly during the time of Essad's rule as prime minister. He must have already been working for them prior to the murder of Essad Pasha Toptani and was a servant of Mr. Essad Toptani, and with the news of his death, the Toptani family and their loyalists alike, including Jusuf, were distressed by this news. All of Albania was aware that it was Avni Rustemi who killed Essad in Paris. Why exactly Jusuf killed Avni is not fully known; some say Zog I hired him to do it, others say the Toptani family directly. All that is known is that he was very loyal to Essad Pasha Toptani, and the plan to kill Avni was formulated only a few days before he committed the crime.

Jusuf, at 15:55 on the 20th of April 1924, on Durrës Road in Tirana saw Avni Rustemi and shot him twice with his revolver. Avni shot at him back, but all his shots missed. Avni was heavily wounded for two days and died of the wounds inflicted on him by Jusuf Reçi.

Jusuf Reçi died in 1947 from execution by the communist party of Albania.
