= Era Fascista =

Calendar era used in Fascist Italy

The Era Fascista ("Fascist Era") was a calendar era used in Fascist Italy, introduced in 1926 (Anno IV) and officialized in 1927 (Anno V). Each year of the Era Fascista (E.F.) was an Anno Fascista (A.F.). Day 1 of Anno I of the Era Fascista corresponded to 29 October 1922, when Mussolini became prime minister after his March on Rome.

The Era Fascista calendar was inspired by the French Republican calendar.

Era Fascista dates often consisted of the Gregorian date followed by the corresponding Era Fascista year in Roman numerals, as part of Fascist propaganda's appropriation of ancient Roman iconography. The Era Fascista year was sometimes written as "Anno XIX", "A. XIX", or marked "E.F." The calendar was intended to replace the "bourgeois" Gregorian calendar in Italian public life to the extent that, in 1939, newspapers were forbidden to write about New Year's Day.

The tenth anniversary of the March on Rome, Anno X, was called the Decennale (evoking the ancient Roman Decennalia). The propaganda centerpiece of Anno X was the Exhibition of the Fascist Revolution.

The calendar was abandoned in most of Italy with the fall of the Fascist regime in 1943 (Anno XXI), but continued to be used in the rump Republic of Salò until the death of Mussolini in April 1945 (Anno XXIII).

Many monuments built during this period in Italian history still bear Era Fascista dates.

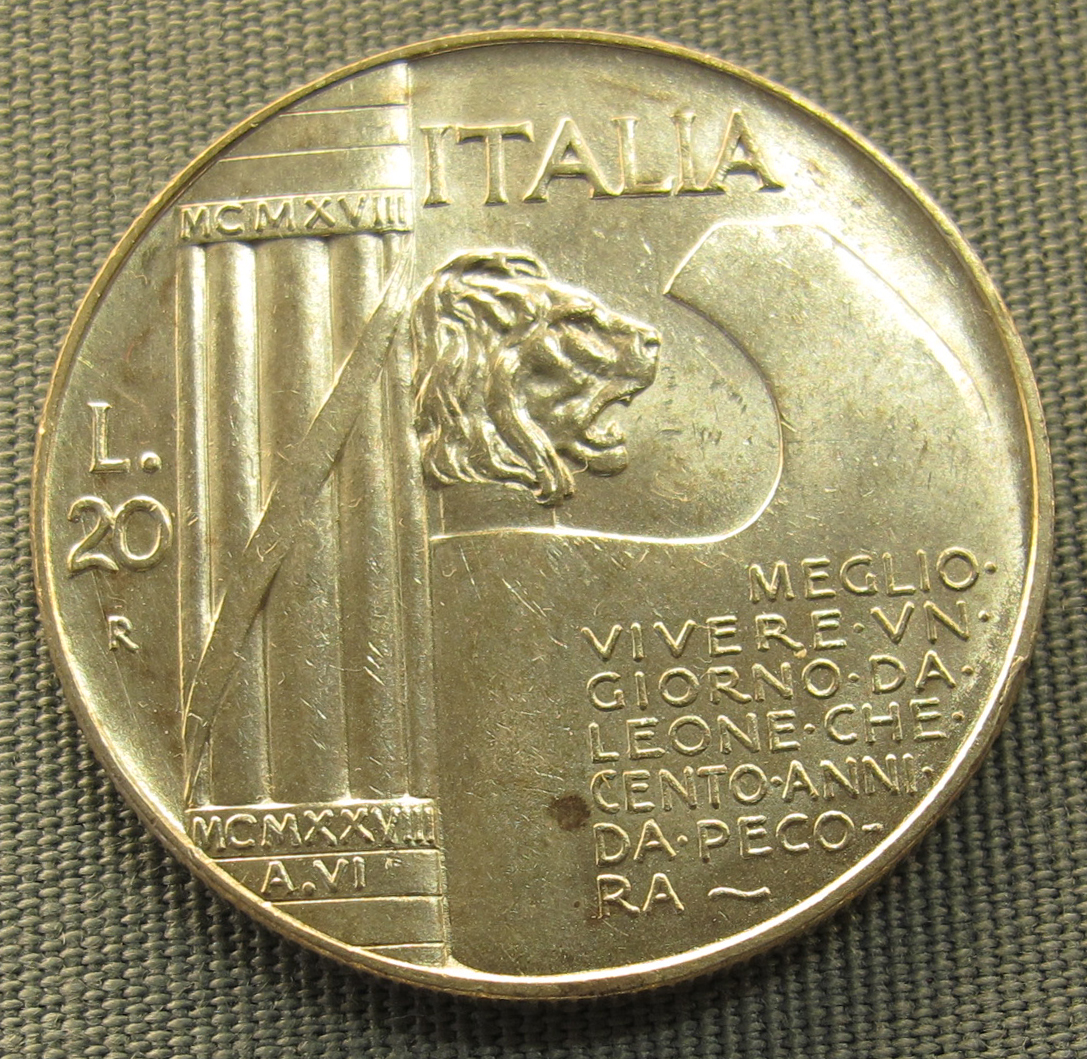
A Fascist-period 20 Italian lire coin (1928), dated MCMXXVIII A.VI

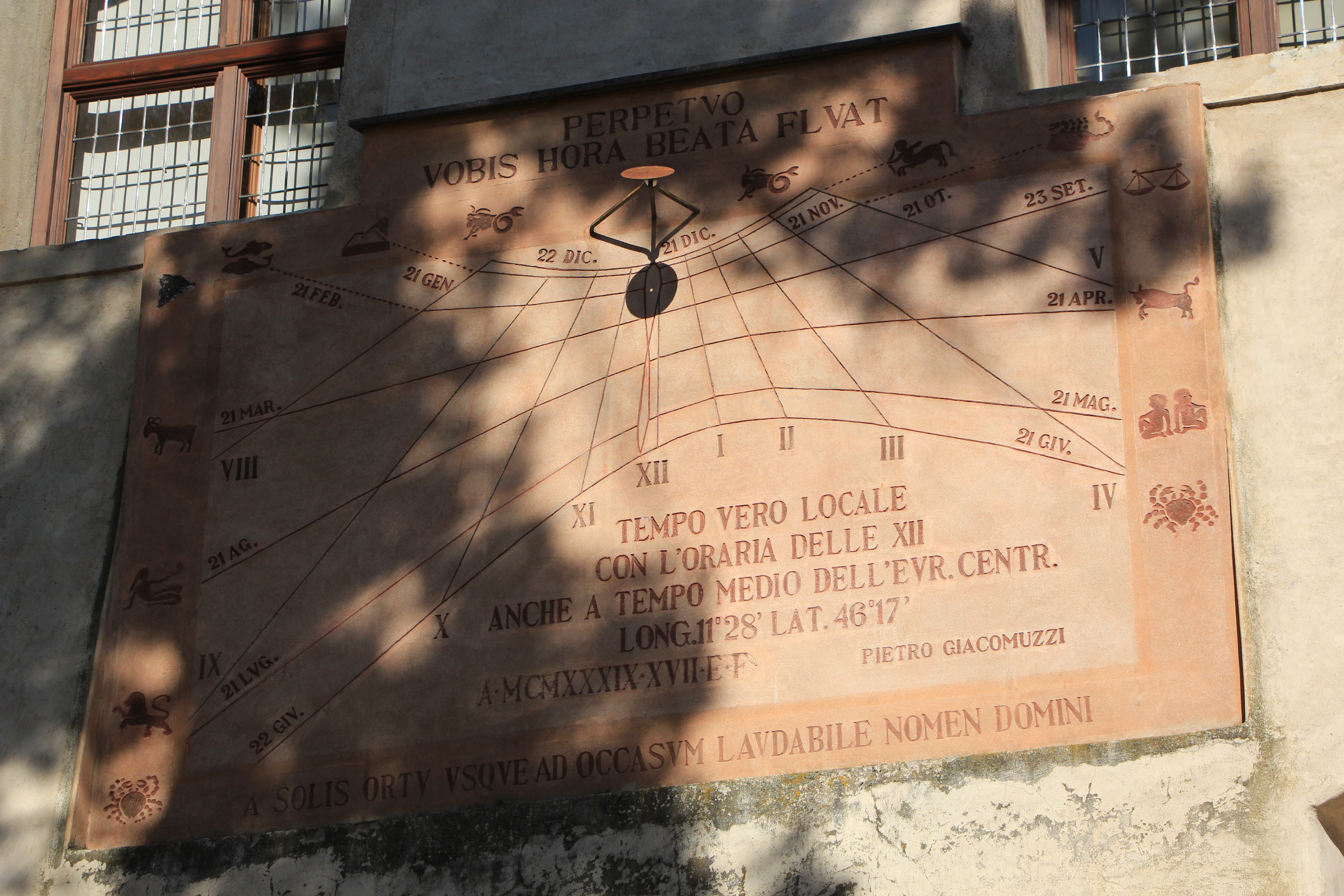
A sun dial in Cavalese, Trento, dated MCMXXXIX XVII E F

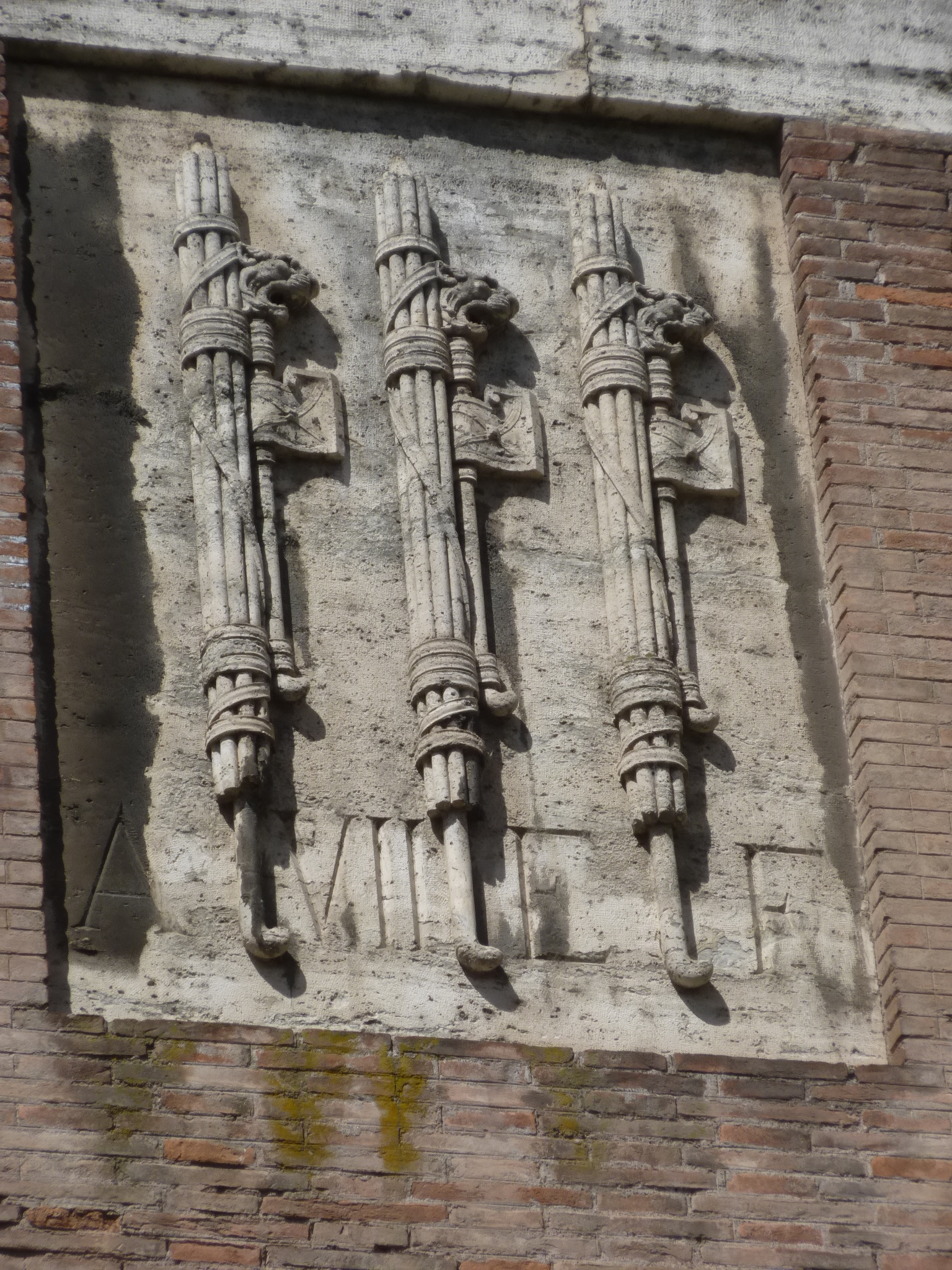
A plaque with fasces on the Theatre of Marcellus, dated A. VII E.F.

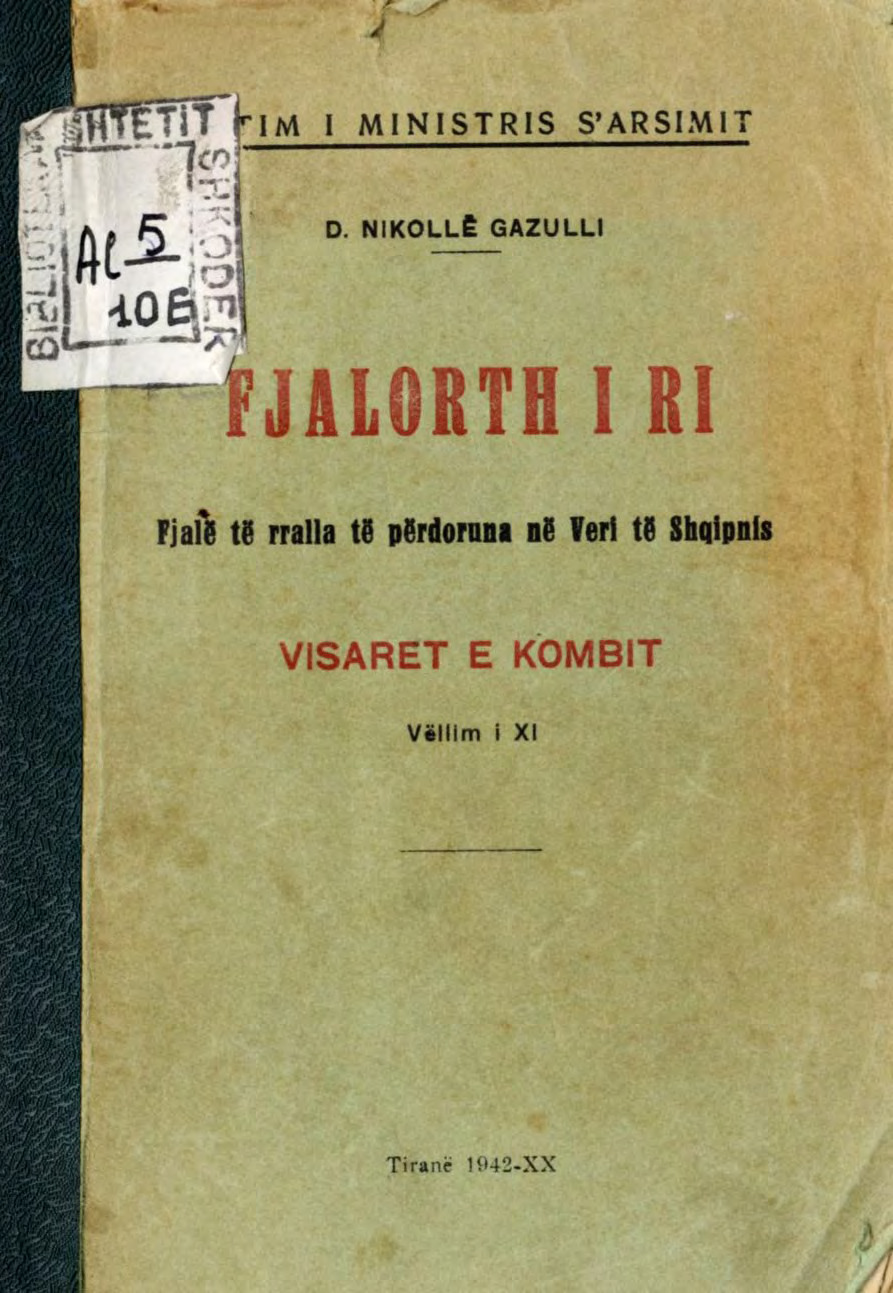
Cover of Nikollë Gazulli's dictionary during fascist rule in Albania, dated 1942-XX

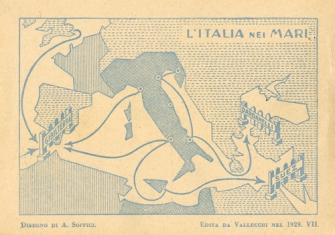
A postcard by Ardengo Soffici, dated 1929. VII
