= Paulina Shkreli =

Albanian teacher

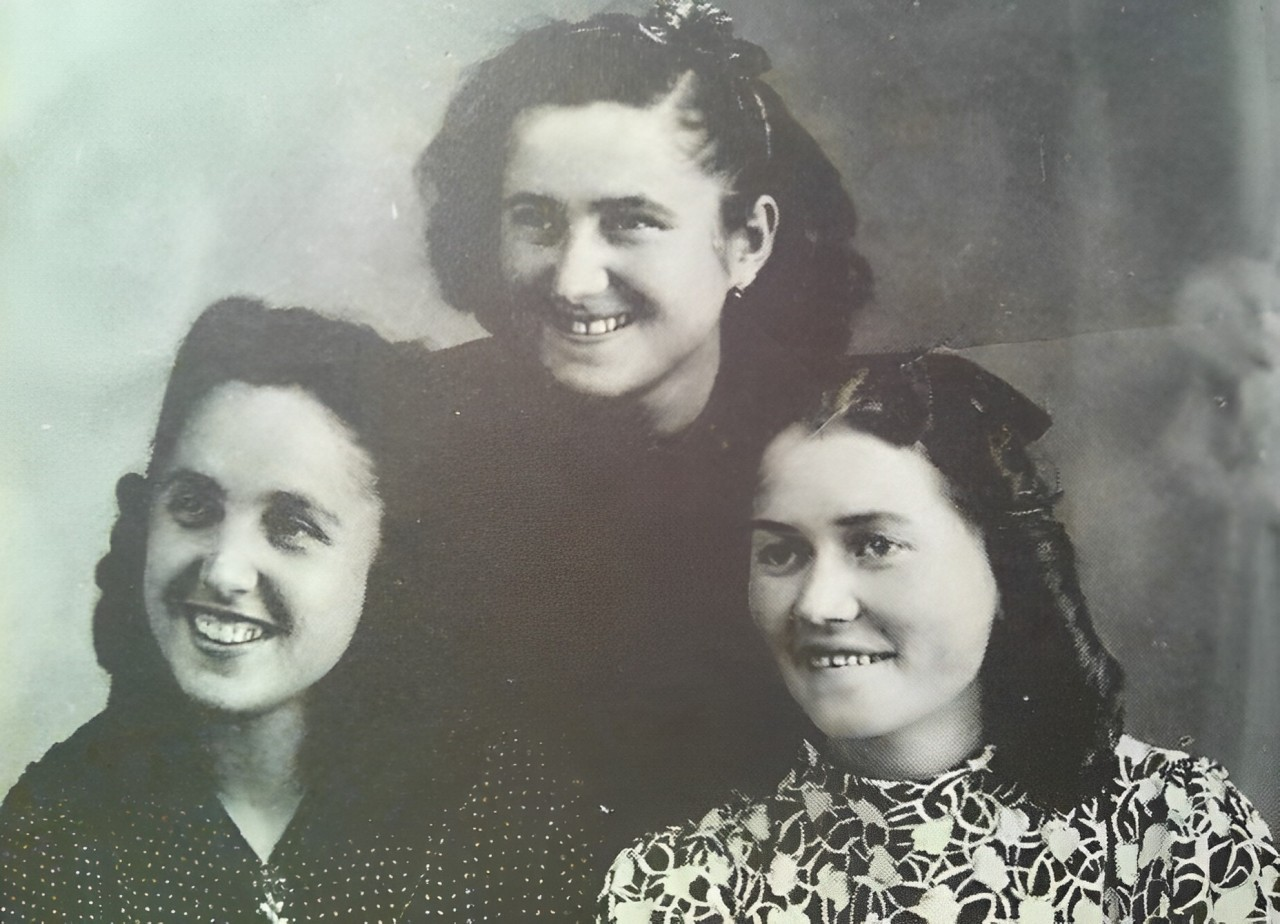
- Paulina Shkreli, Melihate Deva and Zehra Zhubi
- Born: Paulina Shkreli; 1922; Mitrovica, Kingdom of Serbs, Croats, and Slovenes
- Died: May 30, 2000 (aged 78); Prizren, Kosovo, FR Yugoslavia
- Awards: Naim Frashëri Order (posthumously)

Paulina Shkreli (1922 – 30 May 2000), also known as Lina Shkreli, was an Albanian teacher from Kosovo, who laid the foundations of Albanian education in Kosovo during 1941–1944.

== Biography ==
Born in Mitrovica in 1922, in the well-known family of Simon Shkreli, she completed her primary school in Mitrovica. In the summer of 1942 she successfully completed the pedagogical course at the Normal School Sami Frashër in Prishtina. Immediately after the opening of the primary school Skënderbeg in Mitrovica she began teaching together with the teachers: Bedri Gjinaj, Melihate Deva-Nura, Ali Gaxha, Ahmet Efendia, Jorgji Shuteriqi and many others. She worked as a teacher, thus laying the foundations of Albanian education in this environment during the period 1941-1944. Paulina Shkreli together with the students and teachers of the "Skënderbeg" school and with the young people of the city, developed an intense cultural-educational and artistic activity.

The rich programs were shown not only in the municipalities that had remained in the German occupation zone (Vushtrri, Podujevë, Novi Pazar), but also in other centers. After the end of World War II, the victory of communism and the re-occupation of Kosovo, the Serbian regime imprisoned Paulina Shkreli and her two friends and collaborators, Melihate Deva and Zehra Zhubi. They were accused of inspiring young people with patriotic feelings, they were members of the Albanian Youth Organization and collaborators of Bedri Gjinaj and Abdyl Zhubi, etc.

After leaving prison, Paulina Shkreli was appointed a teacher in Gjakova. There she married the teacher Gjergj Martini, whom a year later the Yugoslav communist regime sentenced to execution, just because he was a member of the Albanian National-Democratic Organization. Shkreli died on May 30, 2000. She was buried in Prizren.

== Legacy ==
Lina Shkreli and many other teachers were recognized and publicly honored for their work in the field of education. The President of Albania, Sali Berisha, decorated her with Decree No. 811, dated 11.4.1944, for her great contributions to Albanian schools in Northern and Eastern Albania outside the political borders of the Albanian state of 1913 in the years 1941-1944. In addition, she also received posthumously the Medalja Presidenciale e Meritave by Atifete Jahjaga. Furthermore, a street in Mitrovica bears her name.
