= Doç-Rrepisht =

- Village
- Location within Albania
- Coordinates: 42°14′25″N 19°34′34″E
- Country: Albania
- County: Shkodër
- Municipality: Malësi e Madhe
- Administrative unit: Shkrel
- Time zone: UTC+1 (CET)
  - Summer (DST): UTC+2 (CEST)

Doç-Rrepisht (also known as Repisht i Poshtëm) is a settlement in the former Shkrel municipality, Shkodër County, northern Albania. At the 2015 local government reform it became part of the municipality Malësi e Madhe.
