= Lohë e Sipërme =

- Village
- Location within Albania
- Coordinates: 42°15′43″N 19°32′6″E
- Country: Albania
- County: Shkodër
- Municipality: Malësi e Madhe
- Administrative unit: Shkrel
- Time zone: UTC+1 (CET)
  - Summer (DST): UTC+2 (CEST)

Lohë e Sipërme is a settlement in the former Shkrel municipality, Shkodër County, northern Albania. At the 2015 local government reform it became part of the municipality Malësi e Madhe.
