= Shllaku =

Region in northern Albania; historic Albanian tribe

Shllak (Albanian definite form: Shllaku), is a region of Northern Albania, east of Shkodër whose territory is synonymous with the historic Albanian tribe of the same name. Members of Shllaku tribe are Catholics. The region corresponds to today's Shllak Municipality near Shkodër.

== Geography ==
The historical region of Shllaku corresponds to Shllak. The tribal region borders the Shkreli, Dushmani and Toplana tribal regions to the north.

== Names ==
The name Shllaku is documented as Scelau in a 1641 report submitted by the Albanian bishop Frang Bardhi to the Congregation of the Propaganda Fide in Rome. The form Scelaku is recorded in 1703 by Vicko Zmajevic, the Catholic Archbishop of Bar. The toponym is possibly derived from a saint's name, perhaps Saint Luke.

== Origins ==
According to tradition, the Toplana, the ancestor of Shllaku as well as of the Gashi can trace their lineage back to 1450 when they arrived in their present area from the territory where now Vasojevići is located in Montenegro. Vasojevići tradition traces their origin from around Foča in modern Bosnia and Herzegovina and moved around 1450 to their present location. Thus, Nopcsa and others have arrived to the conclusion that at some point Vasojevići drove southwards the ancestral group of Toplana around this time.

According to tradition, recorded by Nopcsa, the tribal ancestor was named "Can Gabeti", one of four brothers (the others were the founder of the Gashi, Toplana and Megulla). Gabeti, said to have been an Orthodox Christian from Montenegro, came across the original native population who were the ancestors of the Kolë Pep Fura family and whose last male descendant died about 1900. The original population of Shllaku was called Lorehic and is said to be related to the family of the same name in Guri i Zi on the plain of Shkodër.

Shlaku tribe consists of about three hundred houses, all Christian. It is an offshoot of the tribe of Toplana. A third of it lives by charcoal-burning, the others by keeping goats. There is very little cultivable land.

— Durham, Edith (1909). "High Albania". London: Edward Arnold.

== History ==
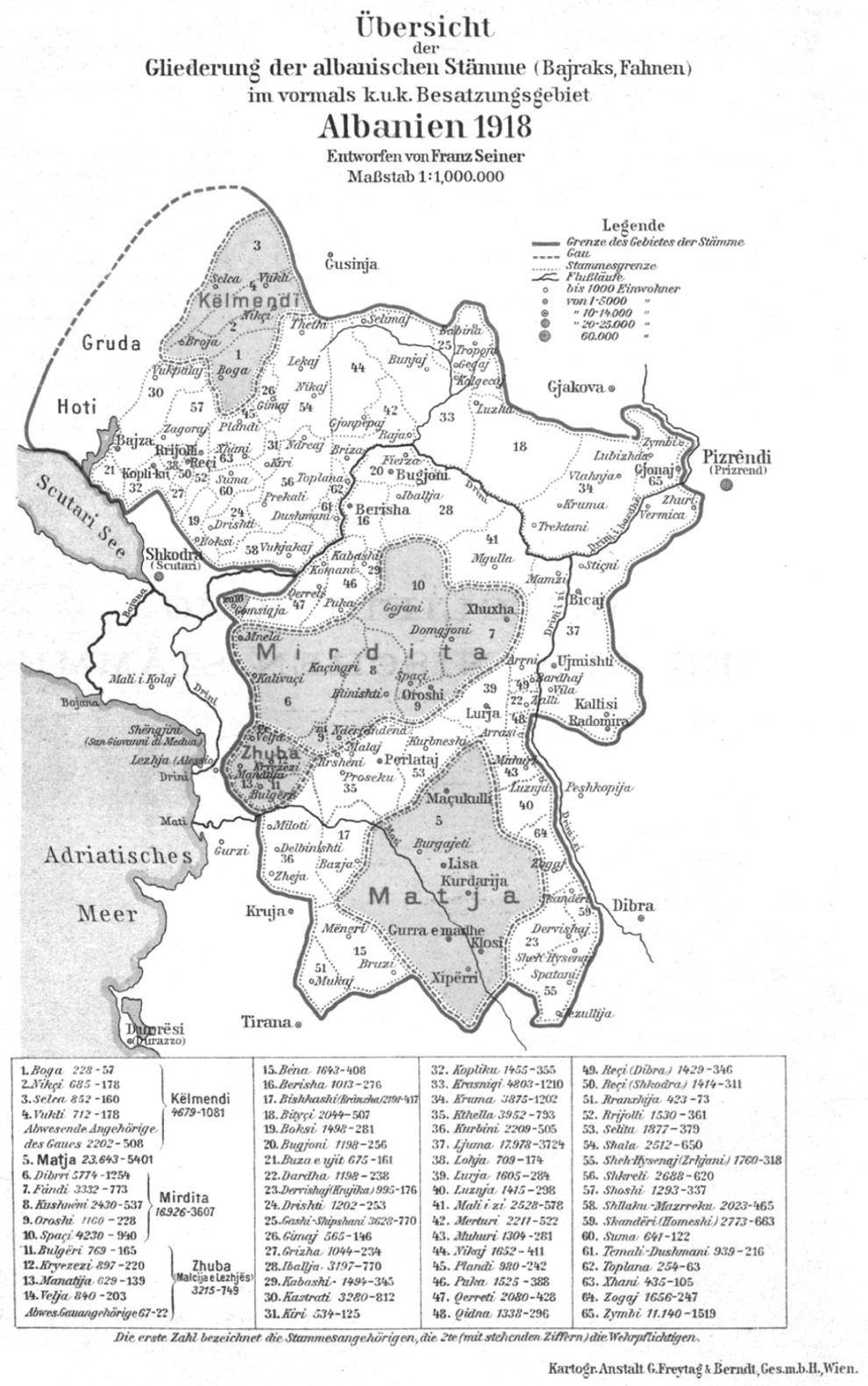
Albanians bayraks as of 1918, Shllaku covers section 58.

In 1877 Ottoman soldiers from Shllaku attacked Montenegro.

In 1922 this tribe had a population of 1,500.

== Notable people ==
- Bernardin Palaj - Franciscan cleric

== See also ==
- Kastrati
- Tribes of Albania
- Shllak Municipality
