= Lohë e Poshtme =

Lohe e Poshtme
- Village
- Location within Albania
- Coordinates: 42°13′51″N 19°29′20″E
- Country: Albania
- County: Shkodër
- Municipality: Malësi e Madhe
- Administrative unit: Qendër

Population
  - Total: 573
- Time zone: UTC+1 (CET)
  - Summer (DST): UTC+2 (CEST)

Lohe e Poshtme is a settlement in the former Qendër municipality, Shkodër County, northern Albania. At the 2015 local government reform it became part of the municipality Malësi e Madhe. It has a population of 573.
