= Vrith =

- Village
- Location within Albania
- Coordinates: 42°19′58″N 19°32′29″E
- Country: Albania
- County: Shkodër
- Municipality: Malësi e Madhe
- Administrative unit: Shkrel
- Time zone: UTC+1 (CET)
  - Summer (DST): UTC+2 (CEST)

Vrith is a settlement in the former Shkrel municipality, Shkodër County, northern Albania. At the 2015 local government reform it became part of the municipality Malësi e Madhe.

== Sources ==
- Lauria, Antonio; Flora, Valbona; Guza, Kamela (2020). Five Albanian Villages : guidelines for a Sustainable Tourism Development through the Enhancement of the Cultural Heritage (PDF). Firenze University Press. ISBN 978-88-5518-174-7. Archived from the original (PDF) on 2021-11-21.
