= Bedri Gjinaj =

Albanian nationalist (1913–1945)

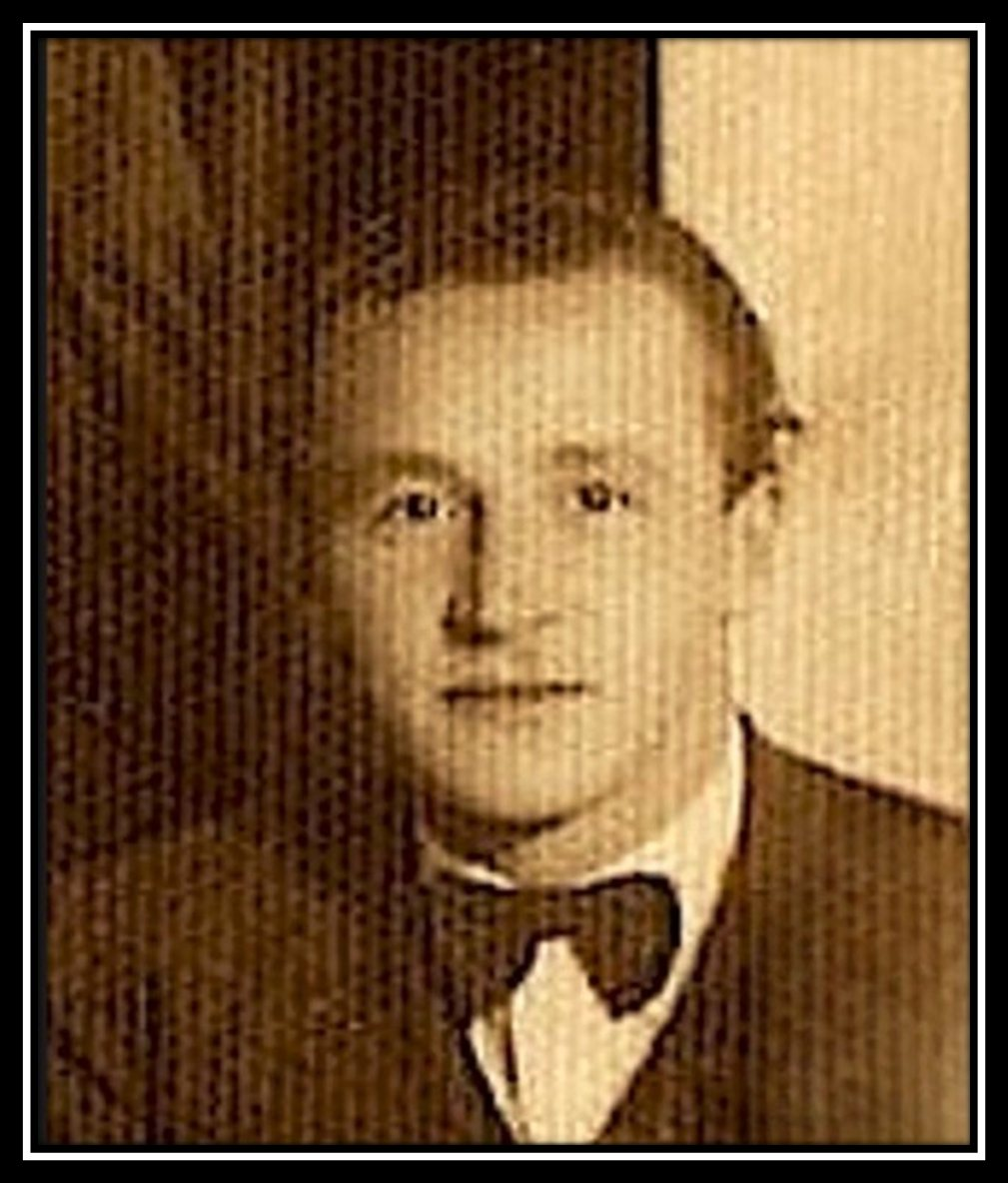
- Bedri Gjinaj
- Born: Bedri Gjinaj; 21 May 1913; Mitrovica, Kosovo vilayet, Ottoman Empire
- Died: May 1945 (aged 31–32); Mitrovica, DF Yugoslavia
- Awards: Urdhri dhe Medalja "Naim Frashëri" (posthumously)

Bedri Gjinaj (21 May 1913 – May 1945) was an Albanian teacher and nationalist from Kosovo, who served as the secretary of the Second League of Prizren in 1943.

He was murdered by the Yugoslav regime in May 1945.

== Legacy ==
Gjinaj is regarded as a national hero by many ethnic Albanians. Streets in Mitrovica and Pristina and a primary school in Mitrovica bear his name.

== Sources ==
- Hajrizi, Fazli (2014). Bedri Gjinaj- mësues dhe atdhetar i shquar ( monografi). Shtëpia Botuese Libri Shkollor. ISBN 978-9951079976.
