= Bogë, Kosovo =

Village in Pejë, Kosovo

Bogë
- Village
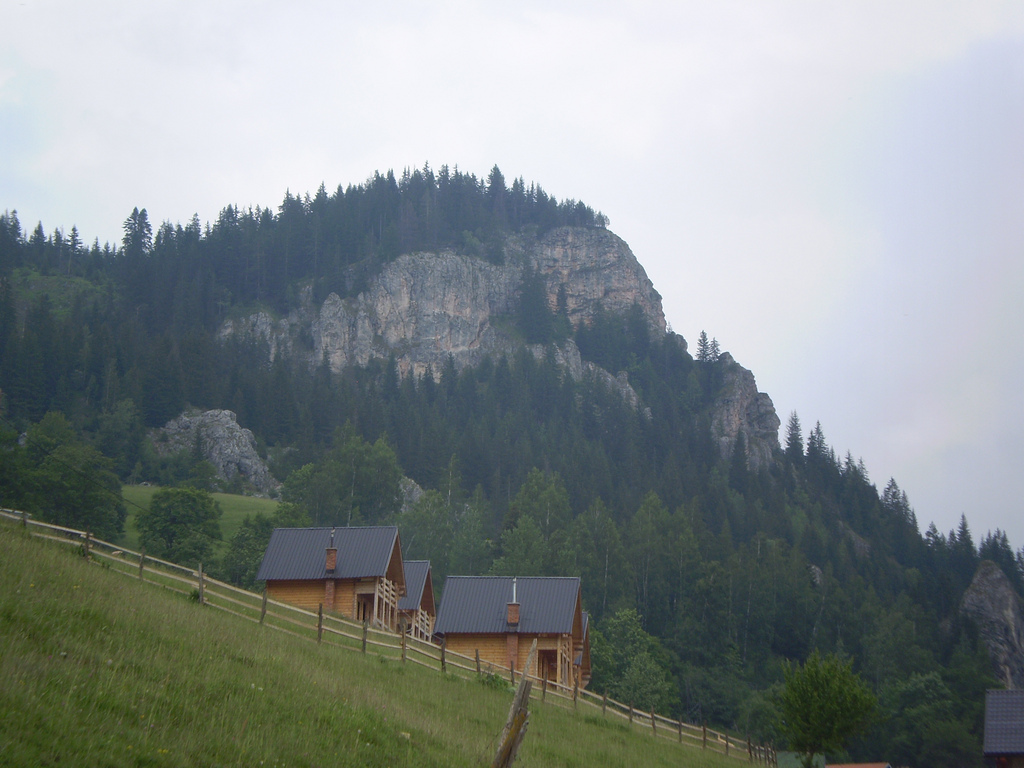
- Ski resort of Bogë

- Location in Kosovo Bogë (Balkans)
- Country: Kosovo
- District: Pejë
- Municipality: Pejë
- Elevation: 1,300 m (4,300 ft)

Population (2024)
  - Total: 161
- Time zone: UTC+1 (CET)
  - Summer (DST): UTC+2 (CEST)

Bogë is a small mountainous village and also a holiday resort village in western Kosovo. Bogë is located in the Bjeshkët e Nemuna mountain range on an altitude of about 1,300–1,400 metres (4,300–4,600 ft). Nearby the village is located the peak of Hajla at 2,403 metres (7,884 ft) and the Lumbardhi i Pejës river which has its source not far from the village.

The name Bogë may have its origin from the Proto-Indo-European root *bhoĝ-, meaning "the running water".

== Gallery ==
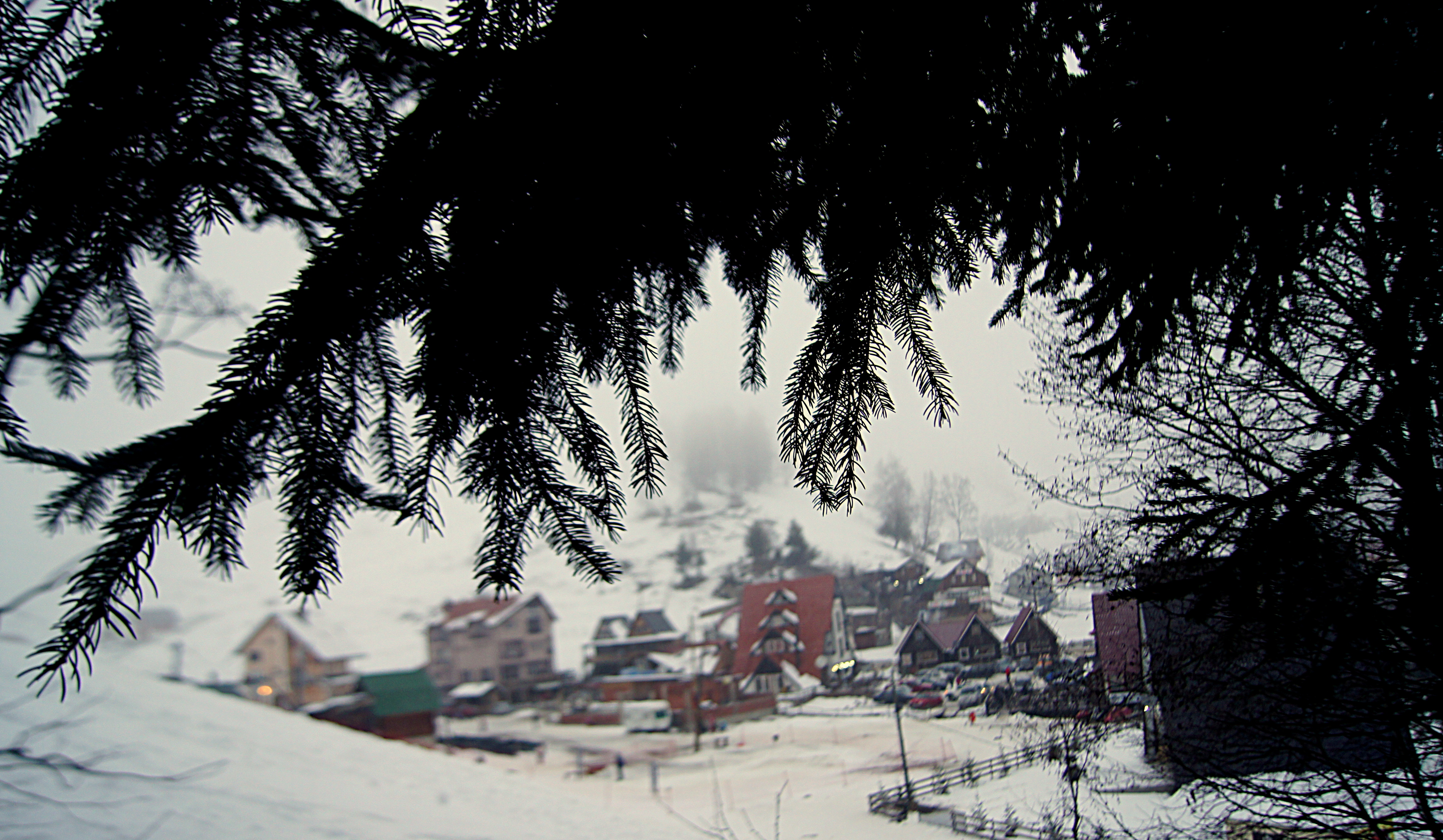
Ski village

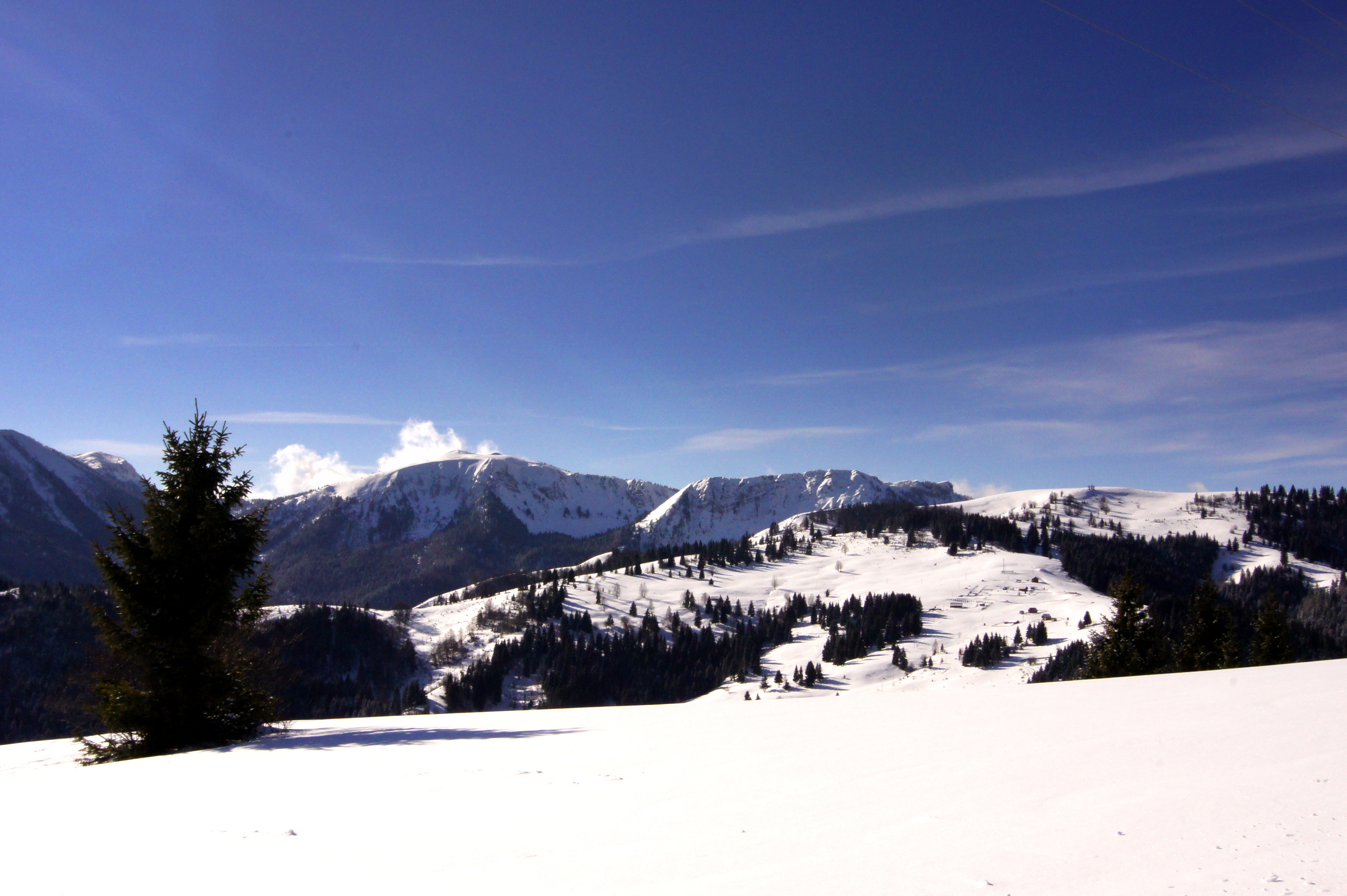
Bogë in winter

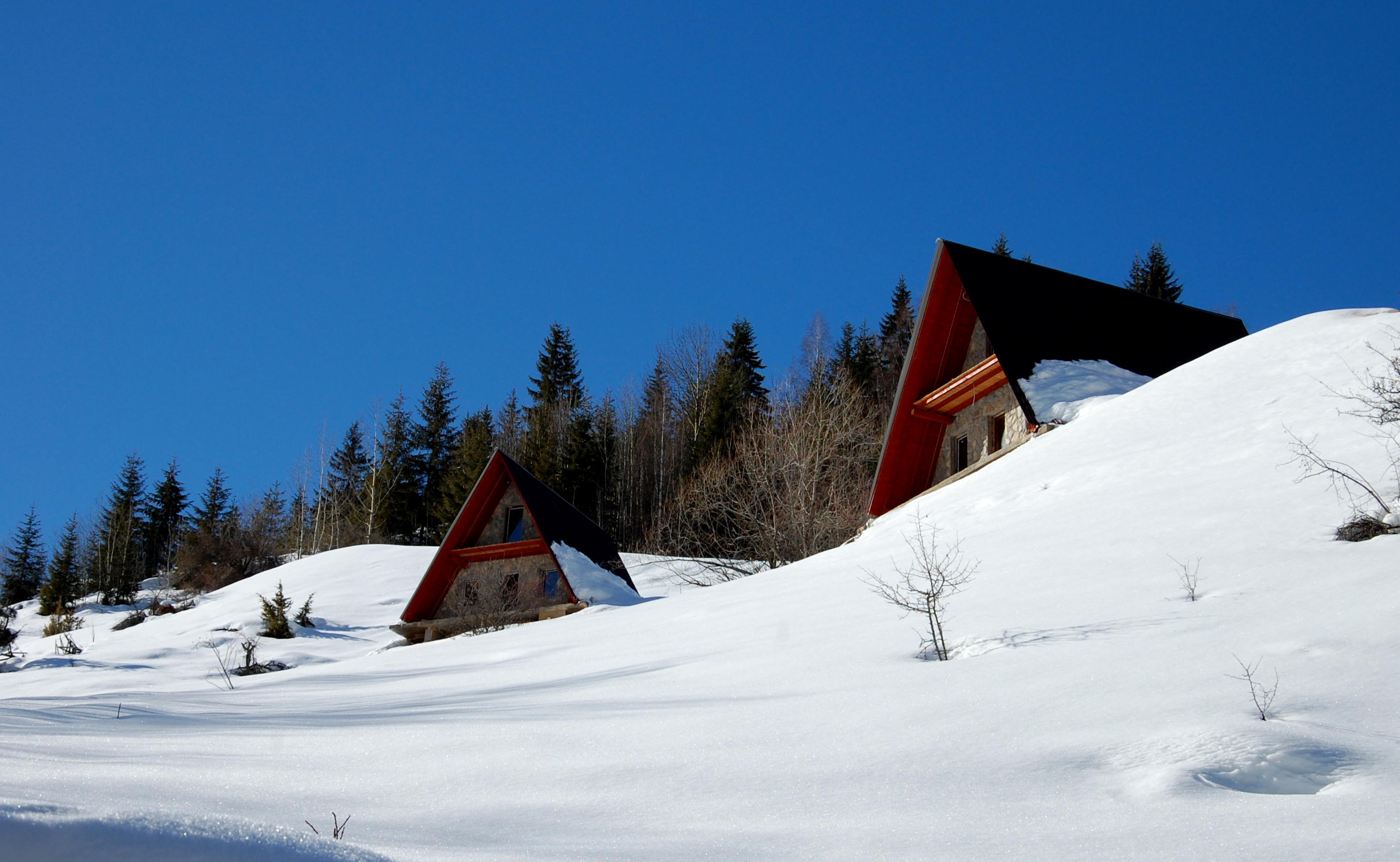
Holiday chalet in Bogë
