= Reç =

- Village
- Location within Albania
- Coordinates: 42°14′6″N 19°32′4″E
- Country: Albania
- County: Shkodër
- Municipality: Malësi e Madhe
- Administrative unit: Shkrel

Population
  - Total: 1,000
- Time zone: UTC+1 (CET)
  - Summer (DST): UTC+2 (CEST)

Reç (also known as Reç i Poshtëm) is a settlement in the former Shkrel municipality, Shkodër County, northern Albania. At the 2015 local government reform it became part of the municipality Malësi e Madhe.

== Notable people ==
- Bekim Balaj, footballer
- Elseid Hysaj, footballer
- Jusuf Reçi, by descent, Murderer of Avni Rustemi.
