= Shkrel =

- Administrative unit
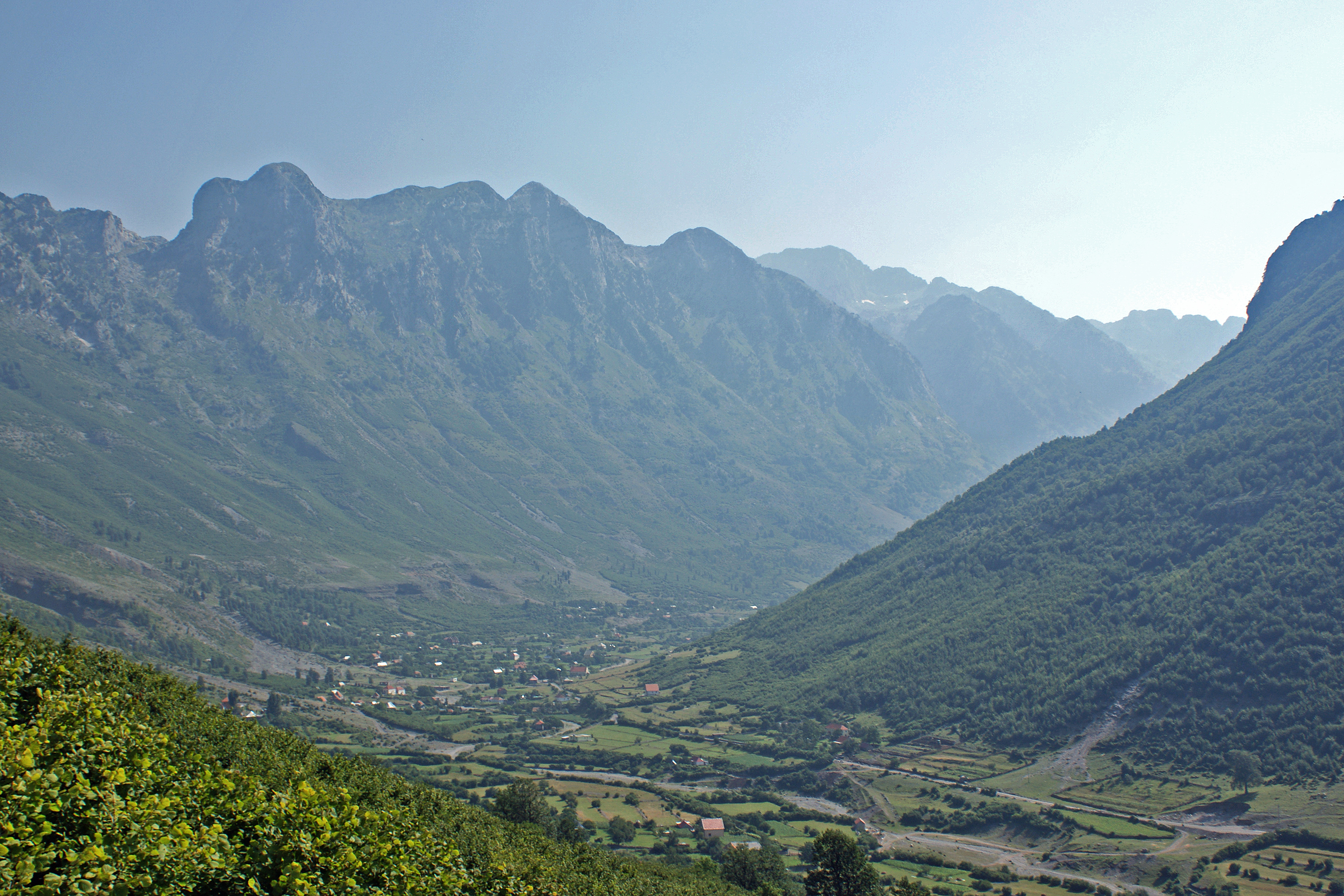
- Boga village

- Location within Albania
- Coordinates: 42°18′N 19°32′E
- Country: Albania
- County: Shkodër
- Municipality: Malësi e Madhe
  - Administrative unit: 297.2 km^{2} (114.7 sq mi)

Population (2011)
  - Administrative unit: 3,520
  - Administrative unit density: 11.8/km^{2} (30.7/sq mi)
- Time zone: UTC+1 (CET)
  - Summer (DST): UTC+2 (CEST)
- Website: www.komunashkrel.com

Shkrel is a former municipality in the Shkodër County, northwestern Albania. At the 2015 local government reform it became a subdivision of the municipality Malësi e Madhe. The population at the 2011 census was 3,520. Since 2015, Shkrel is part of the Shkreli Regional Nature Park.

== Settlements ==
There are 12 settlements within Shkrel:

- Bogë
- Bzhetë
- Bzhetë-Makaj
- Dedaj
- Doç-Rrepisht
- Kokë-Papaj
- Lohe e Sipërme
- Qafë-Gradë
- Reç
- Vrith
- Vuç-Kurtaj
- Zagorë (Zagorë-Isufaj and Zagorë-Ndrecaj)
