= Bogë, Albania =

Bogë
- Village
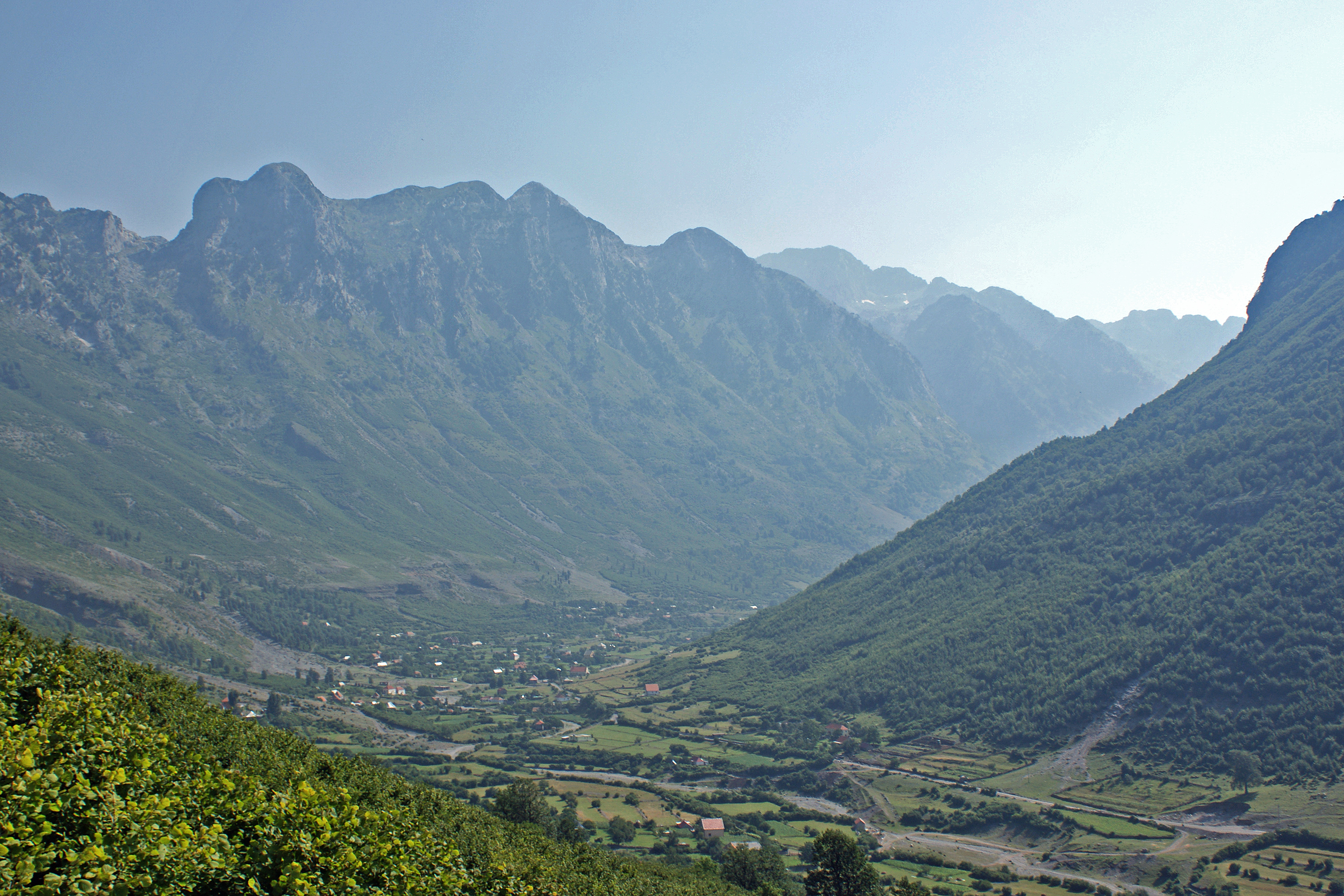
- View of the village

- Location within Albania
- Coordinates: 42°23′53″N 19°38′44″E
- Country: Albania
- County: Shkodër
- Municipality: Malësi e Madhe
- Administrative unit: Shkrel
- Time zone: UTC+1 (CET)
  - Summer (DST): UTC+2 (CEST)

Bogë (Albanian definite form: Boga) is a village in northern Albania. It was in the former Shkrel municipality, but following local government reform in 2015, it became part of the municipality Malësi e Madhe. Bogë was a historical bajrak of Kelmendi tribe in the north headwaters of Prroni i thate, bounded to the north by lands that were inhabited by the Shala; to the south by land inhabited by the Ducaj. The village was attached to Shkrel despite originally being part of Kelmendi. The village consisted of 75 families in 1908 according to Edith Durham, all of which were Catholics. The village is divided in two sections, consisting of the Preçaj and Kolaj neighborhoods.

== Etymology ==
The etymology of Boga is debated. One hypothesis suggests that it is derived from Albanian bokë, meaning "barren/rocky farmland" or "mountain side". Another view argues that it may be a derivative of Slavic bog ("god").

== Culture ==
The village has a church (Kisha e Bogës), located on 920m above sea level.

== Demographic history ==
In 1908, English anthropologist Edith Durham registered 75 families in Boga, all of which were Catholics, she reported this in her 1909 book High Albania.

== Notable people ==
- Aleksandër Sirdani (1903-1948), Jesuit pastor, folklorist, and ethnographer
- Marin Sirdani (1887-1962), pastor, educator, and historian
