= Kuči (tribe) =

Historical tribe and region in eastern Montenegro

Kuči (Montenegrin: Кучи, Kuči; Albanian: Kuçi, pronounced [ˈkutʃi]) is a tribe of Albanian origin, historically located in modern central and eastern Montenegro (Brda region), north-east of Podgorica, extending along the border with Albania. Processes of Slavicisation during the Ottoman era and onwards facilitated ethno-linguistic shifts within much of the community. As such, people from the Kuči today largely identify themselves as Montenegrins and Serbs, with a minority still identifying as Albanians. In other areas such as the Sandžak, many Muslim descendants of the Kuči today identify as Bosniaks.

The Kuči first appear in historical records in 1330 as a brotherhood from an Albanian katun near Lake Shkodra under the jurisdiction of the Dečani Monastery. The region itself is first mentioned in 1485 as a nahiyah of the Sandjak of Shkodra. Over time, several waves of settlers came to populate the region and form the historical community of Kuči. The region is known for its resistance against Ottoman rule and its key role in the creation of modern Montenegro. Until the 17th century, the Kuči region was equally Orthodox and Catholic. Today, it is mostly Orthodox except for the Catholic community of Koja. Muslim converts appear since 1485. In the 17th and 18th centuries, both voluntarily and non-voluntarily many people from the pleme began to settle in the Plav-Gusinje, Rožaje and the wider Sandžak region. Many of their descendants identify as Muslim Bosniaks.

The history of the people of Kuči represents the diversity of the area and its location at the crossroads between different cultures and religions. As such, alongside Marko Miljanov (1833–1901), a national hero of Montenegro who led the tribe in the Montenegrin-Ottoman Wars in 1861–62 and 1876–78, people of Kuči ancestry include and Jakup Ferri (1832–1879), a national hero of Albania who fought against Miljanov's annexation of his home territory Plav to Montenegro. Modern individuals include Momir Bulatović, a Montenegrin politician and the first President of the Republic of Montenegro and Fahrudin Radončić, a Bosniak politician and former Minister of Security of Bosnia and Herzegovina.

== Name ==
=== Attestation ===
The name appears in several Albanian inhabited territories, including toponyms in Shkodër, Tirana, Berat, Vlorë and Korçë, as well as anthroponyms and toponyms among the medieval Albanian communities of the Peloponnese, for example the village of Kuçi (modern Chelidoni, known until 1955 as Koutsi) is recorded as an Albanian settlement (cemā'at-i Arnavudān) in 1460–3. According to Giuseppe Valentini, also the Arbëreshë surname Cuccia directly corresponds to the tribal name of the Kuči. Valentini makes further connections to the Albanian Kuçi of medieval Greece, noting that the Sicilo-Arbëreshë Cuccia family descends from a certain Pietro Cuccia who arrived from Greece in 1467. The surname appears at least 19 times among Albanian stradioti recorded between 1482 and 1547, and Valentini notes various toponyms connected to the tribal name across Albania and Arvanite settlements in Greece. According to the tradition of the Berisha tribe, the Old Kuči is called Berisha i Kuq (Red Berisha) as opposed to Berisha i Bardh (White Berisha), which is used for Berisha of Pukë, Mërturi and a part of Piperi that traces its origin from Berisha.

=== Etymology ===
The etymology of Kuči (Albanian: Kuçi) is unclear.

Many scholars have adopted the view that the etymology of the name is from Albanian kuq (Gheg Albanian [/kut͡ʃ/], kuç in the Albanian alphabet) "red", ultimately from Latin coccaeus evolved through Albanian phonetic changes. It was first proposed by Gustav Meyer and adopted by Pavle Ivić, Petar Šimunović and many others.

Alternative etymologies from Albanian sources include kuç ("puppy, doggie") suggested by Biris (1998), and kuci ("place of high altitude, summit, steep high rock") suggested by Sarris (1928) and Fourikis (1929). Stanišić proposes a derivation from Romanian cuci ("hills"), from a similar source to Albanian kuci ("place of high altitude"). Idriz Ajeti and Eqrem Çabej considered kuq improbable and proposed a derivation from kuç ("earthen pot", figuratively "valley") as a geographical reference to valley dwellers as the name is widespread in Albanian-speaking groups.

Aleksandar Loma suggests a potential, albeit unclear, connection to the toponym Kučevo for which he proposes a number of Slavic (f.e., *kučь meaning "Eurasian bittern", *kuti meaning "smith") and non-Slavic etymologies; as well as connections to Polish toponyms Kucz and Kuczów.

== Geography ==
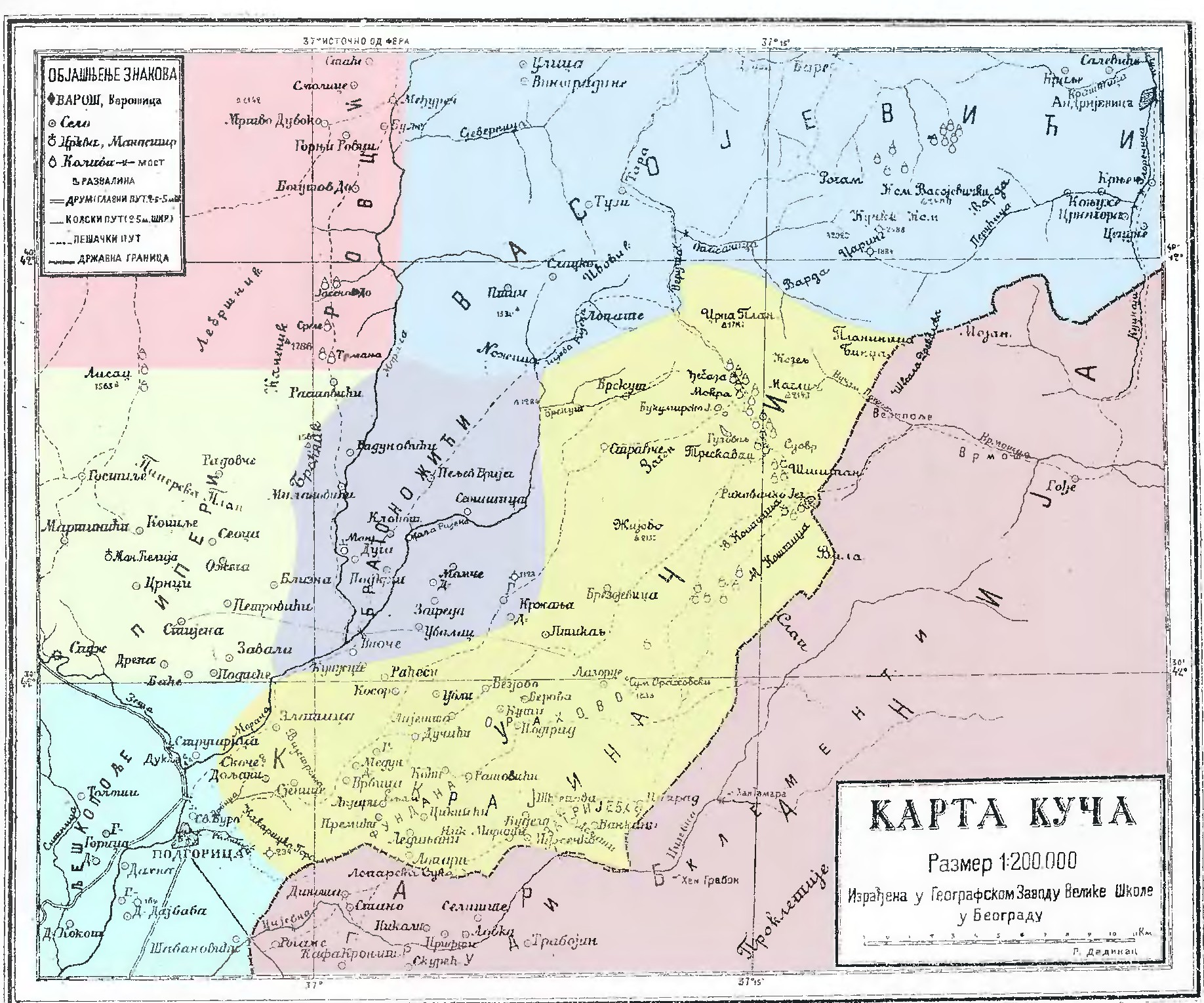
Map of Kuči (in yellow) in the late 19th century

The Kuči region is within the municipality of Podgorica and comprises almost all of eastern Podgorica, with the exception of Koći, which is part of the Tuzi Municipality. The unofficial Kuči centre is the Ubli village, which had 227 inhabitants in the 2011 Montenegrin census and houses several institutions like a culture hall, the "Đoko Prelević" elementary school, a hospital, a police station and a former fabric factory. Ubli is situated in Upper Kuči (Montenegrin: Gornji Kuči) and includes the villages of Prelevići, Pavićevići, Živkovići, Kostrovići and Rajovići. The other villages of Upper Kuči are Medun, Orahovo, Bezjovo, Cvilin, Fundina, Koći, Kržanja, Kosor, Liješta, Dučići, Vrbica, Donje Stravče, Gornje Stravče, Zaugao, Brskut, Zagreda, Momče, Ubalac and Raći. Lower Kuči (Montenegrin: Donji Kuči) comprises the localities of Doljani, Murtovina, Stara Zlatica and Zlatica.

The Kuči region itself can be divided into two major historical sub-regions:

- Old Kuči (Staro Kuči), Orthodox sub-tribe, which celebrates the Slava of Mitrovdan
- Drekalovići (Novo Kuči), Orthodox sub-tribe, which celebrates the Slava of Nikoljdan

An area that is also considered part of the wider Kuči region is that of Koja, a Catholic Albanian tribe. It became part of Montenegro in 1880 and it includes the settlements of Koći and Fundina. The region of Koja stands between Triepshi in the south and Kuči proper in the north. The people of Koja are referred to as Kojanë.

Some villages stand between the Kuči sub-regions. For example, the village of Orahovo is located between Old Kuči and Koja. Other settlements that were once part of one Kuči tribal region moved over time to other regions.

== History ==
=== Origins ===
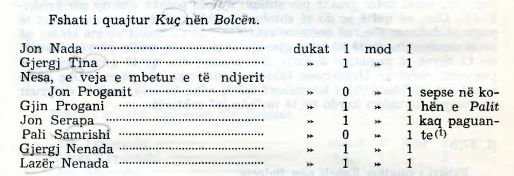
Village of Kuç, Shkodër, Albania in 1416–7

Albanian in origin, Kuči underwent a process of gradual cultural integration into the neighbouring Slavic population.

The Kuči are first attested to in 1330, in the second and third charters of the Dečani chrysobulls. (Note: In fact, Miloš Blagojević concluded that the third charter must have been written between 1343 and 1345.) There, a certain Petar Kuč (Albanian: Pjetër Kuçi) is recorded, an individual from the Albanian katun (Montenegrin: Katun Arbanasa), considered to have been the leader of the Kuči brotherhood. Contrary to the Vlach katuns mentioned in the charters, no indication is given on the location of the Albanian katun, however Branislav Djurdjev proposed that it must have been located in Zeta.

Kuči is mentioned again in the Venetian cadaster of 1416–7 of Shkodra, where the village of "Kuç" (Kuč), is listed as a small settlement of eight households near the city itself, headed by a Jon Nada. Two other heads of households are sons of Nenad, Gjergj (Giergi in the original document) and Lazër (Lazzaro). A person married into the village is Jon Progani, who was married to Nesa (a diminutive of the name Nenada). His son, Gjin Progani was also a household head as were Jon Serapa and Gjergj Tina and Pali Samrishi. They paid one ducat per household in taxes to the Venetian governor of Scutari. Members of this brotherhood also lived in other villages in the area like in Shurdhani, where three out of six households were from Kuçi. The region on the eastern shore of Lake Shkodra and the parishes of Zeta became the territory where the Kuči, along with other communities, such as the Bitidosi and Bushati would eventually migrate and settle in.

In 1455 the Kuči, who some scholars speculate may not have fully territorialized as a tribe, took part in an assembly alongside 50 other tribes of the Upper Zeta region. As a result of this assembly, the Lord of Zeta Stefan Crnojević was granted the consent and authority to sign an agreement with the Republic of Venice, according to which Zeta was placed under Venetian jurisdiction; albeit under the condition that the Metropolitan of Zeta would not be subordinated to the Catholic Church.

=== Ottoman ===
In the Ottoman defter of the Sanjak of Scutari in 1485, Kuči appears as a nahiye for the first time in its modern location. At this point, the nahiye of Kuči comprised communities that later formed two different administrative units and bajraks: Kuči and Triepshi. The total number of households in the eight settlements of the nahiya were 253. These (with household numbers in brackets) were: Pantalesh (110), Brokina (12), Bardhani (25), Radona (55), Bankeq (11), Stani (24), Bytidosi (11), Llazorçi (5). Llazorçi was a settlement of another small tribe, the Lazori who appear as part of the Albanian katun in 1330. By 1485, they had moved northwards with the Kuči brotherhoods. Bankeq and a part of Bytidosi are related with the historical region of Triepshi. In terms of anthroponymy the demographics of the area showed a cohabitation of Albanian and Slavic names. In the 253 households, 105 households heads had Albanian names, 53 had mixed Albanian-Slavic names and 91 had Slavic names. About 2/3 of the Slavic anthroponymy (59 households) was concentrated in two settlements, Radona and Stani. Radona also had about 1/5 of the mixed Slavic Orthodox-Albanian anthroponymy and it was the only settlement of Kuči in 1485 where Muslim converts lived (5/55 households).

In the 1497 defter, it had 338 households in eleven settlements including new or renamed settlements like Pavlovići, Petrovići, Lješovići (Leshoviq), Lopari, Banjovići and Koći (Koja). This increase by 85 households in a few years represents a wave of refugees and other communities that settled in the area as the Ottomans were consolidating their power base. Pavlovići and Banjovići, which represent more than half of the new households have a predominantly Slavic Orthodox anthroponymy. Koći is the historical settlement of the Catholic Albanian Koja tribe that would fully form in later years. Leshoviq/Lješovići had come to the area from the Catholic Albanian Kelmendi tribe to the south of Kuči. Many of these brotherhoods no longer exist, while some of them became part of Trieshi and Koja e Kuçit.

These formed Old Kuči (Montenegrin: Starokuči), who were a community of diverse brotherhoods (clans), in relation to the Drekalovići who claimed ancestry from a single ancestor. J. Erdeljanović found, in the Old Kuči, very noticeable instances of the merging of various brotherhoods into one over time. The merging was so finalized that it was hard for him to mark off the parts of those composite brotherhoods, "even the searching in that direction was also encountered by the apprehension of said individuals". With the arrival of the Drekalovići, the old families called themselves "Old Kuči".

According to certain oral traditions and legends, the Old Kuči descend from an ancestor named Panta. In relation to this, scholars such as Djurdjev and Pulaha have asserted that this tradition is reflected in the historical record with the attestation of Pantalesh, the main settlement of the Kuči recorded in the Ottoman register of 1485. The settlement is deemed to have been named after its founder, Panta Lleshi, who likely lived during the first half of the 15th century. Furthermore, folk legends note that Panta had a number of sons among which Mara, Llesh, Pjetri, and Gjergj appear to be reflected in the Ottoman register through the surnames and patronyms of household heads. The katuns of Petrovići and Lješovići possibly branched off from the settlement of Pantalesh and were descended from Panta's sons Pjetri and Llesh.

Another wave of settlement in the mid 16th century is that of the Drekalovići, who came to form an important part of Kuči.

In the second half of the 16th century, in particular between 1560–1571, armed uprisings spread in the northern Albanian territories of Mirdita, Shkodra, Kelmendi, Kuçi, and Pipri, fighting against the Ottoman Empire that was still at its pinnacle of power. Albanian uprisings intensified – especially in the Sanjak of Scutari and Sanjak of Dukagjin – during the Battle of Lepanto in 1571 when the Porte faced the forces of the Catholic powers of the Holy League.

In a 1582/83 defter (Ottoman tax registry), the Kuči nahiya had 13 villages, belonging to the Sanjak of Scutari. Anthroponymy in the region was mixed. In the settlements of Bankeq, Bytadosa, Bardić, Lazarniči, and Lješovići, mixed Albanian-Slavic anthroponyms now predominated over typical Albanian personal names, borne by a minority of household heads. However, in the villages of Petrovići, Koći, and Brokina half of household heads bore typical Albanian anthroponyms, the other half bearing mixed Albanian-Slavic names. In contrast, typical Slavic anthroponymy dominated in Pavlovići and Radona. This period marks the time where Albanian toponymy begins to be either translated into Slavic or acquire Slavic suffixes like in the village of Bardhani that begins to appears as Bardić, and in Llazorçi which appears as Lazarniči. Administratively, the Kuči, Bratonožići and part of Plav were under the soldiers of Medun and its spahi, but the commander was not named. They were also subject to taxation, despite having some autonomy.

In 1610, the Kuči (Cucci) are mentioned by Marino Bizzi as being half Orthodox and half Catholic (la metà scismatica e l'altra latina).

In 1613, the Ottomans launched a campaign against the rebel tribes of the northern Albanian territories. In response, the tribes of the Vasojevići, Kuči, Bjelopavlići, Piperi, Kastrati, Kelmendi, Shkreli and Hoti formed a political and military union known as “The Union of the Mountains” or “The Albanian Mountains” . The leaders swore an oath of besa to resist with all their might any upcoming Ottoman expeditions, thereby protecting their self-government and disallowing the establishment of the authority of the Ottoman Spahis in the northern highlands. Their uprising had a liberating character. With the aim of getting rid of the Ottomans from the Albanian territories

In 1614 Kuči are described in terms of ethnicity and religion in 1614 by a well-informed and trusted person of the Venetians – Mariano Bolizza – who describes the Kuči as Albanian Catholics. In his report, Bolizza notes that Lale Drecalou (Lale Drekalov/Lalë Drekali) and Nico Raizcou (Niko Rajckov/Niko Raiku) were the commanders of the Catholic Albanian Kuči (Chuzzi Albanesi) which had 490 households and 1,500 men-in-arms described as very war-like and courageous. In 1614, Lale Drekalov was one of the chief participants and organizers of the assembly of Kuçi. In that assembly 44 leaders mostly from northern Albania and Montenegro took part to organize an insurrection against the Ottomans and ask for assistance by the Papacy. Gjon Renësi had undertaken the task of presenting the decisions of the assembly to the Papacy. The leaders who participated in the assembly also decided to send a proclamation to the kings of Spain and France claiming they were independent from Ottoman rule and did not pay tribute to the empire. It was followed by an assembly in Prokuplje in 1616 and another one in 1620 in Belgrade, where he appears as one of the participants. In this period they continue to appear as subjects of the Ottoman Empire.

The first half of the 17th century is marked by an important event in the religious history of Kuči. Voivode Lale Drekalov, who was a Catholic, converted to Orthodoxy in his second marriage to a relative of the voivode of the Bratonožići tribe. The main reasons that have been put forward to explain this decision include his shift in orientation of political alliances towards the Orthodox tribes of Montenegro, the influence of the Orthodox Church in the region and the increasing disappointment towards the Catholic powers in Europe that were considered to have abandoned their allies in the Balkans. Drekalov's conversion was soon followed by a gradual conversion of all Catholics of Kuči. As Francesco Bolizza notes in a letter to Cardinal Caponi in 1649, about three or four Catholic villages remained in Kuči under the jurisdiction of the Franciscan mission of Gruda. According to Historians Simo Milutinović and Dimitrije Milaković, the Catholic Kuči, Bratonožići and Drekalovići tribe has converted to Orthodoxy by Rufim Boljević.

A 1652 Franciscan report by Giacinto Sospello illustrates the final stages of the acculturation of the Kuči. Sospello writes: "I do not want to deal here with Zeta near Shestan, which is part of Montenegro, where people practice the Orthodox rites and speak the Slavic language: the local people are not part of the Albanian nation. But I will talk about four tribes, the tribes of Piperi, Bratonožići, Bjelopavlići and Kuči. Based on their outstanding fighting skills they seem to have Albanian blood, and in fact Albanians consider them to be so. However, since almost everyone applies the Orthodox rites and speaks the Slavic language, they can be considered more Slavs than Albanians."

The political alliances in Europe did not allow for a coherent strategy to emerge in assistance of a pan-Balkan coalition against the Ottomans. In 1658, in another attempt to form an anti-Ottoman coalition the seven tribes of Kuči, Vasojevići, Bratonožići, Piperi, Kelmendi, Hoti and Gruda allied themselves with the Republic of Venice, establishing the so-called "Seven-fold barjak" or "alaj-barjak.

In 1688, the Kuči, with help from Kelmendi and Piperi, destroyed the army of Süleyman Pasha twice, took over Medun and got their hands of large quantities of weapons and equipment. In the same year, the Kuči are still considered Albanian by the German historian Christoph Boethius, renowned for his studies on the Ottoman Wars.

In 1689, an uprising broke out in Piperi, Rovca, Bjelopavlići, Bratonožići, Kuči and Vasojevići, while at the same time an uprising broke out in Prizren, Peja, Pristina and Skopje, and then in Kratovo and Kriva Palanka in October (Karposh's Rebellion).

In 1699, the Kuçi appeared for the most part to have converted to the Orthodox religion, while a smaller part, the Triepshi, continued to preserve the Catholic faith, although both Kuçi groups were allies (confederati).

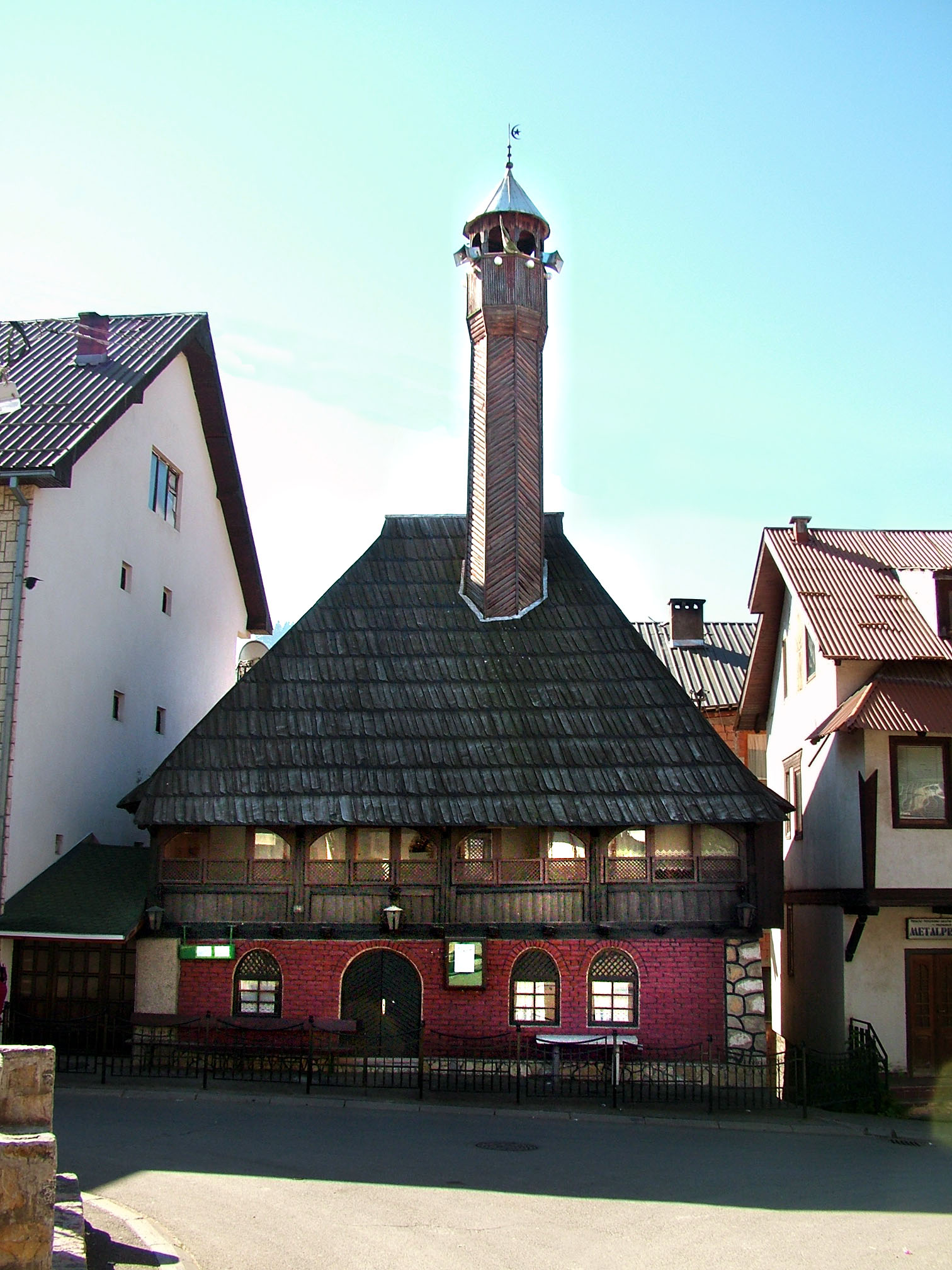
Kučanska Mosque in Rožaje

At the beginning of the 18th century, some people from the Kuči and Kelmendi were forcibly resettled by the Ottomans in the southern parts of the Sandžak, especially in the hills of the Pešter plateau, around Sjenica, and in the land strip between Novi Pazar, Tutin, Rožaje and Plav. Many of these converted to Islam over time and came to form an important part of the Muslim population in these regions.

In 1774, in the same month of the death of Šćepan Mali, Mehmed Pasha Bushati attacked the Kuči and Bjelopavlići, but was subsequently decisively defeated and returned to Scutari. Bushati had broken into Kuči and "destroyed" it; the Rovčani housed and protected some of the refugee families.

In 1794, the Kuči and Rovčani were devastated by the Ottomans.

From the late 17th to the early 18th century, many brotherhoods that were from Kuči left the area whether as refugees from Ottoman punitive campaigns or simply as emigrants and settled further north, mostly in the Sandzak area, where many converted to Islam. The movements and conversion included about 30 of the 86 brotherhoods which lived in Kuči at the time.

=== Modern ===
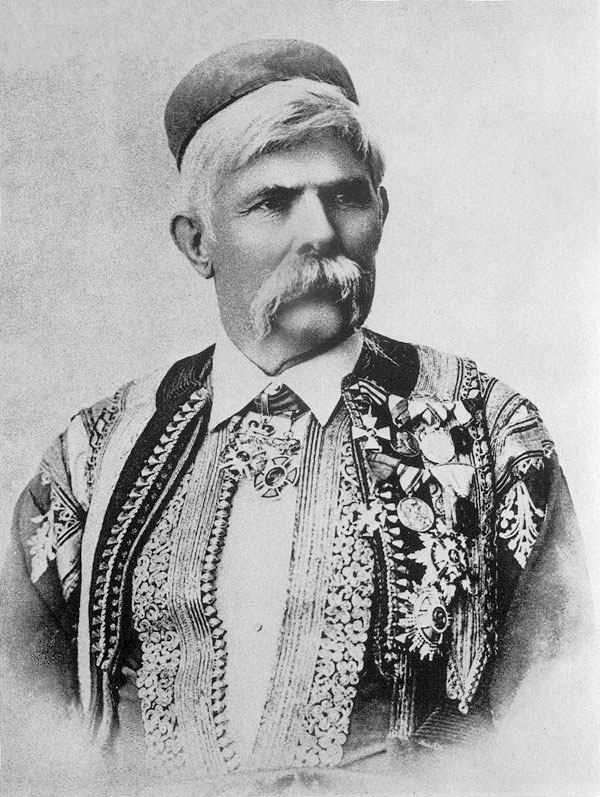
Marko Miljanov (1833–1901), chieftain of Kuči.

The Ottoman increase of taxes in October 1875 sparked the Great Eastern Crisis, which included a series of rebellions, firstly with the Herzegovina Uprising (1875–77), which prompted Serbia and Montenegro declaring war on the Ottoman Empire (see Serbian–Ottoman War and Montenegrin–Ottoman War) and culminated with the Russians following suit (Russo-Turkish War). In Kuči, chieftain Marko Miljanov Popović organized resistance against the Ottomans and joined forces with the Montenegrins. The Kuči, identifying as a Serb tribe, asked to be united with Montenegro. After the Berlin Congress, Kuči was included into the borders of the Principality of Montenegro.

At the Battle of Novšiće, following the Velika attacks (1879), the battalions of Kuči, Vasojevići and Bratonožići fought the Albanian irregulars under the command of Ali Pasha of Gusinje, and were defeated.

== Anthropology ==
=== Ethnography ===
Like many rural areas in Montenegro and the Balkans in general, Kuči has suffered heavily from emigration since the collapse of Yugoslavia. The 2011 Montenegrin census recorded about 1,000 inhabitants in total in the villages traditionally associated with Kuči. Two major ethnic groups inhabit the region: ethnic Montenegrins and ethnic Serbs (see Montenegrin Serbs), though these may be regarded as one, as some families may politically be split between the two, i.e. with one brother opting for a Montenegrin identity and another a Serb. Most of the inhabitants are followers of the Serbian Orthodox Church, while a minority are ethnic Muslims. There is an enclave of Roman Catholic Albanians in the village of Koći (Koja in Albanian) and Fundina.

Christian Orthodox residents used to be split into two distinct groups: Old Kuči ("Starokuči") and Drekalovići/New Kuči. Mariano Bolizza in his voyage in the area in 1614 recorded that Lale Drekalov and Niko Raičkov held 490 houses of the Chuzzi Albanesi ("Albanian Kuči", a village of predominantly Roman Catholic religion), with 1,500 soldiers, described as "very war-like and courageous". The Drekalovići, the largest brotherhood of Kuči, numbered close to 800 households in 1941, roughly half of all of Kuči. The Islamization of Kuči has made a minority of inhabitants declaring as simply Montenegrins, or Muslims by ethnicity, and Bosniaks although they trace the same origin with that of their Christian brethren.

=== Oral traditions ===
There are various oral traditions with varying degrees of consistency with archival records. In Montenegro, Marko Miljanov himself from Kuči wrote in his book about his home region that the Kuči and Berisha were "regarded close", allegedly because the Berisha ancestors settled from Kuči; Konstantin Jireček further recorded about this story that Old Kuči (Staro Kuči), which placed a Grča, son of Nenad as its ancestor also placed him as an ancestor of the Berisha tribe. On the contrary, in Berisha it is believed that Old Kuči itself descends from Berisha and is called Berisha i Kuq (Red Berisha) as opposed to Berisha of Pukë, Mërturi and a part of Piperi that traces its origin from Berisha, who are collectively called Berisha i Bardh (White Berisha). In historical record, Berisha and the Old Kuči appear in different areas and timelines as Old Kuči formed part of the tribe of current Kuči, which was based on different ancestral groups in the late 15th century . Nevertheless, if not kin by blood, Montenegrin and Albanian tribes regarded closeness in original or home territory from where someone "came". Therefore, Serbian geographer Andrija Jovićević put forward the narrative that the Kuči were "kin" to Kastrati, Berisha and Kelmendi because their distant ancestor once, ostensibly, settled in the same general area as Kuči.

Another late 19th century tradition was recorded by Jovan Erdeljanović in Kuči, the most intricate versions of which were from Kržanj, Žikoviće, Kostroviće, Bezihovo, Kute, Podgrad and Lazorce. According to this story, the Old Kuči descended from Gojko, the brother of King Vukašin. His descendants were forced to flee Shkodra with the Ottoman invasion and settled in Brštan. Gojko Mrnjavčevic, however, is a fictional character in Serb epic poetry, who dies in the 1371 Battle of Maritsa in folk tradition itself.

=== Language ===
The South Slavic dialect spoken in Kuči forms a speech group with Bratonožići and Piperi. South Slavic in these three communities is marked by close contact with the northern Albanian dialects of Malësia. This is especially apparent in the dialects of Kuči and Bratonožići, largely because of the historic bilingualism that was present in the area.

However, as Kuči is in a transitional area between the Albanian and Slavic languages, it has become the subject of historiographical dispute. In particular, Serbian historiography has been criticized, as muting in the area Albanian and Slavic symbiosis and bilingualism in favor of a monoethnic and monolingual Serbian narrative, a trend evident in ethnographers of the early 20th century like Jovan Erdeljanović and Jovan Cvijić. Older Serbian or Yugoslav historiography and ethnography on the Kuči conflated the Ottoman nahiye of Kuči—an administrative unit composed of different communities—with the Kuči tribe. As such, the Albanian tribes that were within the nahiye and would later be administratively within Kuči following the incorporation of their lands into the Montenegrin state, such as Trieshi and Koja e Kuçit, were treated as branches or regions of the Kuči tribe despite their distinct histories and identities.

=== Culture ===
In terms of traditional customs, up to the end of the 19th century traces of a variant of the northern Albanian kanuns remained in use in Kuči. Marie Amelie von Godin in her travels still reported traces of bilingualism in the area of Kuči. According to her reports, although Albanian was no longer spoken in the area, some laments and oaths were still being sung and recited in Albanian.

== People ==
born in Kuči

- Lale Drekalov, vojvoda of the Kuči tribe, Drekale's son
- Iliko Lalev, vojvoda of tribe, successor of his father, Lale
- Radonja Petrović, vojvoda of the Kuči tribe.
- Marko Miljanov (1833–1901), vojvoda, Montenegrin general and writer.
- Mihailo Ivanović (1874–1949), Montenegrin politician
- Bogdan Vujošević, Partisan

by descent

- Momir Bulatović, First President of the Republic of Montenegro
- Đorđe Čarapić, Serbian voivode and revolutionary
- Marko Čarapić, Serbian voivode and revolutionary, Đorđe's younger brother
- Tanasije Čarapić, Serbian voivoide and revolutionary, uncle of Đorđe and Marko
- Vasa Čarapić, Serbian voivode and revolutionary, elder brother of Tanasije
- Evgenije Popović, Montenegrin politician and journalist
- Duško Vujošević, Serbian retired basketball coach
- Fahrudin Radončić, Bosniak politician
- Jakup Ferri, Albanian fighter and national hero of Albania
- Shemsi Pasha, Ottoman Albanian general
- Bogdan Milić, Montenegrin footballer
- Miloš Vučević, Serbian lawyer and politician serving as prime minister of Serbia since May 2024

== Bibliography ==
- Đurđev, Branislav (1984). Postanak i razvitak brdskih, crnogorskih i hercegovačkih plemena [The origin and development of the Highland, Montenegrin and Hercegovinian tribes] (in Serbian). Titograd: Crnogorska akademija nauka i umjetnosti.
- Elsie, Robert (30 May 2015). The Tribes of Albania: History, Society and Culture. I.B.Tauris. ISBN 978-1-78453-401-1.
- Pulaha, Selami (1975). "Kontribut për studimin e ngulitjes së katuneve dhe krijimin e fiseve në Shqipe ̈rine ̈ e veriut shekujt XV-XVI' [Contribution to the Study of Village Settlements and the Formation of the Tribes of Northern Albania in the 15th century]". Studime Historike. 12.
- Vasić, Milan (1990), Etnički odnosi u jugoslovensko-albanskom graničnom području prema popisnom defteru sandžaka Skadar iz 1582/83. godine
- Xhufi, Pëllumb (2021). "Brda, or Bardha?". Studia Albanica. 2: 25–42. ISSN 0585-5047.
- Ajeti, Idriz (2017). Studime për gjuhën shqipe [Studies on the Albanian language] (PDF). Academy of Sciences of Kosovo.
