= Radonja Petrović =

Duke of the Kuči tribe (1670–1737)

- Радоња Петровић
- Born: 1670; Kosor, Kuči, Prince-Bishopric of Montenegro
- Died: 1737 (aged 66–67); Stari Vlah, Raška, Prince-Bishopric of Montenegro

Radonja Petrović (Serbian Cyrillic: Радоња Петровић; 1670 in Kosor, Kuči – 1737 in Stari Vlah), known as Vojvoda Radonja (војвода Радоња) was the vojvoda of the Kuči tribe and a commander of the Drekalovići during the Austro–Russian–Turkish War. Vasilije Petrović wrote in History of Montenegro that Petrović was among the Montenegrin commanders who rose to arms under the influence of Danilo I, Metropolitan of Cetinje in 1711.

== Lineage ==
Petrović was the great-great-grandson of Drekale, the eponymous founder of Drekalovići. Petrović's father Petar was the middle child of Vojvoda Iliko Lalev and held the title of vojvoda until his death, when it was passed to his brother Mirčeta.

== Military career ==
Petrović succeeded his uncle as vojvoda and became the leader of the Drekalovići in Brda, called "the Hills," in modern-day Montenegro. Along with Habsburg Serbian troops, the Drekalovići fought against the Ottomans. Venetians granted him the title of Guvernadur of all the Hills for acting as middleman between them and the Ottomans.

In the talks with Austrian representatives in the village of Tešići near Niš on 24 July 1737, Petrović and Patriarch Šakabenta promised Field Marshal Seckendorff that they would mobilise the Kuči and other Highland tribes. Five hundred Kuči men, 200 Vasojevići, and Piperi, among others, were prepared. Šakabenta and Petrović called on Sava Petrović to join the war against the Ottomans, but he was under the influence of the Republic of Venice and remained inactive during the war. Petrović asked Field Marshal Seckendorff that, in the event that the rebels won, he would oversee the troops in his stead. An uprising broke out in Montenegro while talks were still underway.

Petrović's rebels, Serbian troops, and an auxiliary force of Mlatišuma attacked local Muslims. According to Serbia's plan, they were to take over Novi Pazar, Rožaje, Bijelo Polje, and Peć. A Serbian detachment attacked Bihor and pushed through to Godijevo, where they set up headquarters in the house of Mustafa Sijarić. Petrović learned that the Ottomans planned to first attack Župljani, which was already allied with the Venetians. He informed Jerolim Buća, an intendent in Cattaro, that Derviš-paša Čengić had been ordered to divert his army from the Sanjak of Herzegovina towards Knin, and that Vizier Mustafa-paša had been ordered to move towards Zadar with the armies of other sanjaks and 4,000 Tatars. This information was likely exaggerated.

== Death and legacy ==
Petrović died on the Jelica mountain in 1737 and was buried there. In 1766, his son Grigorije, who became the archimandrite of Niš, exhumed his remains and reburied them in the village of Bošnjace near Leskovac. In 2014, 277 years after his death, his remains were moved again, this time to his birth village of Kosor. His uncle Mirčeta's grandson Martin Popović became vojvoda. Though Petrović's siblings and their descendants continued to use the surname Petrović, his offspring adopted the surname Radonjić.

Epic poems have been written about his life, including Ustanak sedmoro Brda i Arbanasa (The Uprising of the Seven Hills and the Albanians).
