= Piperi (tribe) =

Highlander tribe of Montenegro

Piperi (Cyrillic: Пипери) is a historical tribe (pleme) of Albanian origin and a region in northeastern Montenegro. Piperi is located between the Morača and Zeta rivers up to the northern suburbs of the Montenegrin capital Podgorica.

== Origins ==
Originally an Albanian tribe (Albanian: Pipri), the Piperi underwent a process of gradual cultural integration into the neighbouring Slavic population. A Franciscan report of the 17th century illustrates the final stages of their acculturation. Its author writes that the Bratonožići, Piperi, Bjelopavlići and Kuči:" nulla di meno essegno quasi tutti del rito serviano, e di lingua Illrica ponno piu presto dirsi Schiavoni, ch' Albanesi " (since almost all of them use the Serbian rite and the Illyric (Slavic) language, soon they should be called Slavs, rather than Albanians). Historical research has shown that Piperi is not a tribe (pleme) of common patrilineal ancestry. It formed in the period between the mid 15th century and the 16th century by communities that settled in different periods in Piperi, where they also found an already settled population.

== History ==
=== Late Middle Ages and early modern period ===
What might be the earliest references to the Piperi are the mentions of individuals bearing the surname Piper(i), the first being Vlado Piper, in Ragusan sources dating from 1285, the second being Radoslav Mihailo Piper, in the archives of Kotor from 1398, as well as three household heads recorded in the Venetian cadastre of 1416-7 for Scutari and its environs: Andrea and Jon Piperi from Trush (Trompsi), and Calozorzi Piperi from Dhozan located near Trush.

While several other people with the surname Piper appear in the Kotor records from the 15th century, the first direct mention of the Piperi as a community dates to 1444, in a Ragusan Senate report filed by Ragusan merchants. There, they appear as one of the katuns who, together with the Bjelopavlići and Vasojevići, attacked Ragusan merchants and did some material damage to them near the village of Rječica (now Lijeva Rijeka). In 1455, the Piperi katun is mentioned as part of other katuns and villages from Zeta who signed an agreement with the Venetians on the island of Vranjina.

Following the Ottoman conquest of Upper Zeta in 1474 and the subsequent fall of Scutari in 1479, the Piperi are mentioned as a distinct nahiya in the 1485 defter of the newly created Sanjak of Scutari. Their area then consisted of 21 villages, two of which were deserted, with a total of 226 households. This number almost doubled in the supplementary defter of 1497, where the nahiya of Piperi consisted in 427 households. This indicates that many of the newcomers were refugees from areas conquered in Montenegro and northern Albania. In the defter of 1497, there are several kin groups in the region of Piperi, which appears as a distinct nahiya divided in three timars under local Christian Ottoman spahis. Many communities of the villages of Piperi were categorized as already settled or newcomers from other areas. In the villages, the communities formed clusters of households according to their kinship ties. This separation of settlements by kinship persisted even in the early 20th century. The settlements of Piperi in 1497 were Luška Župa (now Crnci), Drezga, Zavala, Dobriko, Mrke, Hrasnica, Bjelice, Duga, Brestica (river near Spuž), Rječica, Strahalić, Moračica, Radušev Do and Drenovica. Some villages were part of distinct communities, identified as katuns within the defter, those were Katun Bukumir, Katun Bušat (Bushat) and Katun Drenovica. All three katuns were located in the Bratonožići area. The Slavic/Serb anthroponymy at that time in Piperi is mainly attributed to the Lužani, while the Albanian anthroponymy to Bukumiri, Bushati and some smaller communities. Other communities like the Macure and the Mataruge had also settled in Piperi. Their traces can be identified mainly within the Lužani whom they had joined by that time in historical record. The toponym Macur jama (pit of Macura) in today's Piperi is linked to them. A part of the people of Piperi have retained in their traditions that before becoming Orthodox they were Catholics.

In 1614, Mariano Bolizza recorded that the Piperi had a total of 270 houses, of Serbian Orthodox faith. In 1613, the Ottomans launched a campaign against the rebel tribes of Montenegro. In response, Piperi along with the tribes of Kuči, Bjelopavlići, Vasojevići, Kastrat, Kelmend, Shkrel and Hot formed a political and military union known as “The Union of the Mountains” or “The Albanian Mountains”. In their shared assemblies, the leaders swore an oath of besa to resist with all their might any upcoming Ottoman expeditions, thereby protecting their self-government and disallowing the establishment of the authority of the Ottoman Spahis in the northern highlands. Their uprising had a liberating character. The 700 men in arms were commanded by Radoslav Božidarov. Giovanni Bembo, the Doge of Venice (1615–1618), had defeated the Serb pirates (Uskoks), whom the Austrians had employed against the Republic of Venice; they were forced to take refuge at Nikšić and Piperi, and established themselves in the villages and tribes, under the later leadership of the Petrović-Njegoš family that held the office of Serbian Orthodox Metropolitan of Cetinje (later Vladika, Prince-Bishop) after 1694. They fought Osman Pasha in 1732 and Mahmut Pasha in 1788.

The Piperi are recorded in an Ottoman historical report of Mustafa Naima as among the Albanian communities which rose in rebellion against the Ottoman authorities between 1637-8. According to the report, while the Piperi and Bjelopavlići had first submitted and provided sustenance to the Ottoman forces under Vučo Mehmed Pasha on his campaign against the Kelmendi, the former later rose again in rebellion following the Ottoman retreat from Kelmend. In response to this, Vučo Mehmed Pasha led a raid into Piperi in which the women and children were taken as prisoners of war, the head of the tribe was beheaded, and another from the leadership of the tribe named Hotash (or Hutash) was taken as a prisoner to be executed for his crimes against the empire. The report describes the population of the nahiyah of Piperi as Albanian.

=== Late modern period ===
In 1796 they fought Mahmut Pasha again, in the Battle of Martinići (in modern Danilovgrad). They fought Tahir Pasha around 1810. Prince-Bishop Petar I (r. 1782-1830) waged a successful campaign against the bey of Bosnia in 1819; the repulse of an Ottoman invasion from Albania during the Russo-Turkish War led to the recognition of Montenegrin sovereignty over Piperi. Petar I had managed to unite the Piperi and Bjelopavlići with Old Montenegro. A civil war broke out in 1847, in which the Piperi, Kuči, Bjelopavlići and Crmnica sought to confront the growing centralized power of new prince of Montenegro; the secessionists were subdued and their ringleaders shot. Amid the Crimean War, there was a political problem in Montenegro; Danilo I's uncle, George, urged for yet another war against the Ottomans, but the Austrians advised Danilo not to take arms. A conspiracy was formed against Danilo, led by his uncles George and Pero, the situation came to its height when the Ottomans stationed troops along the Herzegovinian frontier, provoking the mountaineers. Some urged an attack on Bar, others raided into Herzegovina, and the discontent of Danilo's subjects grew so much that the Piperi, Kuči and Bjelopavlići, the recent and still unamalgamated acquisitions, proclaimed themselves an independent state in July, 1854. Danilo was forced to take measurement against the rebels in Brda, some crossed into Turkish territory and some submitted and were to pay for the civil war they had caused.

Petar II Petrović-Njegoš founded the police force (gvardija) throughout the Prince-Bishopric of Montenegro, as part of his transformation from a tribal federation to a proper state; 26 existed in Piperi.

==== 20th century ====
The Piperi were one of the tribes that constituted the "Greens" (Zelenaši), a political faction that saw the unification of Montenegro to Serbia in 1918, as the annexation of Montenegro, and instead supported an independent Montenegro. The Greens instigated the Christmas Uprising on January 7, 1919, which was crushed by Serbian troops.

During World War II the majority of the tribe supported the Yugoslav Partisans. The Montenegrin committee of the Yugoslav Communist Party was dominated by Piperi clansmen prior to the war, and they were instigators of the July 1941 uprising. One of the most famous Piperi communists was Dr. Vukasin Markovic, a personal associate to Lenin, who came back after the October revolution from Russia to Montenegro, planning to stage a Soviet revolution. After its failure and his arrest, he fled to the USSR, where he assumed party duties.

== Anthropology ==
=== Oral tradition ===
From the 19th century onwards, oral traditions and fragmentary stories were collected by writers and scholars who travelled in the region, about the early history of Piperi. An interdisciplinary and comparative approach of those stories with recorded historical material has yielded more historically-grounded accounts in 20th and 21st centuries.

Johann Georg von Hahn recorded the oral tradition about Piperi's origins in the mid 19th century. The same oral tradition with minor variations is preserved in other communities of the region. According to it the first direct male ancestor was a certain Keq, a Catholic Albanian who fled from Ottoman conquest and settled in a Slavic-speaking area that would become the historical Piperi region. His sons, Lazër Keqi (ancestor of Hoti), Ban Keqi (ancestor of Triepshi), Merkota Keqi, Kaster Keqi (ancestor of Krasniqi) and Vas Keqi (ancestor of Vasojevići) had to abandon the village after committing murder against the locals, but Keq and his younger son Piper Keqi remained there and Piper Keqi became the direct ancestor of the Piperi tribe. The name of the first ancestor, Keq, which means bad in Albanian, is given in Malësia to only children or to children from families with very few children (due to infant mortality). In those families, an "ugly" name (i çudun) was given as a spoken talisman to protect the child from the "evil eye".

About half a century later, the ethnologist Jovan Erdeljanović travelled to the region and made multiple surveys of the tribe in which he recorded many of its customs and traditions. He also collected stories from the members of the tribe, regarding its origins and brotherhoods. According to the oral tradition, after the fall of the Serbian Despotate in the 15th century, one nobleman called Gojko, with his family, left southern Serbia and came to Morača. Four major brotherhoods of the Piperi are said to stem from him: the Đurkovići, Lazarevići, Petrovići and Vukotići. Erdeljanović identified that the oral tradition originated from the Lutovci, the most important part of the tribe, and concluded that they were newcomers who stelled in the area after the fall of the Despotate. Erdeljanović also stated that the four main bratstva (brotherhoods) from the Rogami region, the Rajkovići, Stamatovići, Vučinići and Vukanovići, had become pobratim (blood brothers) and that they all celebrate the slava of Archangel Michael.

=== Culture ===
In terms of traditional customs, up to the end of the 19th century, traces of a variant of the northern Albanian kanuns remained in use in Piperi.

In the first half of 20th century, Marie Amelie von Godin, while travelling in Montenegro, reported traces of bilingualism in the area of Piperi. According to her reports, although Albanian was no longer spoken in the area, some laments and oaths were still being sung and recited in Albanian.

=== Identity ===
In the 18th century, they were mentioned as a "Serbian Orthodox clan" in a historical and geographical survey from 1757 and a letter sent by the Clan federation to Russia from 1789. Documents, especially the letter of Ivan Radonjić from 1789, show that Montenegrins were then identified as Serbs, while the Banjani, Kuči, Piperi, Bjelopavlići, Zećani, Vasojevići, Bratonožići were not identified as "Montenegrins" but only as Serb tribes. They were all mentioned only in a regional, geographical, and tribal manner, and never as an ethnic category.

However, since the breakup of Yugoslavia, the main part of people living in the Piperi area identify themselves as Montenegrins, with a small majority of them supporting the independence of Montenegro.

== Brotherhoods and families ==
- Alagić
- Aćimić
- Božidarić
- Buljević
- Banović
- Bašanović*
- Bešević
- Becić
- Boljević
- Bošković*
- Božović
- Bracanović
- Brković
- Živaljević
- Žujović
- Dakić
- Dragićević
- Dragišić
- Đukić
- Đurašević*
- Đurović
- Filipović
- Gegić*
- Gligorović
- Goričan*
- Grubeljić*
- Ivanović
- Ivančević
- Jelenić
- Jovanović
- Jovović
- Kaluđerović
- Lakićević
- Lakočević
- Latković
- Plačković
- Piper
- Lalić*
- Ljumović
- Makočević
- Maudić
- Marković
- Matanović
- Matić
- Matović
- Mijović
- Miličković
- Milićević
- Milunović
- Nikolić
- Novaković
- Novićević
- Hot
- Hotić
- Otović
- Hotović
- Olević
- Pajić
- Petrović
- Piletić
- Piperović
- Piperski
- Popović
- Pulević
- Radević
- Radonjić
- Radovanović
- Radunović*
- Rajković
- Raslović*
- Ristović
- Savović
- Simović
- Stanić*
- Stojanović
- Todorović
- Tiodorović
- Šćepanović
- Šušović
- Šujak
- Vučinić
- Vujović*
- Vukanović
- Vukotić
- Šćekić
- Vuletić*
- Vuljević*
- Vulikić
- Vušutović*
- Ćetković
- Ćosić

== Notable people ==
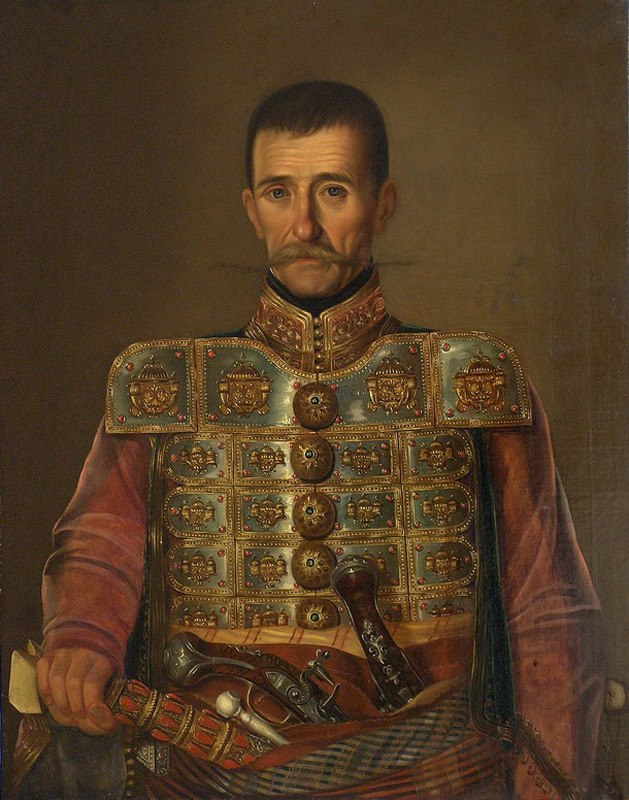
Mirko Apostolović, also known as Uzun-Mirko

- Uzun-Mirko, Serbian voivode, with the rank of bimbaša during the Serbian revolution
- Tanasko Rajić, Serbian voivode and revolutionary
- Arso Jovanović, Yugoslav Partisan commander during World War II
- Blažo Jovanović, Yugoslav communist and president of Montenegro
- Savić Marković Štedimlija, pro-Croatian Montenegrin ideologist and Ustasha regime collaborator
- Milutin Vučinić, Prime Minister of the Kingdom of Montenegro in Exile
- Boro Vučinić, Montenegrin politician and former defense minister
- Ivan Milutinović, (1901—1944) was a Yugoslav partisan general who died during World War II in Yugoslavia.
- Mladen Žujović, member of Konspiracija
- Sreten Žujović, Serbian and Yugoslav politician
- Jovan Žujović, Serbian anthropologist.
- Milo Milunović, notable Yugoslav painter.
- Tomislav Nikolić, former President of Serbia
- Jevrem Brković, Montenegrin writer
- Balša Brković, Montenegrin writer, son of Jevrem
- Veselin Vukotić, Montenegrin economist, professor, politician, and university rector

== See also ==
- Stephen of Piperi, Serbian saint
- Piperi, a settlement in Bosnia and Herzegovina

== Sources ==
- Banac, Ivo (1984). The national question in Yugoslavia: origins, history, politics. Cornell University Press. ISBN 978-0-8014-9493-2. Archived from the original on 2023-03-13.
- Banac, Ivo (1988). With Stalin against Tito: Cominformist splits in Yugoslav Communism. Cornell University Press. ISBN 978-0-8014-2186-0. Archived from the original on 2023-03-13.
- Banac, Ivo (1992). Protiv straha : članci, izjave i javni nastupi, 1987-1992 (in Croatian). Slon. OCLC 29027519. Archived from the original on 2023-03-13.
- Berishaj, Anton Kole (1995). "Islamization -- Seed of Discord or the Only Way of Salvation for Albanians?". Occasional Papers on Religion in Eastern Europe. 15 (5). Archived from the original on 2022-10-24.
- Capra, Sisto; Gjomarkaj, Gjon; Xoxa, Arben (2000). Albania proibita: il sangue, l'onore e il codice delle montagne (in Italian). Memisis. ISBN 9788884830012. Archived from the original on 2023-03-13.
- Curtis, Matthew Cowan (2012). Slavic-Albanian Language Contact, Convergence, and Coexistence. The Ohio State University.
- Đurđev, Branislav (1984). Postanak i razvitak brdskih, crnogorskih i hercegovackih plemena (PDF) (in Serbian). Crnogorska Akademija Nauka i Umjetnosti. Archived (PDF) from the original on 2020-09-19.
- Egro, Dritan (2010). "Islam in the Albanian lands (XVth-XVIIth Century)". In Schmitt, Oliver Jens (ed.). Religion und Kultur im albanischsprachigen Südosteuropa. Peter Lang. ISBN 9783631602959. Archived from the original on 2023-03-13.
- Elsie, Robert, ed. (2003). "Mariano Bolizza: Report and description of the Sanjak of Shkodra 1614". Early Albania, a Reader of Historical Texts. Otto Harrassowitz Verlag. Archived from the original on 2020-08-05.
- Erdeljanović, Jovan (1981). Kuči, Bratonožići, Piperi (in Serbian). Slovo Ljubve.
- Gostentschnigg, Kurt (2017). Wissenschaft im Spannungsfeld von Politik und Militär. Die österreichisch-ungarische Albanologie 1867-1918. Springer Fachmedien Wiesbaden. ISBN 9783658189112. Archived from the original on 2023-03-13.
- Hahn, Johan Georg von (2015). Elsie, Robert (ed.). The Discovery of Albania: Travel Writing and Anthropology in the Nineteenth Century. I. B. Tauris. ISBN 978-1784532925. Archived from the original on 2023-03-13.
- Kaser, Karl (1992). Hirten, Kämpfer, Stammeshelden. Ursprünge und Gegenwart des balkanischen Patriarchats [Shepherds, fighters, tribal heroes. Origins and present of the Balkan patriarchate]. Böhlau. ISBN 978-3-205-05545-7.
- Kola, Azeta (2017-02-25). "From Serenissima's Centralization to the Self-Regulating Kanun: The Strengthening of Blood Ties and the Rise of Great Albanian Tribes, 15th to 17th Centuries". Acta Histriae.
- Kovijanić, Risto (1974). Pomeni crnogorskih plemena u kotorskim spomenicima (XIV–XVI vijek) [Mentions of Montenegrin tribes in Kotor records (14th–16th centuries)] (in Serbian). Vol. II. Istorijski institut SR Crne Gore.
- Martucci, Donato (2021). "«Il mio destino balcanico». L'illirismo di Antonio Baldacci tra viaggi di esplorazione e senilità". Palaver. 10 (1). Archived from the original on 2021-05-17.
- Miller, William (2012). The Ottoman Empire and its Successors 1801-1927. Routledge. ISBN 978-1-136-26046-9. Archived from the original on 2023-03-13.
- Palavestra, Vlajko (1971). "Folk traditions of the ancient populations of the dinaric regions". Wissenschaftliche Mitteilungen des Bosnisch-Herzegowinischen Landesmuseums: Volkskunde. 1.
- Pešikan, Mitar (1983). "Zetsko-humsko-raška imena na početku turskog doba (drugi deo)" [Zeta-Hum-Raška names at the beginning of the Turkish era (second part)]. Onomatološki prilozi. 4: 1–135.
- Pulaha, Selami (1974). Defteri i Regjistrimit te͏̈ Sanxhakut të Shkodrës i vitit 1485 (in Albanian). Akademia e Shkencave e RP të Shqipërisë. Archived from the original on 2020-08-09.
- Shkurtaj, Gjovalin (2009). Sociolinguistikë e shqipes: Nga dialektologjia te etnografia e të folurit [Socio-linguistics of Albanian: from dialectology to the ethnography of spoken language] (in Albanian). Morava. ISBN 978-99956-26-28-0. Archived from the original on 2023-03-13.
- Vučinić, Stevo (2017). Prilozi proučavanju Ljetopisa Popa Dukljanina i ranosrednjovjekovne Duklje (in Montenegrin). Fakultetu za crnogorski jezik i književnost. Archived from the original on 2022-07-19.
- Vujović, Dimitrije Dimo (1987). Prilozi Izučavanju Crnogorskog Nacionalnog Pitanja [Contributions to the Study of the Montenegrin National Question] (in Serbian). Univerzitetska Riječ. Archived from the original on 2023-03-13.
- Vukčević, Nikola (1981). Etničko porijeklo Crnogoraca (in Serbian).
- Xhufi, Pëllumb (2013). "Përkime shqiptaro-malazeze në mesjetë". In Ramaj, Albert (ed.). Poeta nascitur, historicus fit - Ad honorem Zef Mirdita (in Albanian). Albanisches Institut. Archived from the original on 2022-08-09.
- Zlatar, Zdenko (2007a). The poetics of Slavdom: the mythopoeic foundations of Yugoslavia. Vol. 1. Peter Lang. ISBN 978-0-8204-8118-0. Archived from the original on 2023-03-13.
- Zlatar, Zdenko (2007b). The poetics of Slavdom: the mythopoeic foundations of Yugoslavia. Vol. 2. Peter Lang. ISBN 978-0-8204-8135-7. Archived from the original on 2023-03-13.
