= Convention of Kuçi =

- Native name: Kuvendi i Kuçit
- Date: July 14–15, 1614
- Location: Kuçi, Malësia

The Convention of Kuçi (Albanian: Kuvendi i Kuçit) was an interregional assembly held on July 14–15, 1614, in the area of the Kuçi tribe in the region of Malësia in modern northernmost Albania and Montenegro. A second assembly was held on September 8, 1614, which reaffirmed the decisions of the July assembly and also had an enlarged participation. Of the 44 representatives of the first assembly, almost all were from the Albanian tribes and the tribes of Montenegro. Several representatives of tribes are mentioned in the reports of the decisions of the assembly like Gjergj Bardhi from Mirdita and Gjin Gjergji from Dukagjin.

The second assembly also included representatives from Bosnia, Herzegovina, Serbia, Bulgaria, Macedonia and Dalmatia. For this reason, in Albanian historiography it is described as a pan-Balkan assembly.

In both assemblies one its chief organizers was Lale Drekalov (Lala Drekali) head of the tribe of Kuçi The goal of the assembly was to gain aid from the Papacy and Duke of Parma in the struggle against Ottoman rule. A Venetian diplomat from nearby Kotor, Mariano Bolizza was present in the assemblies. The assembly sent Giovanni Renesi in Italy to present the plan to the Papacy and the Duke of Parma. The assembly tried like the previous Convention of Mat and Convention of Dukagjin to seek help from the Pope, and though promises were made from the European powers, no help arrived. Later on, more revolts would take place.

== See also ==
- Ottoman Albania
- Convention of Mat
- League of Lezhë
- Holy League (1594)
- Albanian revolt of 1432–1436
