= Drekalovići =

Historical union in the Kuči tribe

The Drekalovići (Cyrillic: Дрекаловићи; Albanian: Ndrekalorë) are a historical union of brotherhoods of Kuči. Their patron saint (slava) is St. Nicholas (Nikoljdan), the old tradition of Orthodox Serbs. They were part of a wave of settlement in the mid 16th century in the area of Kuči, and came to form an important part of it. Unlike the brotherhoods that form Old Kuči (the families that already lived in the area before their arrival) the Drekalovići all claim ancestry from a single ancestor, Drekale after whom they are named.

Originally, a Catholic brotherhood, they gradually became Orthodox, in particular after the conversion of their leader Lale Drekalov in the 17th century when Rufim Njeguš was Metropolitan of Cetinje. The Drekalovići do not marry within Kuči, and historically form no marriage with a part of Kastrati, which according to Edith Durham trace descent from emigrants from Drekalovići.

== Notable people ==
- Drekale
- Lale Drekalov
- Iliko Lalev
- Radonja Petrović
- Marko Miljanov Popović
