= Gošović =

Gošović is a Serbian surname. It is found in Montenegro and Serbia. The Gošović families belong to the Krivodoljani brotherhood of Old Kuči. It may refer to:

- Stracimir Gošović, author
- Radmila Gošović, Vesna Gošović, authors
- Vukić Gošović-Komski, Miroslav Đurović, Stefanija Gošović, authors
- Petar Gošović, Montenegrin volleyball player
- Danijela Gošović, Montenegrin volleyball player
