= Grbavci, Montenegro =

Grbavci Грбавци
- Village
- Location within Montenegro
- Country: Montenegro
- Municipality: Podgorica

Population (2011)
  - Total: 575
- Time zone: UTC+1 (CET)
  - Summer (DST): UTC+2 (CEST)

Grbavci (Serbian Cyrillic: Грбавци) is a village in the municipality of Podgorica, Montenegro.

== Demographics ==
According to the 2011 census, its population was 575.

Ethnicity in 2011
| Ethnicity | Number | Percentage |
|---|---|---|
| Montenegrins | 361 | 62.8% |
| Serbs | 175 | 30.4% |
| other/undeclared | 39 | 6.8% |
| Total | 575 | 100% |
