= Mitrovići, Zeta =

Mitrovići Митровићи
- Village
- Location within Montenegro
- Country: Montenegro
- Municipality: Podgorica

Population (2011)
  - Total: 299
- Time zone: UTC+1 (CET)
  - Summer (DST): UTC+2 (CEST)

Mitrovići (Serbian Cyrillic: Митровићи) is a village in the new Zeta Municipality of Montenegro. Until 2022, it was part of Podgorica Municipality.

== Demographics ==
According to the 2011 census, its population was 299.

Ethnicity in 2011
Ethnicity	Number	Percentage
Montenegrins	190	63.5%
Serbs	88	29.4%
other/undeclared	21	7.0%
Total	299	100%
