= Brezine =

Brezine may refer to:

- Brežine, a village in Montenegro
- Brezine, Zagreb County, a village near Farkaševac, Croatia
- Brezine, Požega-Slavonia County, a village near Lipik, Croatia
- Brežine Mass Grave, a site near Jelšane, Slovenia

== See also ==
- Brezina (disambiguation)
