= Tom Plezha =

- Allegiance: Republic of Venice (former), Albanian resistance
- Rank: Captain
- Known for: Negotiations with the Pope against the Ottoman Empire
- Conflicts: Battle of Lepanto (1571)
- Other work: Delegate to the Convention of Mat (1594)

Tom Plezha was an Albanian leader chosen at the Convention of Mat to negotiate an alliance with the Pope against the Ottoman Empire.

== Life ==
Tom Plezha held the title Captain serving the Republic of Venice. He took part in the Battle of Lepanto in 1571 and was taken prisoner of war by Ottomans. After gaining freedom, he decided to not serve Venetians again and joined Albanian leaders in organization of Albanian revolts against the Ottoman Empire. He participated in the Convention of Mat which was organized on November 7, 1594 by Albanian leaders. The convention decided that help should be sought from the Pope, and the trusted and experienced leaders Tom Plezha, Mark Gjini and Nikollë Mekajshi were chosen to undertake the negotiations.

== Legacy ==
There is a street in Tirana named after Tom Plezha in memory of his contribution to the Albanian struggle for independence. The street is called “Rruga Tom Plezha” in the Astir neighbourhood.

== See also ==
- Ottoman Albania

== Sources ==
- Aleks Buda (1985). Fjalor enciklopedik shqiptar. Akademia e Shkencave e RPSSH.
- Jehona. 1969.
