= Ubli =

Ubli may refer to several places:

In Croatia:

- Ubli, Lastovo, sometimes referred to as Uble

In Montenegro:

- Ubli, Cetinje, a settlement in the Cetinje municipality
- Ubli, Herceg Novi, a settlement in the Herceg Novi municipality
- Ubli, Nikšić, a settlement in the Nikšić municipality
- Ubli, Podgorica, a settlement in the Podgorica municipality
