= Vukovci =

Vukovci may refer to:

- Vukovci, Slovenia, a village near Črnomelj
- Vukovci, Montenegro, a village near Podgorica
