= Mark Gjini =

Mark Gjini was an Albanian leader chosen at the Convention of Mat to negotiate with the Pope an alliance against the Ottoman Empire.

== Life ==
Mark Gjini held the title of Stradiot captain serving the Republic of Venice. His service to Venetians includes his contribution in the Uskok War with six boats with 300 Albanians. Gjini was a distinguished figure of the Albanian struggle against the Ottoman Empire at the end of the end of 16th century and the beginning of the 17th century. He participated at the Convention of Mat which was held on November 7, 1594 by Albanian leaders for a better organization of their revolts. The convention decided that help should be sought from the Pope, and the trusted and experienced leaders Tom Plezha, Mark Gjini and Nikollë Mekajshi were chosen to undertake the negotiations. This was done secretly from the Republic of Venice as the latter did not want to open a new conflict with the Ottomans. A year later Gjini returned from Italy to recruit men for the implementation of plans, and was almost killed by people employed by Venetians. In 1607, Gjini led a delegation that requested help by the King of Spain. After the failure of the Mat Convention's goals, little is known about Mark Gjini. The documents, however, show that after the 1607-1608 period, he was still one of the most active anti-Ottoman leaders in Albania.

== Sources ==
- Aleks Buda (1985). Fjalor enciklopedik shqiptar. Akademia e Shkencave e RPSSH.
- Jehona. 1969.
- Instituti i Historisë (1967). Studime historike. Akademia e Shkencave.
