= Drekale =

Chieftain of the Kuči tribe and founder of the Drekalović brotherhood

Drekale Ndrekali
- voivode of Kuči
- Reign: Second half of the 16th century
- Successor: Lale Drekalović
- Noble family: Drekalović

Drekale (Serbian Cyrillic: Дрекале; Albanian: Ndrekali) was according to tradition the chieftain (vojvoda, "duke") of the Kuči tribe. Of Albanian origin, he was the founder of the Drekalovići brotherhood which produced the chieftains of Kuči for three centuries.

== Name ==
There are differing views on the etymology of Drekale. Mehmet Ahmetaj argues that the name is a compound of the Albanian anthroponyms Ndre(ri) + Kalë and is reflected in micro-toponyms such as Gropa e Drekalit (Albanian for "Drekali's Pit") in the village of Stjepoh in Trieshi. However, according to Pavel Rovinsky, Drekale is the Albanian-language corruption of Andrej; that being his actual name.

== History ==
Drekale was elected the position of vojvoda ("duke") of the Kuči tribe probably in the second half of the 16th century, based on the proposal of Dreca Dedin. According to a story, vojvoda Žijo Peralov of Kosor married his daughter Mara to Drekale. Their descendants were to be known as Drekalovići.

There are several oral traditions and legends surrounding his origin:

- One tradition maintains that Drekale's father was from the Old Kuči while his mother was the daughter of the leader of the Kelmendi, a certain Martin.
- According to Edith Durham, Drekale was a descendant of the Berisha tribe of northern Albania.

Legends about the progenitor of the Kastrati say that it was Drekale's brother who had come from Kuči, while Đ. Slijepčević stressed that it was more likely that the progenitor came from Kuči but descended from some other family as Drekale in fact had no brothers.

Dreca Dedin in fact passed his own title of Vojvoda to him, impressed by his successful peace negotiations with the Vizier of Skhoder. Marko Miljanov points out that he was the first elected Vojvoda, as well as the first Vojvoda of the overall tribe, since at the time the Ottoman authorities appointed one in every village. Drekale had two sons, Nikola and Lale. According to tradition, Drekale, along with his older son Nikola, was killed in a skirmish by the members of Kelmendi tribe while they were shepherding in the Žijevo mountains. His son Lale survived thanks to the fact that, being still young, he switched his clothes in child's play with a certain Muslim boy from Podgorica by the name of Lisičić. Unfortunate boy, who was occasionally shepherding with them, was killed instead. Some historians place this event around 1550. Lale later avenged the death of his father and brother, with the help of Muslims from Podgorica. The vengeance is described in epic folk song Priest Milutin and the Drekalovići.

== Legacy ==
Drekale is commemorated in literature and oral traditional poetry, such as Vojvoda Drekale and Vuk of the Klimente.

Marko Miljanov wrote about Drekale and his descendants in his works. Simo Matavulj extensively discussed about Drekale in one of his novels.
