= Šušunja =

Šušunja Шушуња
- Village
- Location within Montenegro
- Country: Montenegro
- Municipality: Podgorica

Population (2011)
  - Total: 267
- Time zone: UTC+1 (CET)
  - Summer (DST): UTC+2 (CEST)

Šušunja (Serbian Cyrillic: Шушуња) is a village in the new Zeta Municipality of Montenegro. Until 2022, it was part of Podgorica Municipality.

== Demographics ==
According to the 2011 census, its population was 267.

Ethnicity in 2011
Ethnicity	Number	Percentage
Montenegrins	221	82.8%
Serbs	26	9.7%
other/undeclared	20	7.5%
Total	267	100%
