= Crvena Hrvatska =

Crvena Hrvatska ('Red Croatia') was a weekly Party of Rights political newspaper that spread the ideology of Ante Starčević in Dubrovnik, Dalmatia and that was published in 1891–1914.

== See also ==
- Frano Supilo
- Red Croatia

== Sources ==
- "Crvena Hrvatska" at proleksis.lzmk.hr (in Croatian)
