= Vukovci, Montenegro =

Vukovci Вуковци
- Village
- Location within Montenegro
- Country: Montenegro
- Municipality: Podgorica

Population (2011)
  - Total: 416
- Time zone: UTC+1 (CET)
  - Summer (DST): UTC+2 (CEST)

Vukovci (Montenegrin: Вуковци) is a village in the new Zeta Municipality of Montenegro. Until 2022, it was part of Podgorica Municipality.

== Demographics ==
According to the 2011 census, its population was 416.

Ethnicity in 2011
Ethnicity	Number	Percentage
Montenegrins	312	75.0%
Serbs	91	21.9%
other/undeclared	13	3.1%
Total	416	100%
