= Lekići =

Lekići Лекићи
- Village
- Location within Montenegro
- Country: Montenegro
- Municipality: Podgorica

Population (2011)
  - Total: 193
- Time zone: UTC+1 (CET)
  - Summer (DST): UTC+2 (CEST)

Lekići (Montenegrin Cyrillic: Лекићи) is a village in the municipality of Podgorica, Montenegro.

== Demographics ==
According to the 2011 census, its population was 193.

Ethnicity in 2011
| Ethnicity | Number | Percentage |
|---|---|---|
| Montenegrins | 149 | 77.2% |
| Serbs | 29 | 15.0% |
| other/undeclared | 15 | 7.8% |
| Total | 193 | 100% |
