= Red Croatia =

Historical region in Southeast Europe

Red Croatia (Latin: Croatia Rubea; Croatian: Crvena Hrvatska) is a historical term used for the southeastern parts of Roman Dalmatia and some other territories, including parts of present-day Montenegro, Albania, the Herzegovina region of Bosnia and Herzegovina and southeastern Croatia, stretching along the Adriatic Sea.

The term was first used in one version of the Chronicle of the Priest of Dioclea, which is as a whole dated to have been written in 1298–1300. It was in later years mentioned by a number of sources in various languages and by a number of people of different backgrounds. In the 19th century, during the Age of Romantic Nationalism, it became a central point of discussion and research, often a component part of Croatian nationalism, in which Red Croatia was sometimes popularized as a historical state of the Croatian people and thus should become part of a Greater Croatia.

== Etymology ==
Red Croatia was first mentioned in the Chronicle of the Priest of Dioclea a fictional work which was written by a Roman Catholic priest in Doclea. His work is not preserved in original, but only in copies since the 16th and 17th century, and has been dated from as early as the late 13th century to as far as the 15th century. It is most likely that it was written c. 1300. There were numerous erroneous guesses and other plain errors regarding the identity of the writer, the most known being referring to him as "Archbishop Gregory" of a non-existent Archbishopric.

Most recent and detailed research identifies him as a member of the Cistercian order by the name of Rudger, of Bohemian ethnic origins, working in the Archbishopric of Split and for Croatian Ban Paul Šubić who was from 1298 to 1301 Archbishop of Bar. If the Priest of Doclea didn't take the term from some unknown and unpreserved source while rewriting his work for a second edition and he is its inventor, it is believed that he did partially in political aspirations of the Šubić family over all Croat lands, which would also explain the lack of Red Croatia in the first version, which centered on Bosnia, the second one being written after Paul had taken the title "Lord of Bosnia".

Croatian linguist Petar Skok has defined that this misinterpretation on the Priest's part is a result of transliteration of the Crmnica or Crvnica area in Montenegro, which also translates to "Red Land".

According to the Dioclean priest imaginary kingdom of Slavs was divided into two regions: Maritima (Littoral) between Dinaric mountains and the Adriatic sea which was also defined as the area where the"rivers from the mountains flow south into the sea" and Serbia which encompassed everything between Dinaric mountains and the river Danube or as defined in the chronicle as the "region where the rivers flow from the mountains to the north into the mighty river of Danube." Thus the Maritima encompassed only the areas in the Adriatic sea drainage basin while Serbia encompassed areas in the Black sea ( Danube ) basin . Maritima was further divide in two areas: White and Red Croatia with latter encompassing present day Hercegovina, southern portion of Montenegro and northern Albania. On the other hand, Dioclean's Serbia would encompass most of present-day Serbia, northern part of Montenegro, most of the Bosnia and Croatia north of the Dinaric mountains.

== Original references ==
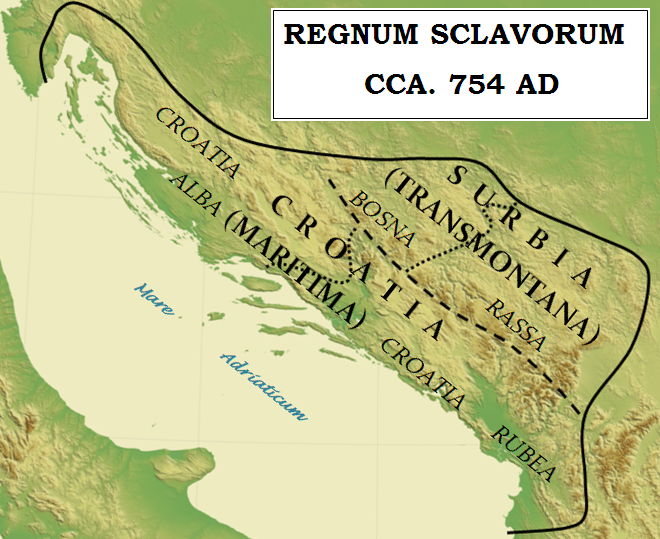
Map of fictituous Slavic kingdom of king Svetopelek in the Western Balkans as it has been described in the chronicle Chronicle of the Priest of Duklja.

The Latin version of the Chronicle of the Priest of Dioclea, known as Gesta regum Sclavorum, was translated by Croatian-Latin historian Ioannes Lucius (Ivan Lučić, the father of Croatian historiography) in 1666 and printed under the name De Regno Dalmatiae et Croatiae (On the Kingdom of Dalmatia and Croatia). The following is an excerpt (in Latin):

Post haec secundum continentiam priuiligiorum, quae lecta coram populo fuerant, scripsit priuilegia, diisit prouincias et regiones regni sui ac terminos et fines earum hoc modo: secundum cursum aquarum, quae a montanis fluunt et intrant in mare contra meridianam plagam, Maritima uocauit; aquas uero, quae a montanis fluunt contra septentrionalem plagam et intrant in magnum flumen Donaui, uocauit Surbia. Deinde Maritima in duas diuisit prouincias: a loco Dalmae, ubi rex tunc manebat et synodus tunc facta est, usque ad Ualdeuino uocauit Croatium Album, quae et inferior Dalmatia dicitur...Item ab eodem loco Dalmae usque Bambalonam ciuitatem, quae nunc dicitur Dyrachium, Croatiam Rubeam...

The following is the translation to English:

And from the field of Dalmae (Duvno) to the city of Dyrrachium (Durrës) is Red Croatia

== References in Dandolo's chronicle ==
Andrea Dandolo (1300–1354), the Venetian author of the Chronicle of Dalmatia, who writes of Croatian lands (Dalmatian Kingdom), reiterated the boundaries of Red Croatia:

In Latin:

Svethopolis rex Dalmacie... in plano Dalme coronatus est et regnum suum Dalmacie in IIIIor partes divisit... A plano intaque Dalme usque Ystriam, Chroaciam Albam, vocavit, et a dicto plano usque Duracium, Chroaciam Rubeam, et versus montana, a flumine Drino usque Maceodoniam, Rasiam; et a dicto flumine citra Bosnam nominavit... Moderni autem maritimam totam vocant Dalmaciam, montana autem Chroatiam...

Translation:

Svatopluk, King of Dalmatia... on Duvno field was crowned and his kingdom of Dalmatia is spread out into 4 regions: From the field called Duvno (Tomislavgrad), to Istria is called White Croatia... and from that field to Durrës is called Red Croatia; and the mountainous side from the river Drina to Macedonia is called Rascia, and to that river to here is called Bosnia. The whole sea coast is called Dalmatia and its mountains are Croatia...

== References by Flavio Biondo ==
Another writer confirms the diet of Duvno and the distribution of Croatian lands as well as the existence of Red Croatia. Flavio Biondo (1388–1463) was an Italian humanist. In his well-known book Historiarum ab inclinatione Romani imperii decades, he word for word confirms what Dandolo writes about the Duvno diet and White and Red Croatia.

== Use in the 19th and 20th century ==
Crvena Hrvatska was the name of a weekly Croatian Party of Rights political paper that spread the ideology of Ante Starčević in Dubrovnik, Dalmatia and that existed in between 1890 and 1899 Austria-Hungary, edited by Frano Supilo.

The term has come up in the discussion of the history of Montenegro. Croatian historian Ivo Pilar thought that Duklja arose from the lands of "Red Croatia" in the 10th century. Serbian historian Slavenko Terzić criticized Savić Marković Štedimlija for his references to Red Croati" used for separating Montenegrins from the Serbs.

== See also ==
- White Croatia
- Duklja
- Travunia
- Zahumlje
- History of Dalmatia
