= Savić Marković Štedimlija =

Montenegrin writer

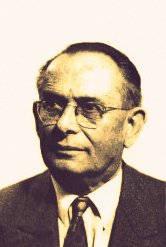
- Born: Savo Marković; 12 January 1906; Stijena Piperska, Montenegro
- Died: 25 January 1971 (aged 65); Zagreb, SR Croatia, Yugoslavia
- Occupations: Writer and publicist

Savić Marković Štedimlija (Serbian Cyrillic: Савић Марковић Штедимлија; 12 January 1906 – 25 January 1971) was a Montenegrin writer. He studied the history of Croatia and was an associate of the Lexicographic Institute in Zagreb. During his life, he authored more than 20 books and a number of articles, and also worked as a literary critic. Štedimlija is also known as editor-in-chief of publications promoting the Croatian Orthodox Church of the Ustaše regime.

== Biography ==
Štedimlija was born in Stijena Piperska, a small village of the Piperi Highland near Podgorica in the Principality of Montenegro. He attended the Gymnasium in Leskovac and moved to Zagreb in 1930. There he worked as a journalist and writer who published numerous articles and reviews on literature, politics and history in newspapers and periodicals. Štedimlija's articles on Montenegrin history complained about lost independence of the Kingdom of Montenegro after the Podgorica Assembly in 1918, and his articles on domestic policy of the Kingdom of Yugoslavia were influenced by Croatian nationalism of that time.

In 1941, after World War II in Yugoslavia started, he founded the Montenegrin National Committee of the Independent State of Croatia, a Nazi puppet state. A year later, he became editor-in-chief of publications promoting the Croatian Orthodox Church, a religious body created by the genocidal Ustaše regime. At the end of 1944 he escaped to the Ostmark of Nazi Germany, in 1945 he was arrested in the Soviet zone of Austria and deported to a Gulag in the USSR. After ten years of detention, he came back to SFR Yugoslavia in 1955, was prosecuted for fascist collaboration and sentenced to 8 years in prison for his political activities during the war. In 1959, he was already released on condition that he accepted the prohibition of publishing works under his name. In the 1960s he was a member of the Yugoslav Lexicographical Institute until he retired into private life. Savić Marković Štedimlija died in 1971 and was buried in Zagreb's Mirogoj Cemetery.

== Historiographical publications ==
He published his central theory on the origin of the Montenegrins for the first time in his books Red Croatia and Basics of Montenegrin Nationalism from 1937.

He explained in his fringe theory that Montenegrins were descendants of the "Croatian people", who would then have settled the old Montenegrin territory of Red Croatia. In his view, Montenegrin language would therefore have been "but a dialect of Croatian". The final point of that theory resulted in his assertion that the population had gradually been Serbianized over the following centuries. This theory was not Štedimlija's original idea, but its ideological roots go back to the late 19th century in the intellectual history of Croatian irredentism.

== Selected bibliography ==
- Gorštačka krv: Crna Gora 1918-1928 (Highlander's Blood: Montenegro 1918–1928), Belgrade 1928.
- Školovanje crnogorske omladine (Education of Montenegrin Youth), Zagreb 1936.
- Crna Gora u Jugoslaviji (Montenegro in Yugoslavia), Zagreb 1936.
- Crvena Hrvatska (Red Croatia), Zagreb 1937.
- Osnovi crnogorskog nacionalizma (The Basics of Montenegrin Nationalism), Zagreb 1937.
- Rusija i Balkan (Russia and the Balkans), Zagreb 1937.
- Crnogorsko pitanje (The Montenegrin Question), Zagreb 1941
- Auf dem Balkan (German; In the Balkans), Zagreb 1943.
- Verschwörungen gegen den Frieden (German; Conspiracies Against Peace), Zagreb 1944.
- Partizani o sebi: izvorni dokumenti o političkom podrijetlu partizana i o njihovom prebacivanju iz inozemstva na području Nezavisne Države Hrvatske (Partisans About Themselves: Original Documents on the Political Origins of the Partisans and Their Transfer to the Territory of the Independent State of Croatia from Abroad), Zagreb 1944.
- Deset godina u gulagu (Ten Years in the Gulag), Matica crnogorska, Podgorica 2004.
