= Stanjevića Rupa =

- Village
- Location within Montenegro
- Country: Montenegro
- Municipality: Podgorica

Population (2011)
  - Total: 211
- Time zone: UTC+1 (CET)
  - Summer (DST): UTC+2 (CEST)

Stanjevića Rupa (Montenegrin Cyrillic: Стањевића Рупа) is a village in the municipality of Podgorica, Montenegro. It is located near Spuž, Danilovgrad Municipality.

== Demographics ==
According to the 2011 census, its population was 211.

Ethnicity in 2011
Ethnicity	Number	Percentage
Montenegrins	128	60.7%
Serbs	52	24.6%
other/undeclared	31	14.7%
Total	211	100%
