= Draževina =

Draževina Дражевина
- Village
- Location within Montenegro
- Coordinates: 42°25′48″N 19°8′4″E
- Country: Montenegro
- Municipality: Podgorica

Population (2011)
  - Total: 14
- Time zone: UTC+1 (CET)
  - Summer (DST): UTC+2 (CEST)

Draževina (Montenegrin Cyrillic: Дражевина) is a small village in the municipality of Podgorica, Montenegro.

== Demographics ==
According to the 2003 census, it had a population of 22.

According to the 2011 census, its population was 14, 10 of them Montenegrins.
