= Iliko Lalev =

Iliko Lalev (Serbian Cyrillic: Илико Лалев, fl. 1658) was the vojvoda (chieftain) of Kuči. Iliko was the second of four sons of Lale Drekalov and a daughter or sister of a Bratonožići vojvoda, Pejo Stanojev. He had an older brother Vujoš, and younger brothers Čejo and Mijo. Iliko was mentioned in 1658. Kuči had been united under one vojvoda sometime in the 17th century. His brother Vujoš first inherited the title of Voivode, but unsatisfied with his descendants insubordinance, he passed it to Iliko. As Iliko accepted the title of vojvoda over the Kuči, he assembled an army, composed of Kuči, Bratonožići, Piperi and Kelmendi, and attacked Kolašin. In 1658, the seven tribes of Kuči, Vasojevići, Bratonožići, Piperi, Kelmendi, Hoti and Gruda allied themselves with the Republic of Venice, establishing the so-called "Seven-fold barjak" or "alaj-barjak", against the Ottomans. Iliko had three sons: Ivan, Petar and Mirčeta. All three brothers held the title of Voivode respectively. Ivan first succeeded Iliko, with his brother Petar succeeding him after his death, ending with Mirčeta who gained the title after Petar died fighting the Turks. Ivan's descendants formed the brotherhood of Ivanovići, Petar's formed the brotherhood of Petrovići and Mirčeta's, who was a priest (Serbian: pop), formed the brotherhood of Popovići. After Mirčeta's death the title of Voivode was inherited by his nephew, Petar's son Radonja.
