= Bytadosi =

Bythëdosi (also Bitidosi, Bitadosi; Cyrillic: Битидоси, Битадоси) was a historical noble Albanian tribe (fis) in the Middle Ages. They inhabited the Cem valley in the Brda (Montenegro) area in south-eastern Montenegro, north-east of Podgorica.

== Etymology ==
Bytadosi derive their name from their oldest known patrilineal ancestor, Bytados (Cyrillic: Бись Дось), recorded in the Dečani chrysobulls among the inhabitants of the Albanian (arbanas) katun (pastoral community) of Liesh Tuzi in 1330.

The name Bytados is a compound of two Albanian words: bythë, meaning "buttocks", and dosë, "pig": in Latin, podex porci. The name probably originated as a nickname that was accepted by the progenitor of the Bytadosi tribe. It was a common custom among Albanians to give their tribal chiefs vulgar nicknames. Another example of such a tradition is the Epirote tribe of Losha, whose name originated as a vulgar nickname from the Albanian word for pockmark-lios.

The use of "bythë" (butt) in nicknames appears in both Arbëresh and medieval Albanian naming traditions, suggesting deep historical roots. Names like Bithacakëla, Bithëzeza, Butharragat among the Arbëresh show a consistent pattern, likely descriptive or humorous in origin. Their presence in Arbëresh communities, who migrated in the 15th century, confirms this as an old Albanian custom.

The presence of vulgar names such as Svinoglav (Albanian: Kryethi) and Kryezezi (literally blackhead) among medieval Albanians suggests that such a tradition was common.

== History ==
They appear in historical record for the first time in 1330 in the Dečani chrysobulls as part of the Albanian (arbanas) katun (pastoral community) of Llesh Tuzi, that was situated somewhere around the medieval Župa (county) of Kuševo in Upper Zeta. Among the recorded inhabitants of the katun was a certain Bytados (Cyrillic: Бись Дось), who is most likely the progenitor of the Bythadosi clan. This katun included many communities that later formed their own separate communities: Mataguzi and his brothers, Reçi and his sons, Bushati and his sons, Pjetër Suma (ancestor of Gruda) and Pjetër Kuçi, first known ancestor of Kuči.

Another member of the Bytadosi clan, Pal Bitidosi (Cyrillic: Пав'ль Боусадоса), is mentioned in the Chrysobulls among the inhabitants of Kuševo, probably the son of Bytados from the katun. He later appears in Venetian records from 1335 as Paulus Busadosa, the leader of the Bytadosi (spelled in Venetian archives as Bisdos, Butadossi, Bitidossi, Busadossa) tribe.

Bytadosi settled the right bank of the Cem valley in medieval Upper Zeta (modern-day Montenegro) where they became a semi-independent community (katun or fis) and warrior band (ratnička družina) based on kinship ties of the same paternal ancestry. Since they were a powerful clan, they would often change oaths to various lords in their favor. Though originally vassals of Balšići, they would often side with the Venetians when it was in their favor.

In 1415, they appear in a union with the Hoti and Tuzi tribes (Осti, Tusi et Bitidossi). During the First Scutari War, the Bytadosi aligned themselves with the Venetians, fighting against the Balšići alongside their confederates. Due to their significant contributions during the war, on May 31, 1415, the Venetian Senate awarded 150 ducats to the Albanian nobility of Hoti, Tuzi, and Bythadosi, who had fiercely fought against Balša III.

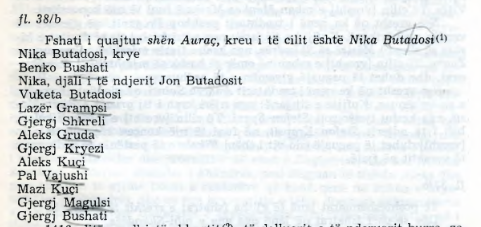
The Village of Shën Auraç in the Venetian cadastre of Shkodër 1416-7

In the 1416-17 Venetian cadastre of Shkodër, the surname Butadosi appears in the village of Shën Auraç. The head of the village was a certain Nikë Butadosi. The village also included another Nikë son of the at that point deceased Jon as well as Vuketë Butadosi among other villagers. In the cadastre the writer notes that the leader of the Bytidosi will be required to pay an extra 2 ducats on top of the 10 already being given each year. This is accompanied with a similar increase in wheat to 12 bags as well as an increase in concessions of millet and beans. The order is given by Albano Contareno, Nikolla Zanthani and Andrea Fuskulo.

Around the second half of the 15th century, the Bytadosi became part of the Kuči community (katun) and were thus not independently mentioned in the Zetan Choir of 1455.

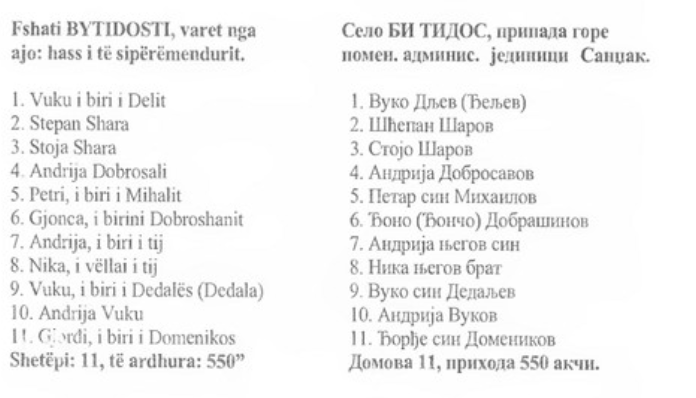
Bythadosi in the 1485 Defter of the Ishkodra Vilayet (Nahiya of Kuci)

In the 1485 defter of the Sanjak of Shkodër the village of Bytidosi is mentioned in the nahije of Kuči. The village included 11 households and could pay up to 550 ducats. The heads included the families of Stepan and Stoja Shara, Gjonça the son of Dobroshin along with his son Andrija and brother Nika, along with others such as Vuk son of Deli, Andrija Vuku and Petri son of Mihal. According to Robert Elsie, the village was situated in the modern-day village of Delaj in Trieshi (Zatrijebač).

In the 1497 defter of the Sanjak of Shkodër, the village of Bytidosi was enlarged with a community of 32 households that could pay up to 1181 ducats. In 1570, the village of Bytidosi was not recorded and by the 16th century its members became part of the Trieshi clan. The large Trieshan brotherhoods of Delaj and Bekaj (or Benkaj) are among the modern descendants of the Bytadosi clan.

== Genetics & Descendants ==
Big Y-700 results from members of the Delaj brotherhood in Triesh have shown that the Bytadosi clan belonged to the Albanian Paleo-Balkanic haplogroup R1b-FT49932>Y100058, with a common ancestor who lived in the 12th century. The Bekaj/Benkaj brotherhood of Triesh, originating from the village of Bekaj near the village of Delaj, has also been confirmed to belong to the same haplogroup branch, affirming the kinship between the Delaj and Bekaj brotherhoods and their common origin.

Further testing of brotherhoods across various tribes in the Cem valley has shown that some brotherhoods outside the Trieshi clan also descend from the Bytadosi. Among them are:

- Bekaj/Benkaj brotherhood of Triesh, according to tradition, are descendants of Marko Petrov (Mark Pjëtri), who settled in Triesh from Rijeka Crnojević (known as "The river of Ivan Beka"). The name of the brotherhood is said to derive from this connection. Marko Petrov is believed to have been a descendant of the Crnojević dynasty. Genetic testing has confirmed that the Bekaj brotherhood is indeed related to the neighboring Delaj brotherhood, sharing a common origin. As a result, the traditional account may be disregarded, and it is instead confirmed that both the Bekaj and Delaj brotherhoods are descendants of the medieval Bytadosi clan, which once inhabited the Triesh region.
- Lulgjuraj (Ljuljđurović) and Vulaj (Vulević) from the Gruda tribe. According to tradition, they are believed to be related to the Vuksangjelaj and Vučinić brotherhoods of the Gruda tribe. However, genetic testing has disproven this, as the two brotherhoods belong to a different haplogroup, J2b2-Y23094.
- Maraši (Marashi), one of the largest brotherhoods in the Zeta region, is traditionally believed to originate from the Hoti tribe, from where they fled to avoid converting to Catholicism. They maintain kinship ties with the Vuksanlekaj brotherhood of Hoti, with whom they claim to be related. However, genetic testing has disproven this tradition, revealing that the Maraši do not belong to the Hoti lineage but are part of the R1b branch of the Bytadosi. Despite this, the Maraši tradition may indicate that they did not descend from the Bytadosi of Triesh but from the Bytadosi who, in the 15th century, lived in the Shkodra plain near modern-day Koplik.
- Berisha from the Gruda tribe. They are traditionally believed to descend from the Berisha tribe of Northern Albania. They were once the leaders of the Gruda tribe, but as settlers from Suma (Albania) gained influence, leadership shifted to the Vuksangelaj brotherhood. Despite this historical tradition, genetic testing has confirmed that the Berisha brotherhood in Gruda are not genetically part of the Gruda tribe nor the Berisha tribe but instead belong to the medieval Bytadosi clan.(Not confirmed yet)
