= Farmaci =

Farmaci Фармаци
- Village
- Location within Montenegro
- Country: Montenegro
- Municipality: Podgorica

Population (2011)
  - Total: 462
- Time zone: UTC+1 (CET)
  - Summer (DST): UTC+2 (CEST)

Farmaci (Montenegrin Cyrillic: Фармаци) is a village in the municipality of Podgorica, Montenegro.

== Demographics ==
According to the 2011 census, its population was 462.

Ethnicity in 2011
Ethnicity	Number	Percentage
Montenegrins	271	58.7%
Serbs	134	29.0%
Macedonians	8	1.7%
other/undeclared	49	10.6%
Total	462	100%
