= Gjokaj =

Gjokaj is an Albanian surname of the Triepshi (tribe) clan of Malësia region of southeastern Montenegro. In Edith Durham’s book, she describes what was said by a Malësor of the Hot tribe in one of the many villages she explored in the highland regions of northern Albania in 1909:

“And half the tribe of Triepshi, the stem of Bakechi, is of Hoti blood. We cannot marry them. The other half–the Bekaj–we can. They are not our blood; they come from Kopliku. Triepshi belongs to Montenegro now, but is all Catholic.” (Durham, 1909)
