= Beri, Montenegro =

Beri Бери
- Village
- Location within Montenegro
- Country: Montenegro
- Municipality: Podgorica

Population (2011)
  - Total: 556
- Time zone: UTC+1 (CET)
  - Summer (DST): UTC+2 (CEST)

Beri (Montenegrin: Бери) is a village in the municipality of Podgorica, Montenegro.

== Demographics ==
According to the 2011 census, its population was 556.

Ethnicity in 2011
Ethnicity	Number	Percentage
Montenegrins	334	60.1%
Serbs	175	31.5%
other/undeclared	47	8.5%
Total	556	100%
