= Marko Čarapić =

Serbian voivode (1775–1826)

Marko Čarapić (Serbian Cyrillic: Марко Чарапић; 1775–1826) was a voivode in the First and Second Serbian Uprising. He was a member of the famed Čarapić family, memorialized in epic folk songs.

In 1826 another rebellion flared up in the Principality of Serbia aimed at Miloš Obrenović who took upon himself too many privileges. That rebellion became known as the Čarapić-Belisavljević Rebellion. Since it was also led by Mihailo (Mija) Belisavljević. Marko Čarapić and his brother Đorđe, the nephews of the hero of the First Serbian Uprising, Vasa Čarapić, were both executed by the Turks after the failed rebellion. Just like his uncle by the same name who was beheaded by the Turks, thus triggering the First Serbian Uprising.

== Sources ==
- Morison, W. A. (2012) [1942]. The Revolt of the Serbs Against the Turks: (1804–1813). Cambridge University Press. ISBN 978-1-107-67606-0.
- Petrovich, Michael Boro (1976). A history of modern Serbia, 1804–1918. Harcourt Brace Jovanovich. ISBN 978-0-15-140950-1.
- Ranke, Leopold von (1847). History of Servia, and the Servian Revolution: From Original Mss. and Documents. J. Murray.

== Literature ==
- Lazar Arsenijević Batalaka, Istorija srpskog ustanka (Belgrade, 1898)
- Konstantin N. Nenadović, Život i dela velikog Đorđa Petrovića Kara Đorđa Vrhovnog Vožda... (Vienna, 1884)
- Record of Karađorđe Petrović, Belgrade 1848;
- Record protocol of the letter priest Matija Nenadović on the war along the Drina in 1811, 1812, and 1813, Belgrade 1861;
- Memoirs of Matija Nenadović, Belgrade 1867;
- I. Stojšić, Jedna zaboravljena porodica, Naša nahija (almanah), Belgrade, 1926.
