= Velje Brdo =

Velje Brdo Веље Брдо
- Village
- Location within Montenegro
- Country: Montenegro
- Municipality: Podgorica

Population (2011)
  - Total: 319
- Time zone: UTC+1 (CET)
  - Summer (DST): UTC+2 (CEST)

Velje Brdo (Montenegrin Cyrillic: Веље Брдо) is a village in the municipality of Podgorica, Montenegro.

== Demographics ==
According to the 2011 census, its population was 319.

Ethnicity in 2011
Ethnicity	Number	Percentage
Montenegrins	199	62.4%
Serbs	87	27.3%
other/undeclared	33	10.3%
Total	319	100%
