= Convention of Dukagjin =

- Native name: Kuvendi i Dukagjinit
- Date: November 1601 -February 1602
- Location: Mat, Ottoman Empire (modern Albania)
- Organised by: Albanian leaders

Convention of Dukagjin or Assembly of Dukagjin (Alb. Kuvendi i Dukagjinit) was a convention of Albanian nobles and leaders held in the village of Macukull, in the Mati region, on November 1601, lasting to February 15, 1602. The convention was attended by 2656 representatives, and included both secular and religious representatives, from various Albanian districts. There were Albanians from the highlands of Shkodër, Zadrima, Dukagjin, Kosova, Lezha, Kurbin, Mirdita, Mat, Dibra, Petrela, Durrës, Elbasan, Shpat and from Myzeqe. The convention was headed by Nikollë Bardhi, Gjin Gjergji and Nikollë Mekajshi. The convention decided to wage war against the Ottoman Empire in an attempt of liberation. The decision was approved by 56 main leaders, consisting of 13 representatives who all sealed the act which the text “Sigillum Regni Macedonia et Albaniae” (The Seal of the Macedonian and Albanian Kingdom) with the double-headed eagle. Prior to this meeting, there had been the Convention of St. Maria in Mati in 1594, the Convention of Zadrima in 1598 and 1601 in Dukagjin. In 1608 another convention was held in Moraca and Dukagjin and in 1614, in Kuci.

The council sent two representatives to the Senate of Venice to gain aid and to present five chapters on the basis of which Albanians would declare their readiness to cooperate with the Republic in order to banish the Ottomans. The chapters included demands of protection, political support, military aid and lowered taxes. The Albanians requested a local autonomy under Venice and would not accept a transformation from one invader to another. On July 25, 1601, Nikollë Mekjashi wrote from Dukagjin to the cardinal in Rome saying that there were annual incursions on the behalf of the Ottomans against Dukagjin, during the time when the Convention was taking place. Local beys plundered valuable items and animals in the local regions. The Dukagjini tribes managed to defeat the Ottoman army of Mustafa Pasha of Dibra who had 6000 men and was forced to retreat. The highlanders requested military aid by the sea. Venice never aided the Albanians as the risk of Ottoman reprisals towards the Republic was too high. Several years later, more anti-Ottoman conventions were held.

== See also ==
- Ottoman Albania
- Convention of Mat
- League of Lezhë
- Holy League (1594)
- Albanian revolt of 1432–1436
