= Lucaj =

Albanian surname

Lucaj (/ˈluːts aɪ/; Albanian: [ˈluts ˈaj]; is an Albanian family and surname of the Triesh clan in Malësia. The Lucaj family are historically the head of the Triesh clan, known as bajraktars. The family has been in the region for hundreds of years with the earliest recording of the family name appearing in the Sanjak of Scutari in 1485, listed under the ancient tribe of Bankeq. The last name itself is patronymic and directly translates as "the son of Luca".

== History ==
The Lucajs are direct descendants from Ban Keqi who is the founder of the village Triesh. Ban Keqi was the brother of Lazar Keqi, the founder of the village of Hoti. The known lineage of the family stems back to before the Ottoman invasion of the Northern Albanian highlands. The Treaty of Berlin in 1878 caused Triesh, and subsequently the Lucaj family, to annex into the border of Montenegro, which is where Triesh is still located today. Due to having to register with a predominantly Slavic government most of the family members last names were changed to Ljucovic to assimilate into the different language. Today, most of the Lucaj family has immigrated to the United States of America, mostly in the cities of New York City and Detroit.
