= Ubli, Podgorica =

Ubli Убли
- Village
- Location within Montenegro
- Coordinates: 42°29′26″N 19°23′45″E
- Country: Montenegro
- Municipality: Podgorica
- Elevation: 476 m (1,562 ft)

Population (2011)
  - Total: 227
- Time zone: UTC+1 (CET)
  - Summer (DST): UTC+2 (CEST)
- Postal code: 81205
- Area code: 020
- Vehicle registration: PG

Ubli (Montenegrin Cyrillic: Убли) is a settlement in Podgorica Municipality, Montenegro. It is the historical seat of the Kuči clan.

Ubli consists of a town centre and a few villages. The town centre includes a local chancellery, a cultural hall, Police station, Health centre, market, local pubs, elementary school "Đoko Prelević" (70 students), etc. During the 80's, in the center of Ubli worked bike-alums (wheels) factory, which was a part of Aluminium Plant Podgorica.

The villages which are part of Ubli are Pavićevići, Prelevići, Kostrovići, Živkovići and Rajovići. The most inhabited ones are Prelevići, Živkovići and Pavićevići. In the villages there exists two Orthodox churches and a local graveyard.

== Demographics ==
According to 2003 census, Ubli had 355 residents, making it the most populated area in the highland region of Kuči. Montenegrins constitute the majority with 178 (52,19%), while Serbs number 147 (43,10%). 166 inhabitants are men and 175 are women. Today, Ubli had 80 households and 170 houses and buildings.

In the 1948 census, Ubli had 616 inhabitants. At 1953, Ubli had 610 inhabitants, and in 1961 - 520. In the 1981 census, population of Ubli was 493, and at 1991, there was 339 inhabitants.

According to the 2011 census, its population was 227.

Ethnicity in 2011
Ethnicity	Number	Percentage
Serbs	147	64.8%
Montenegrins	73	32.2%
other/undeclared	7	3.1%
Total	227	100%

== Surrounding areas ==
Ubli borders to nine smaller villages: in the south, Koći; west and southwest Bezjovo, Cvilin and Orahovo; north Momče, and from the east, southeast and northeast are Ubalac, Zagreda, Kosor, Dučići and Liješta. Medun, a Roman town and birthplace of duke Marko Miljanov is situated four kilometres west of Ubli, while the distance to central Podgorica is 12 kilometres.
