= Gornji Kokoti =

Gornji Kokoti Горње Стравче
- Village
- Location within Montenegro
- Coordinates: 42°23′51″N 19°10′29″E
- Country: Montenegro
- Municipality: Podgorica

Population (2011)
  - Total: 74
- Time zone: UTC+1 (CET)
  - Summer (DST): UTC+2 (CEST)

Gornji Kokoti (Montenegrin Cyrillic: Горњи Кокоти) is a village in the municipality of Podgorica, Montenegro.

== Demographics ==
According to the 2003 census, it had a population of 73.

According to the 2011 census, its population was 74.

Ethnicity in 2011
Ethnicity	Number	Percentage
Montenegrins	62	83.8%
Serbs	10	13.5%
other/undeclared	2	2.7%
Total	74	100%
