= Triepshi (tribe) =

Region in Montenegro; historic Albanian tribe

Coordinates: 42°26′N 19°27′E

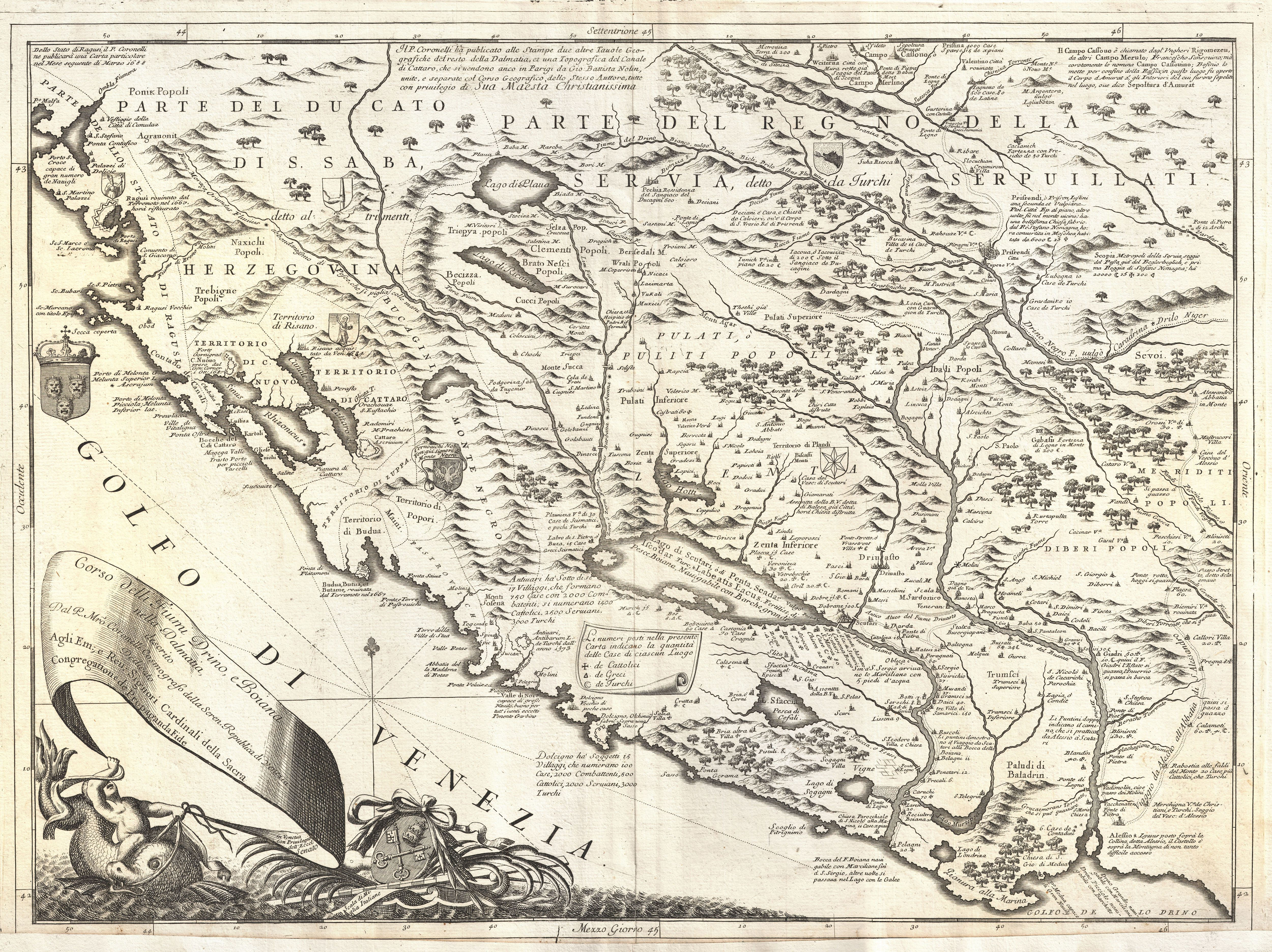
Trieshi and Trieshjant (the people of Trieshi) in 1688 by Venetian cartographer, Vincenzo Coronelli

Trieshi is a historical Albanian tribe (fis) and region (Montenegrin: Zatrijebač, Затријебач) in Montenegro above the right bank of the Cem river near the Albanian border in Tuzi Municipality. It is part of the region of Malësia.

== Geography ==
Trieshi lies in the municipality of Tuzi on the Albania-Montenegro border as the Cem crosses into Montenegro after Grabom along the river's right bank. It has a total territory of about 30 km^{2} and all of its settlements are in mountainous terrain with little arable land. The settlements of Trieshi are: Nikmaraš, Rudine, Muzhečka, Budza, Poprat, Stjepoh, Deljaj, Bekaj, Ljopar, Zatrijebačka Cijevna. In terms of historical territory, Trieshi borders Hoti to the south-west, Kelmendi to the east, Gruda to the west and Koja e Kuçit/Kučka krajina to the north.

== Origins ==
Oral traditions and fragmentary stories were collected and interpreted by writers who travelled in the region in the 19th century about the early history of Triepshi. In the 20th century, an interdisciplinary approach of comparative anthropology in the context of recorded historical material has yielded more historically-grounded accounts.

Triepshi is not a fis (tribe) of the same patrilineal ancestry. More than half of Triepshi claims direct patrilineal descent from Ban Keqi, who in oral tradition is the founder of Triepshi and brother of Lazër Keqi, founder of Hoti. Another part of the tribe, Delaj descends from Bitdosi (Bitidossi), another medieval Albanian tribe in the region. Bekaj is recorded as coming in as a result of blood feud from Rijeka Crnojevića, in the early Ottoman times better known as Rijeka Ivan Beka'. Edith Durham in High Albania (1908) recorded another story, which placed the original location of Bekaj in Koplik. In oral tradition, Bumçe, the wife of the progenitor of Kelmendi came from the Bekaj brotherhood.

Other brotherhoods (Anas) that were already settled in Triepshi at the time of its formation descended from tribes that now are further south in Shkodër County like Plani and Xhani/Xhaj. Thus, within Triepshi, brotherhoods that didn't have the same patrilineal ancestry could intermarry, but they didn't intermarry with tribes with which they shared the same direct ancestor. For example, more than half of Triepshi didn't intermarry with Hoti.

Johann Georg von Hahn recorded one of the first oral traditions about Triepshi from a Catholic priest named Gabriel in Shkodra in 1850. According to it the first direct male ancestor of the Triepshi was Ban Keq, son of a Catholic Albanian, Keq who fleeing from Ottoman conquest settled in a Slavic-speaking area that would become the historical Piperi region. His sons, the brothers Lazër Keqi (ancestor of Hoti), Ban Keqi (ancestor of Trieshi), Merkota Keqi, Kaster Keqi and Vas Keqi (ancestor of Vasojevići) had to abandon the village after committing murder against the locals, but Keq and his younger son Piper Keqi remained there and Piper Keqi became the direct ancestor of the Piperi tribe. In the story, Ban Keqi settled in the same region - that would become Triepshi - with his brother Lazër, who later moved southwards and founded Hoti. Thus, Ban Keqi became the first direct male ancestor of Triepshi. The patronymic surname of Keq is recorded in differing accounts as Preka, Ponti and Panta. The name of the first ancestor, Keq, which means bad in Albanian, is given in Malësia to only children or to children from families with very few children (due to infant mortality). In those families, an "ugly" name (i çudun) was given as a spoken talisman to protect the child from the "evil eye.

== History ==
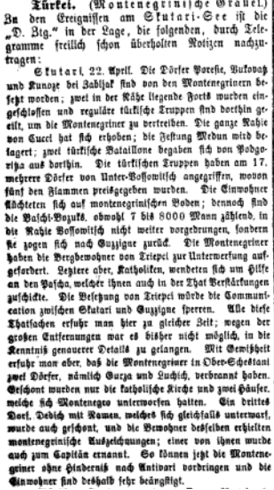
Newspiece of attack against Trieshi and Koja by Montenegro in the Austro-Hungarian newspaper Tagespost Graz, May 14 1862.

Bitidosi (spelled in Venetian archives as Bisdos, Butadossi, Bitidossi, Busadossa) is recorded in 1335 and its leader Paulus Busadosa is recorded. In 1415, they appear in a union with the Hoti and Tuzi tribes (Осti, Tusi et Bitidossi). In the defter of the Sanjak of Scutari, in the nahiya of Kuči in 1485, the settlement of Bitidosi appears with 11 households from which the brotherhood of Delaj springs.

In the Dečani chrysobulls of 1330, the micro-toponym Bьnьkekjeve glade ("Bankeqi's hut") is attested in the region of eastern Montenegro bordering modern Vermosh in Kelmend, north-western Albania. This is the first recorded mention of the Albanian Bankeqi (from the founder Ban Keqi, also mentioned in oral tradition) which, at this point, had yet to become fully territorialized and appears to have been organized as a katun (semi-nomadic pastoral community). The settlement of Bankeq also appears in the aforementioned Ottoman defter with 11 households. The appearance of this settlement suggests that the Bankeqi had started to become territorialized and settled in this region of eastern Montenegro following the Ottoman occupation, gradually abandoning their previous semi-nomadic pastoralist way of life. A common trend for the Albanian tribes. Bankeq is recorded again in the following Ottoman defter of 1582 where mixed Albanian-Slavic anthroponyms now dominated over typical Albanian personal names, an indication of increasing Slavic influence in the greater region. Over half of the brotherhoods of Trieshi trace their ancestry back to the Bankeqi.

Trieshi is remembered for its resistance to Ottoman incursions in the region, in particular in 1717 when they killed 62 Ottoman soldiers. After their defeat, Ottoman forces were forced to retreat from the region until 1862. The Ottoman battle left Triesh with a disdain for their Muslim neighbors. As stated by Robert Elsie, a well known Albanoligist, the Trieshjan would constantly perturb the towns of Podgorica and Guci, and due to their "warlike nature" would lie in wait to ambush and kill Muslim caravans. Based on tactical reasons, at this time the Trieshi had good relations with Kuči tribe and the Petrović-Njegoš dynasty, the rulers of Montenegro. Robert Elsie recounts a story about Trieshi men going to Cetinje in order to bring the vladika the heads of Ottomans that they had cut off in battles in return for rewards and gifts. This had changed by the 19th century with the creation of Montenegro and its southwards expansion against Catholic Albanian communities. In the Montenegrin–Ottoman War (1861–62), Kuči, Piperi and other groups attacked Trieshi and Koja e Kuçit, but that attack was repulsed.

As well as fighting with the Ottoman Empire, Triesh also warred with the neighboring Hoti tribe after they made advancements to gain Trieshjan land. In 1849, Hoti had 400 warriors while Triesh only had 80, but ultimately army size would not equate to success. Over time, there were several skirmishes and by the end of the conflict, Hoti had sustained severe casualties while Triesh had lost not nearly as many men. In the end, Hoti offered Triesh a golden saddle, as a sign of surrender and a peace offering. The Trieshjant refused the offering, but did not continue their war with Hoti.

The area of Trieshi and Koja e Kuçit were formally ceded by the Ottomans to Montenegro in 1878 at a time of the Congress of Berlin, but the border remained vague until the end of WW. Some of the Trieshi then fled to nearby Gruda whereas a part remained in Montenegro. An agreement was reached around 1900 and they returned to their villages. As of 2018, Triesh is part of Tuzi Municipality.

== Traditions ==
The ruins of its oldest church are in Budëz, but by the 17th century it was in ruins. Pjetër Bogdani writes in 1672 that the parish had no priest and needed missionaries and a school teacher. The church of Triesh (kisha e Trieshit) at that period has a register since 1753, the earliest confirmed date of the building's use. The information about the parish of Trieshi in 1745 is also the earliest exact information on the population figures of the tribe. It had 84 households with 580 Catholic believers.

The funerary customs of Trieshi as those of Malësia in general include the lamentation (gjamë) of the deceased in a collective manner by a group of men (gjamatarë).

== Brotherhoods ==
The noted families of Triesh as recorded by Emile Wiet, the French consul in Shkodër in 1866

* Arapaj	* Gjurashaj	* Prënkoçaj
* Cacaj	* Gjuravçaj	* Ujkaj (bajraktar)
* Dedivanaj	* Hasanaj	* Vataj
* Dukaj	* Lekaj	
* Gashaj	* Lekoçaj	
* Gegaj	* Lucaj (bajraktar)	
* Gjeloshaj	* Margilaj	
* Gjekaj	* Memçaj	
* Gjokaj	* Micakaj	
* Gjolaj	* Nikollaj	
* Gjonlekaj	* Nikprelaj	
* Gjonaj	* Palushaj	
