= Lale Drekalov =

Montenegrin Kuči leader

- voivode of Kuči
- Noble family: Drekalović
- Father: Drekale

Lale Drekalov (Serbian Cyrillic: Дрекале; Albanian: Lala Drekali) was a vojvoda of the Kuči tribe in eastern Montenegro in the first half of the 17th century.

== Life ==
His father was Drekale and his mother was the daughter of a vojvoda of Old Kuči. He had a brother, Nikola who died with his father in a raid by Kelmendi. The memory of the event has been retained in the folk poem and song Pogibija vojvode Drekala i njegova osveta (The death of vojvoda Drekale and his revenge) that was recorded in the 1930s. A gravestone was placed in 1979 in Rikavačko Jezero, very close to the Montenegro-Albania border, where he is thought to have died. The earliest description of him is in the report of the Venetian Mariano Bolizza, who travelled in the lands of modern Montenegro and northern Albania to document possible trade routes to Istanbul. In his report, Bolizza notes that Lale Drecalou and Nico Raizcou (Niko Rajckov) were the commanders of the Catholic Albanian Kuči (Chuzzi Albanesi) which had 490 households and 1,500 men-in-arms described as very war-like and courageous. This community had settled in the area of Kuči in the 16th century under Drekale's command. They were among the highland communities that actively fought against the Ottoman Empire; others included Vasojevići, Bjelopavlići, Kelmendi and Hoti. He appears to have taken part in various assemblies of coordination against the Ottomans.

In 1608, he participated in a meeting of Serbian Patriarch Jovan II Kantul in the Morača monastery. In 1614, he was one of the chief participants and organizers of the assembly of Kuči. In that assembly 44 leaders mostly from northern Albania and Montenegro took part to organize an insurrection against the Ottomans and ask for assistance by the Papacy. Gjon Renësi had undertaken the task of presenting the decisions of the assembly to the Papacy. It was followed by an assembly in Prokuplje in 1616 and another one in 1620 in Belgrade, where he appears as one of the participants.

He is buried in the courtyard of the church of Ljes, in Kuci. A turkey oak tree stands on his grave. Folk tradition maintains that it was planted the day he was buried. That is why it's called Ljaljev cer (Lale's cerrus).

== Conversion ==
Lale Drekalov was born and raised as Roman Catholic. At some point in the first half of the 17th century he converted to Orthodoxy. The actual date of his conversion is a matter historical dispute. Marko Miljanov, himself a direct descendant of Lale Drekalov through the Popovići brotherhood, mentions that he converted after an agreement with Ruvim IV Boljević, Metropolitan of Cetinje. As Ruvim IV lived after the probable life span of Lale Drekalov, Ruvim III Njeguš who played a key role in the conversion of Kuči and Bratonožići to Orthodoxy is the more historically grounded alternative as Jovan Erdeljanović and Sima Milutinović Sarajlija have pointed out. Drekalov's conversion was soon followed by a gradual conversion of all Catholics of Kuči. As Francesco Bolizza notes in a letter to Cardinal Caponi in 1649, about three or four Catholic villages remained in Kuči under the jurisdiction of the Franciscan mission of Gruda.

The date of conversion also coincides with his second marriage. He was first married to unnamed woman from Kastrati with whom he had one son, Vuko. He then married a relative of the Bratonožići vojvoda. In the more historically grounded version she was the daughter of vojvoda Stanoje Radonjin and sister of Pejo Stanojev Balević. With his second wife had four sons: Vujoš, Iliko, Čejo and Mijo, progenitors of the big Kuči brotherhoods: Vujoševići, Ilikovići. Čejovići and Mijovići. The brotherhood of Ilikovići was further diversified thus the surname disappeared, whilst Vuko because of the dispute with his half-brothers settled in Podgorica and converted to Islam, his descendants being known as Turkovići. Lale Drekalov was first succeeded by his oldest son Vujoš as Voivode, but the position was later transferred to Iliko. After his death begins the branching of the Drekalovići into a union of brotherhoods as opposed to being a single brotherhood.

The event of the wedding has also been recorded as folk story with a metaphorical segment where the vojvoda of Bratonožići presents Lale with his famous mace as a gift, only to be later warned by his kinsmen that with the mace he handed over all the prosperity of the Bratonožići tribe to Lale as well. The story illustrates the exploits of Lale, since under him and his sons Kuči became the largest and most powerful tribe in the Montenegrin Highlands.

== Sources ==
Preceded by Drekale	Voivode of Kuči first half of the 17th century	Succeeded by Vujoš Lalev
