= Crnci, Podgorica =

Crnci Црнци Crncë
- Village
- Location within Montenegro
- Country: Montenegro
- Municipality: Podgorica

Population (2011)
  - Total: 182
- Time zone: UTC+1 (CET)
  - Summer (DST): UTC+2 (CEST)

Crnci (Montenegrin Cyrillic: Црнци; Albanian: Crncë) is a village in the municipality of Podgorica, Montenegro.

== Demographics ==
According to the 2011 census, its population was 182.

Ethnicity in 2011
| Ethnicity | Number | Percentage |
|---|---|---|
| Montenegrins | 114 | 62.6% |
| Serbs | 50 | 27.5% |
| Albanians | 13 | 7.1% |
| other/undeclared | 5 | 2.7% |
| Total | 182 | 100% |
