= Brežine =

Brežine Брежине
- Village
- Location within Montenegro
- Country: Montenegro
- Municipality: Podgorica

Population (2011)
  - Total: 100
- Time zone: UTC+1 (CET)
  - Summer (DST): UTC+2 (CEST)

Brežine (Montenegrin Cyrillic: Брежине) is a village in the municipality of Podgorica, Montenegro.

== Demographics ==
According to the 2011 census, its population was 100.

Ethnicity in 2011
Ethnicity	Number	Percentage
Montenegrins	67	67.0%
Serbs	22	22.0%
other/undeclared	11	11.0%
Total	100	100%
