= Convention of Mat =

- Native name: Kuvendi i Matit
- Date: 7 November 1594
- Location: Mat, Ottoman Empire (modern Albania)
- Organised by: Albanian leaders

The Convention of Mat was organized on 7 November 1594 by Albanian leaders fighting against the Ottoman Empire. Mat was chosen as the place of the meeting due to its role in Albanian revolts of the 16th century. The aim was a better organization of the revolts to achieve independence from the Ottoman Empire. The convention decided that help should be sought from the Pope, and for negotiations were chosen Tom Plezha, Mark Gjini and Nikollë Mekajshi. However, the Pope refused to give help, claiming that it was not the right time to fight the Ottoman Empire. Another decision of Albanian leaders was to not let the Republic of Venice know about their plans as the latter did not want to open a new conflict with the Ottomans. The news came out and Venetians managed to divide the organizers of the convention between themselves. In the following two years, Albanian leaders continued their work to get help from Christian powers, taking heart from geopolitical circumstances. In 1596, 10,000 men marched towards Vlora in hope of receiving arms from Spain but the arms sent were confiscated by Venetians. The events damaged the relations between Albanian leaders and Christian powers but did not weaken the efforts for independence.

== See also ==
- Ottoman Albania
- League of Lezhë
- Holy League (1594)
- Convention of Dukagjin

== Sources ==
- Instituti i Historisë (Akademia e Shkencave e RSH) (2004). Historia e popullit shqiptar. Toena.
- Aleks Buda (1985). Fjalor enciklopedik shqiptar. Akademia e Shkencave e RPSSH.
- Jehona. 1969.
