= Fundina =

Fundina Фундина Fundinë
- Village
- Location within Montenegro
- Country: Montenegro
- Municipality: Podgorica

Population (2011)
  - Total: 237
- Time zone: UTC+1 (CET)
  - Summer (DST): UTC+2 (CEST)

Fundina (Montenegrin Cyrillic: Фундина; Albanian: Fundinë) is a village in the municipality of Podgorica, Montenegro.

== Etymology ==
The name Fundina derives from Albanian literally meaning "end or ending point" from "fund"(end) and "ina" suffix.

== Demographics ==
According to the 2011 census, its population was 237.

Ethnicity in 2011
| Ethnicity | Number | Percentage |
|---|---|---|
| Albanians | 156 | 65.8% |
| Montenegrins | 39 | 16.5% |
| Serbs | 34 | 14.3% |
| other/undeclared | 8 | 3.4% |
| Total | 237 | 100% |
