= Raći =

Raći Раћи
- Settlement
- Location within Montenegro
- Country: Montenegro
- Municipality: Podgorica

Population (2011)
  - Total: 30
- Time zone: UTC+1 (CET)
  - Summer (DST): UTC+2 (CEST)

Raći (Montenegrin Cyrillic: Раћи) is a settlement in the municipality of Podgorica, Montenegro.

Momir Bulatović is buried in Raći.

== Demographics ==
According to the 2011 census, its population was 30.
