= Gornje Stravče =

Gornje Stravče Горње Стравче
- Village
- Location within Montenegro
- Coordinates: 42°33′51″N 19°27′43″E
- Country: Montenegro
- Municipality: Podgorica

Population (2011)
  - Total: 10
- Time zone: UTC+1 (CET)
  - Summer (DST): UTC+2 (CEST)

Gornje Stravče (Montenegrin Cyrillic: Горње Стравче) is a village in Podgorica, the capital and largest city of Montenegro.

== Demographics ==
According to the 2011 census, it had a population of 10.
