= Stijena, Montenegro =

Stijena
- Village
- Location within Montenegro
- Country: Montenegro
- Municipality: Podgorica

Population (2011)
  - Total: 457
- Time zone: UTC+1 (CET)
  - Summer (DST): UTC+2 (CEST)

Stijena (Montenegrin Cyrillic: Стијена) is a village in the municipality of Podgorica, Montenegro.

== Demographics ==
According to the 2011 census, its population was 457.

Ethnicity in 2011
Ethnicity	Number	Percentage
Montenegrins	238	52.1%
Serbs	163	35.7%
Albanians	11	2.4%
other/undeclared	45	9.8%
Total	457	100%
