= Mrke =

Mrke Мрке
- Village
- Location within Montenegro
- Country: Montenegro
- Municipality: Podgorica

Population (2011)
  - Total: 207
- Time zone: UTC+1 (CET)
  - Summer (DST): UTC+2 (CEST)

Mrke (Montenegrin Cyrillic: Мрке) is a village in the municipality of Podgorica, Montenegro.

== Demographics ==
According to the 2011 census, its population was 207.

Ethnicity in 2011
Ethnicity	Number	Percentage
Montenegrins	118	57.0%
Serbs	60	29.0%
other/undeclared	29	14.0%
Total	207	100%
