= Đorđe Čarapić =

Serbian voivode

Đorđe Čarapić (1773-1826) was a voivode in the First Serbian Uprising and Second Serbian Uprising. He served both leaders – Karađorđe and Miloš Obrenović – during the war of Serbian independence from the Ottoman Empire. When Miloš tried to impose his power over the Governing State Council, he met with stiff resistance from Đorđe Čarapić, a previous participant in Djak's Rebellion, and Mihailo (Mija) Belisavljević.

The Čarapić-Belisavljević Rebellion was far more limited in scope than the previous one; it involved only a small circle of relatives, local leaders, and the peasants of some five villages.
