= Liješta =

Liješta Лијешта
- Village
- Location within Montenegro
- Country: Montenegro
- Municipality: Podgorica

Population (2011)
  - Total: 102
- Time zone: UTC+1 (CET)
  - Summer (DST): UTC+2 (CEST)

Liješta (Montenegrin Cyrillic: Лијешта) is a village in the municipality of Podgorica, Montenegro.

== Demographics ==
According to the 2011 census, its population was 125.

Ethnicity in 2011
Ethnicity	Number	Percentage
Montenegrins	4	
Serbs	121	
other/undeclared	0	
Total	125	100%
