= Nikollë Mekajshi =

Albanian Franciscan Roman Catholic prelate

Seal of Nikoll Mekajshi

Nikollë Mekajshi (Italian: Nicolò Mechaischi, Latin: Mecansius) was a Franciscan Roman Catholic prelate who served as bishop of Stephanium, a region in central Albania. He took part in the Convention of Mat in 1594, and was a member of the delegation that negotiated with Pope.

== Life ==
Born in the area of Durrës, Mekajshi served as bishop of Stephanium (Shtjefni), a region located between northern Elbasan and Mat District. In 1601-1602 he and Nikollë Bardhi unsuccessfully tried to instigate an armed uprising against the Ottoman Empire. In 1609-10 he sent another proposal to Pope Paul V regarding an anti-Ottoman revolt. According to his plan 50,000 Catholic and Orthodox Albanian troops with support from Philip III of Spain would begin a revolt with the aim of removing Ottoman rule from the country. By 1610, when he assisted archbishop Marin Bici, during the preparation of his report on the Catholic population of the area Mekajshi had become the last remaining Catholic bishop in the Archdiocese of Durrës.
