= Podgorica Capital City =

Municipality of Montenegro

Podgorica Capital City Glavni grad Podgorica Главни град Подгорица
- Municipality
- Coat of arms

- Podgorica Capital City area in Montenegro
- Country: Montenegro
- Seat: Podgorica
- Number of settlements: 141

Area
  - Total: 1,441 km^{2} (556 sq mi)

Population (2023)
  - Total: 180,186
  - Density: 125.0/km^{2} (323.9/sq mi)
- Time zone: UTC+01:00 (CET)
- Postal code: 81 000 – 81 124
- Area code: +382 20
- ISO 3166 code: ME-16
- License plate: PG
- Website: podgorica.me

Podgorica Capital City (Montenegrin: Glavni grad Podgorica / Главни град Подгорица) is one of the territorial subdivisions of Montenegro. The seat of municipality is the city of Podgorica. Podgorica municipality covers 10.4% of Montenegro's territory and is home to 29.9% of the country's population. It is the nation's administrative centre and its economic and educational focus.

== Administration ==
As with other Montenegrin municipalities, the city and the municipality of Podgorica are governed by the same Mayor and City Assembly, which together act as a Capital City government. The city assembly has 60 members, elected directly for four-year terms. The Mayor of Podgorica is the head of the City of Podgorica, acts on behalf of the city, and performs an executive function in the Podgorica Capital City municipality.

=== City Assembly (2024–2028) ===
Party/Coalition	Seats	Local government
DPS	19 / 59	Opposition
ZBCG (NSD–DNP)	11 / 59	Government
PES	8 / 59	Government
DCG	6 / 59	Government
PzPG	4 / 59	Government
ES (SD–SDP)	3 / 59	Opposition
URA	2 / 59	Opposition
PREOKRET	2 / 59	Opposition
SEP	2 / 59	Opposition
SNP	1 / 59	Government
UCG	1 / 59	Government

=== Subdivisions ===
The entire municipality of Podgorica is divided into 66 local communities (Montenegrin Latin: mjesne zajednice, singular: mjesna zajednica), bodies in which the citizens participate in decisions on matters of relevance to the local community.

There are 85 village settlements in the territory:

- Baloči
- Begova Glavica
- Beri
- Bezjovo
- Bigor
- Bioče
- Blizna
- Bolesestra
- Brežine
- Briđe
- Brskut
- Buronji
- Ćafa
- Ćepetići
- Crnci
- Crvena Paprat
- Cvarin
- Dolovi
- Donje Stravče
- Donji Kokoti
- Draževina
- Dučići
- Duga
- Duške
- Đurkovići
- Farmaci
- Fundina
- Goljemadi
- Gornje Stravče
- Gornji Kokoti
- Gradac
- Grbavci
- Grbi Do
- Kiselica
- Klopot
- Kopilje
- Kornet
- Kosor
- Kruse
- Kržanja
- Lekići
- Liješnje
- Liješta
- Lijeva Rijeka
- Lopate
- Lutovo
- Lužnica
- Medun
- Mileti
- Momče
- Mrke
- Opasanica
- Orahovo
- Oraovice
- Orasi
- Ožezi
- Parci
- Pelev Brijeg
- Petrovići
- Prisoja
- Progonovići
- Raći
- Radeća
- Radovče
- Releza
- Rijeka Piperska
- Seoca
- Seoštica
- Sjenice
- Slacko
- Staniselići
- Stanjevića Rupa
- Stijena
- Stupovi
- Trmanje
- Tuzi Ljevorečke
- Ubalac
- Ubli
- Velje Brdo
- Verula
- Vidijenje
- Vilac
- Vrbica
- Zagreda
- Zaugao

== Geography and location ==
The municipality of Podgorica is located in central eastern part of Montenegro, covering an area of 1,441 km^{2}, thus being the second largest Montenegrin municipality, after Nikšić. It occupies the area north of Lake Skadar, including the entire Zeta Plain, and stretches north into the sparsely populated Dinaric Alps. Thus, the municipality occupies geographically very diverse area, ranging from the fertile lowlands in the south, to the rugged mountain ranges in the north.

== Demographics ==
Podgorica municipality can be viewed as the metropolitan area of the city of Podgorica. Population of the municipality was 179,505 at 2023 census.

Historical population
Year	Pop.	±%
1948	48,599	—
1953	55,669	+14.5%
1961	72,319	+29.9%
1971	98,796	+36.6%
1981	132,290	+33.9%
1991	146,121	+10.5%
2003	169,132	+15.7%
2011	185,937	+9.9%

Ethnicity (2023)	Number	Percentage
Montenegrins	97,894	54.54%
Serbs	55,365	30.84%
Bosniaks	4,697	2.62%
Romani	3,431	1.91%
Albanians	1,780	0.99%
ethnic Muslims	1,559	0.87%
Others	14,779	8.23%

== Gallery ==
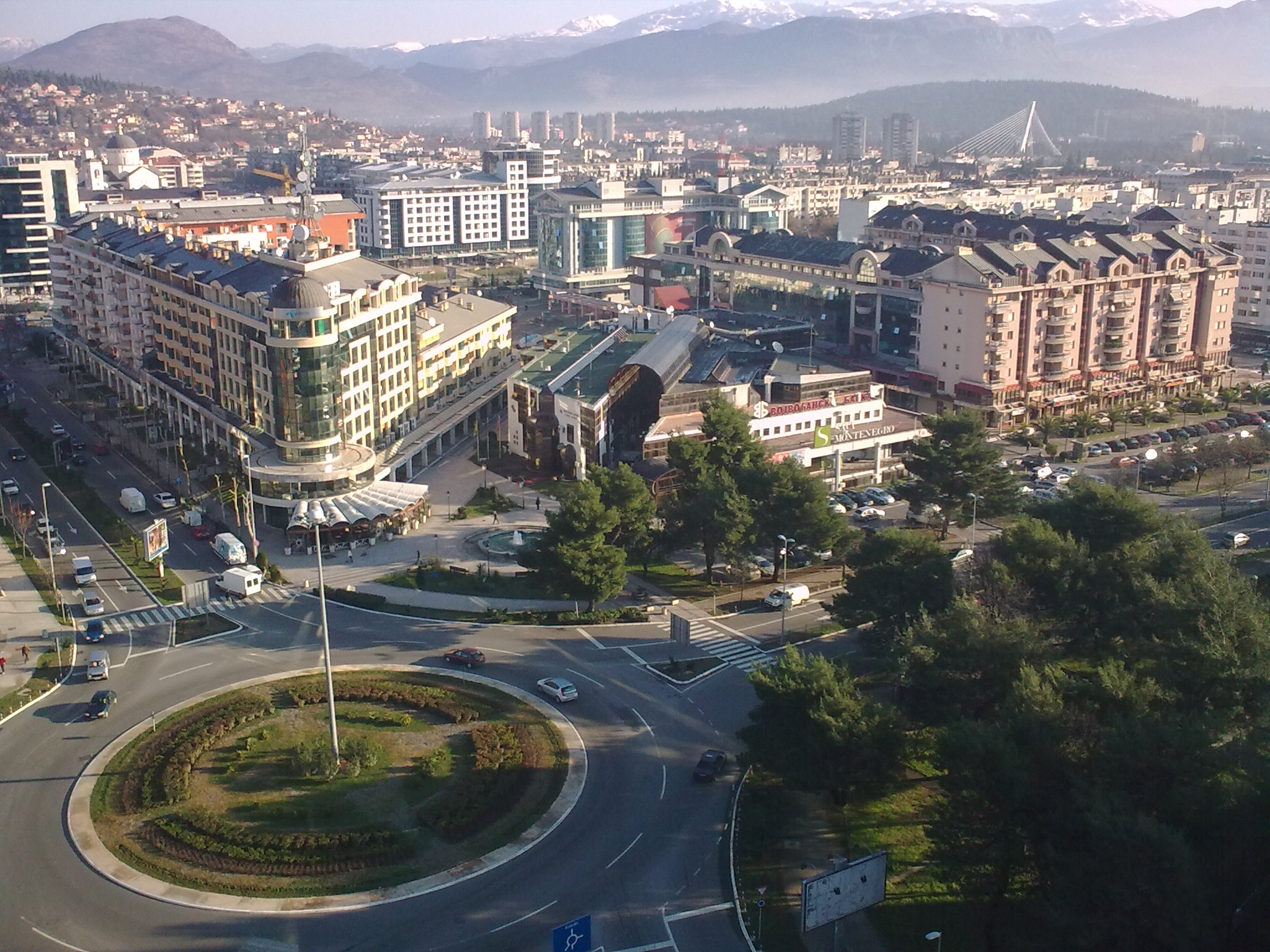
Podgorica

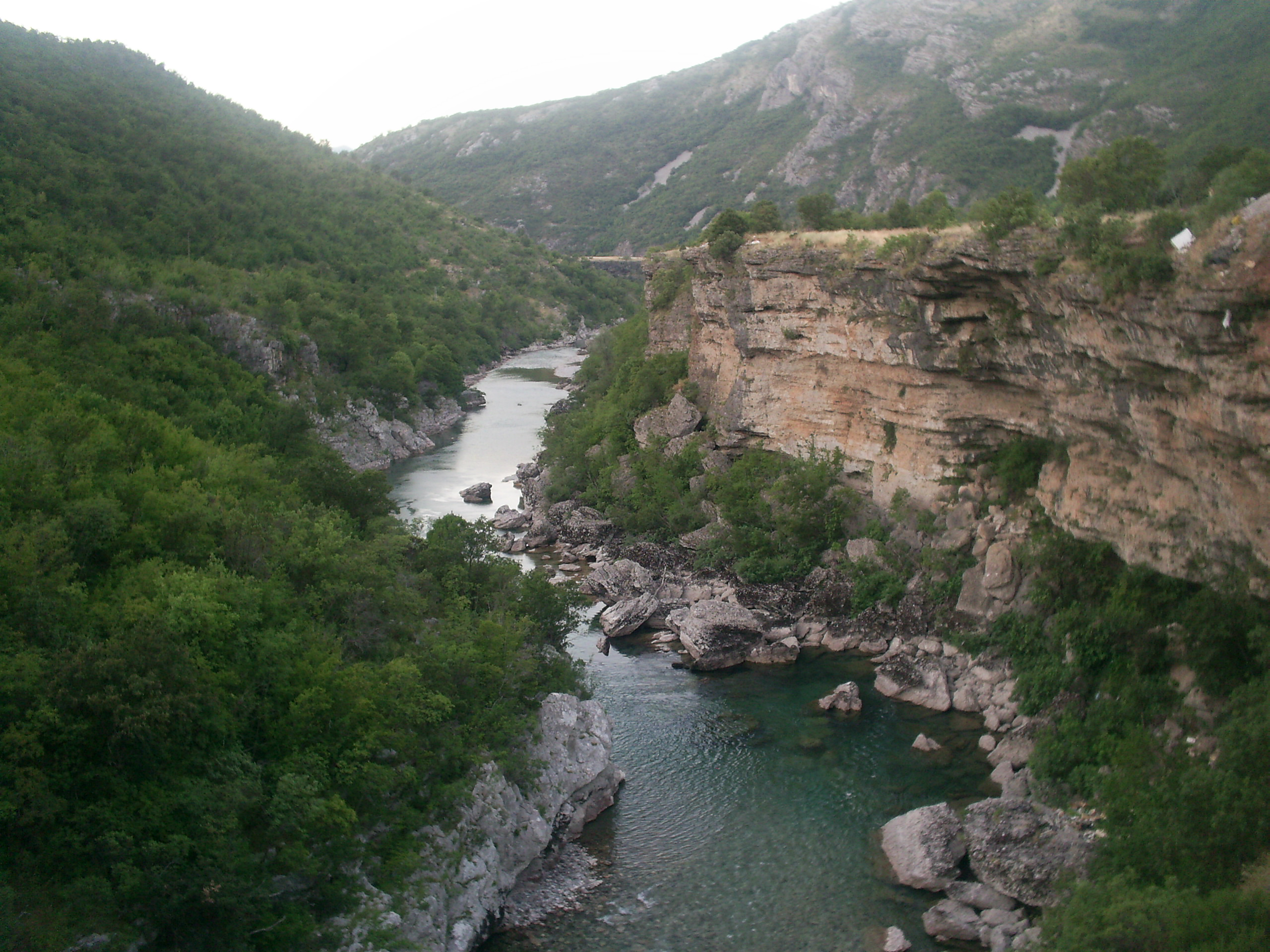
Morača river

Cathedral of Podgorica

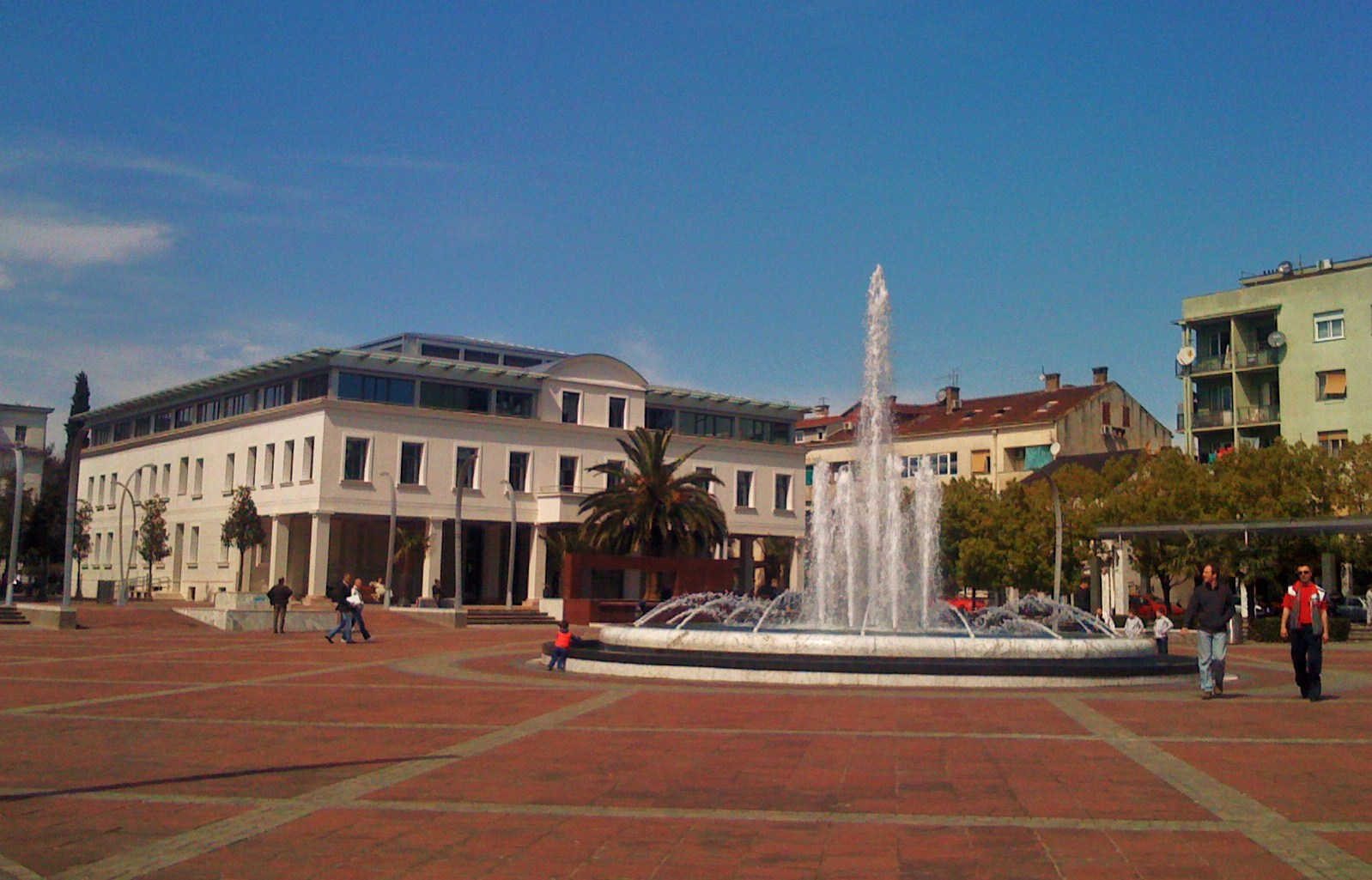
Independence Square

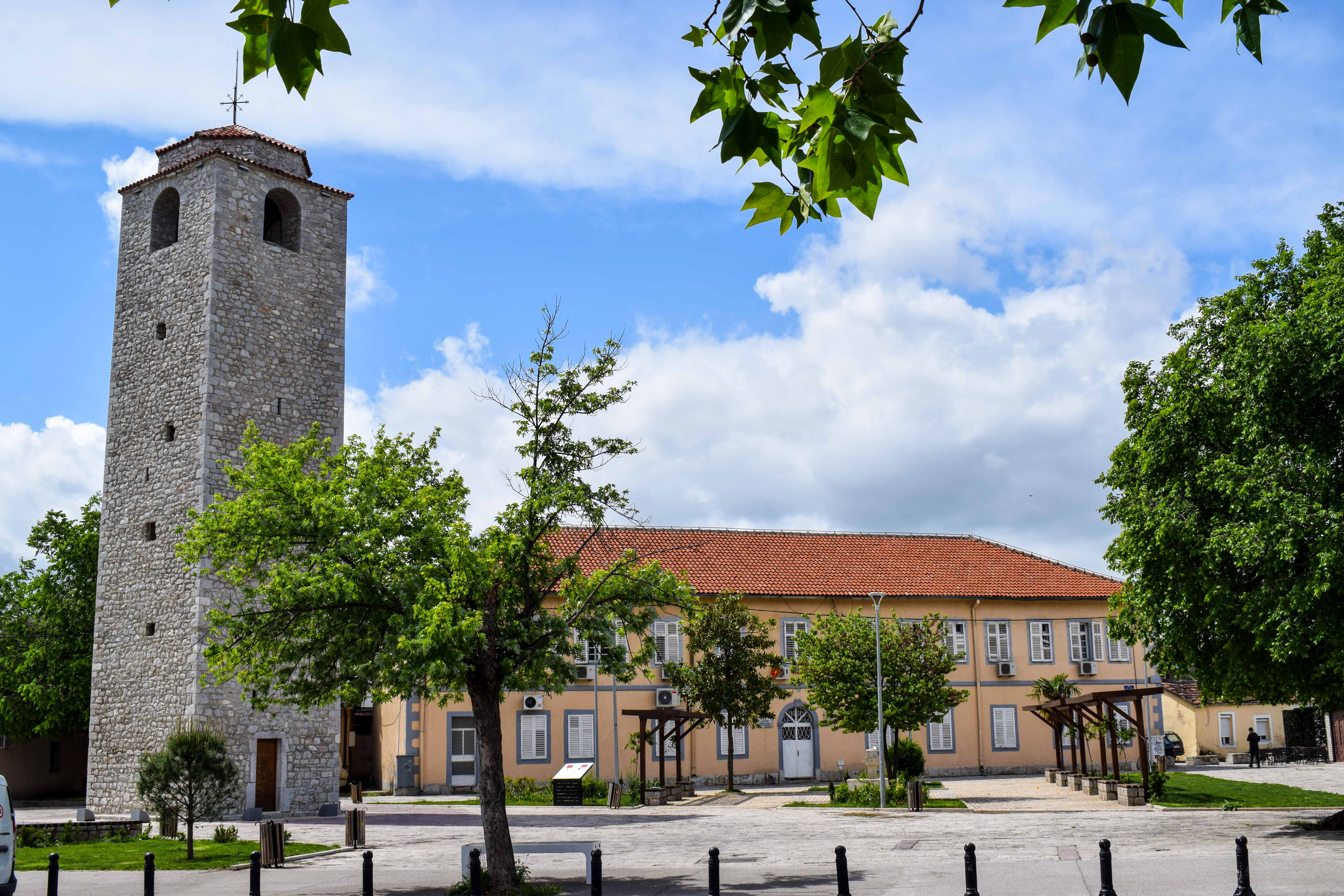
Old Town of Podgorica
