= Albanians in Montenegro =

Ethnic group in Montenegro

Albanians in Montenegro Shqiptarët në Malin e Zi Albanci u Crnoj Gori Албанци у Црној Гори
Total population
- 30,978 (2023 census)

Regions with significant populations
- Ulcinj Municipality (73.53%); Tuzi Municipality (62.55%); Gusinje Municipality (34.38%); Plav Municipality (9.43%); Rožaje Municipality (5.07%); Bar Municipality (4.19%); Podgorica Municipality (0.99%)

Languages
- Albanian (Gheg), Montenegrin

Religion
- Sunni Islam majority (73.75%); Roman Catholic minority (26.25%)

Related ethnic groups
- Albanians, Arbëreshë, Arbanasi, Arvanites, Souliotes

Albanians in Montenegro (Albanian: Shqiptarët e Malit të Zi; Montenegrin: Албанци у Црној Гори, romanized: Albanci u Crnoj Gori) are ethnic Albanians who constitute 4.97% of Montenegro's total population. They are the largest non-Slavic ethnic group in Montenegro.

Albanians are particularly concentrated in southeastern and eastern Montenegro alongside the border with Albania in the following municipalities including Ulcinj (73.5% of total population), Tuzi (62.6%), Gusinje (34.4%), Plav (9.4%), Rožaje (5.1%) Bar (4.19%) and Podgorica (0.99%).

The largest Montenegrin town with significant Albanian population is Ulcinj, where the Albanian National Council is located. In 2022, Dritan Abazović became the first ethnic Albanian to hold the office of Prime Minister of Montenegro.

== Geography ==
Albanians in Montenegro are concentrated along the Albania-Montenegro border in areas that were incorporated in Montenegro after the Congress of Berlin (1878) and the Balkan Wars (1912-13). Coastally, they live in the Ulcinj (Ulqin) and Bar (Tivar) municipalities which formed part of Venetian Albania. Within the Municipality of Bar, Albanians are also found in the regions of Krajë, Mërkot and Shestan. Albanian tribes and regions are located in the transboundary mountainous region of Malësia in Tuzi Municipality, south of Montenegrin capital Podgorica, as well as historically populating much of the Brda region, including as the Zeta and Bjelopavlići plain. Albanian communities in the past were also found in Old Herzegovina, Old Montenegro and the Littoral. In eastern and northeastern Montenegro, Albanians are concentrated in municipalities of Plav (Plavë) and Gusinje (Gucia) and a smaller community is located in Rožaje Municipality (Rozhajë). The Slavic dialect of Gusinje and Plav shows very high structural influence from Albanian. Its uniqueness in terms of language contact between Albanian and Slavic is explained by the fact that most Slavic-speakers in today's Plav and Gusinje are of Albanian origin.

In the past Albanians were present in significant numbers in Bar, Podgorica, Spuž, Nikšić, Kolašin as well as in Žabljak. These communities were largely expelled in different waves during the late 19th century.

A mixture of Slavic and Albanian speakers made up the Muslim population of Sandžak (today divided between Serbia and Montenegro) at the end of the nineteenth century. Many Albanian speakers gradually migrated or were relocated to Kosovo and Macedonia, leaving a primarily Slavic-speaking population in the rest of the region (except in a southeastern corner of Sandžak that ended up as a part of Kosovo).

=== Toponymy ===
A number of placenames in Montenegro are considered to be ultimately derived from or through Albanian. Some cases include:

- Budva, being ultimately derived from the Albanian word butë.
- Ulcinj is considered to be connected with the Albanian word ujk or ulk (meaning wolf in English) from Proto-Albanian *(w)ulka.
- Nikšić appears to have developed from the diminutive Albanian name Niksh plus the Slavic suffix ić.
- Kolašin which according to author Rebecca West was originally named Kol I Shen, being Albanian for 'St. Nicholas'.
- Ceklin has been connected to Albanian ceklinë or cektinë which means shallow ground.
- Crmnica first appears in the 13th century under two different names, Crmnica and Kučevo, which is the slavicized variant of an Albanian toponym that meant "red place" (kuq).
- Lješanska nahija, whose toponym derives from a Slavicized variant of the Albanian masculine name Lesh (Lješ).
- Bojana, a river in southeastern Montenegro, emerged via the Albanian Bunë, and is often seen as indication that Albanian was spoken in the pre-Slavic era in southern Montenegro.

A number of microtoponyms and names of clans in Old Montenegro are originally derived from Albanian onomastics, such as Gjin, Gjon, Progon, Lesh, Mal and others, with some of them being: Đinov Do village in Cuce, Đinovo Brdo in Cetinje, Đinova Glavica in Pješivci, the village of Đinovići in Kosijeri, the Đonovići brotherhood in Brčeli of Crmnica, Lješanska nahija, along with its villages Liješnje, Štitari, Goljemadi and Progonovići, the village of Lješev Stup and the toponym Malošin do in Bjelice, the village of Arbanas in Ceklin.

== History ==
Labeatan lands around Lacus Labeatis in modern-day Montengro.

=== Antiquity ===
The name of the Labeatae tribe, first attested in the 2nd century BCE, is formed by the Lab- particle which is frequently found in the southern Illyrian onomastic area and the common Illyrian suffix -at(ae). The Lab- particle represents a metathesis from Alb- > Lab-, which itself could be related to the appearance of the ethnonym of the Albanians in the same area.

=== Medieval era ===
A document believed to be from 1202, mentions a ruler named Vladislav who gave the Vranjina Monastery land and other concessions, among which was forbidding Albanians from using these lands for grazing or settling. A 1220 document issued by the nun Jelena, bestows the Vranjina monastery certain gifts, and forbids the usage of church land by nobility, be they Serbs, Latins, Albanians or Vlachs. Various Albanian pastoral migrant communities (katun), which included groups like the Mataruge, Mugoša, Macure, Maine, Malonsići, Kriči and possibly the Lužani, starting around the 12th and 13th centuries immigrated across the Zeta, settling in Montenegro and as far as the Neretva river. Albanian katuns are documented in the Tara region in 1278. In the area of modern Ceklin the settlement of Arbanas is mentioned in 1296 in a letter by King Milutin. In the same year a document issued by Stefan Milutin gives the Kuči village of Orahovo and 100 sheep to the Vranjina Monastery. In it Milutin also orders the locals, be they Slavs, Latins, Albanians or Vlachs to pay a tribute to it of 100 perpers.

In the Middle Ages, Albanians in present-day Montenegro lived in the highlands of Malësia-Brda (both terms mean highlands), around Lake Scodra and coastally in the area known as Albania Veneta. Tuzi, a key Albanian settlement today, is mentioned in 1330 in the Dečani chrysobulls as part of the Albanian (arbanas) katun (semi-nomadic pastoral community) of Llesh Tuzi (Ljesa Tuzi in the original), in an area stretching southwards from modern Tuzi Municipality along the Lake Skadar to a village near modern Koplik. This katund included many communities that later formed their own separate communities: Reçi and his sons, Matagushi, Bushati and his sons, Pjetër Suma and Pjetër Kuçi, first known ancestor of Kuči. In the 1330 chrysobulls, the Hoti tribe is mentioned for first time in Hotina Gora (mountains of Hoti) in the Plav and Gusinje regions on the Lim river basin. Among the people of Lužani, Albanian anthroponyms such as Gjon, Lesh, Progon and Muriq are mentioned in the 1330 Dečani chrysobulls.

A certain Nicholas Zakarija is first mentioned in 1385 as a Balšić family commander and governor of Budva in 1363. This is considered the first attestation of a member of the noble Albanian Zaharia family. After more than twenty years of loyalty, Nicholas Zakarija revolted in 1386 and became ruler of Budva. However, by 1389 Đurađ II Balšić had recaptured the city.

Beginning in the 15th century, a period of Albanian piracy occurred lasting until the 19th century. These pirates were based mainly in Ulcinj, but were also found in Bar. During this period, Albanian pirates plundered and raided ships, including both Venetian and Ottoman vessels, disrupting the Mediterranean economy and forcing the Ottoman and European powers to intervene. Some of the pirate leaders from Ulcinj, such as Lika Ceni and Hadji Alia, were well known during this period. The Porte had such a problem with the Albanian pirates that they were given the "name-i hümayun" ("imperial letters"), bilateral agreements to settle armed conflicts. The pirates of Ulcinj, known in Italian as lupi di mare Dulcignotti (Alb. ujqit detarë Ulqinakë, 'Ulcinian sea wolves'), were considered the most dangerous pirates in the Adriatic.

In the Middle Ages, the areas of Crmnica (Kuqeva) and Mrkojevići (Mërkoti) shows a strong symbiosis of Slavic and Albanian populations. In the second half of 15th century, the Slavic anthroponymy of Crmnica and Mrkojević was frequently followed by the Albanian suffix -za. This phenomenon doesn't appear in such widespread form in any other area of Montenegro. It has been interpreted as the result of gradual, centuries-long adoption of Slavic culture by an Albanian-speaking population. The Mrkojevići in particular may present a case of an Albanian-speaking population shifting to a Slavic-speaking one. In 1496 Đurađ Crnojević mentions the nobleman Radovan Lъšević (Lješević) in the area of Lješanska nahija, while its inhabitants as Lьšnane (Lešnane).

=== Ottoman period ===
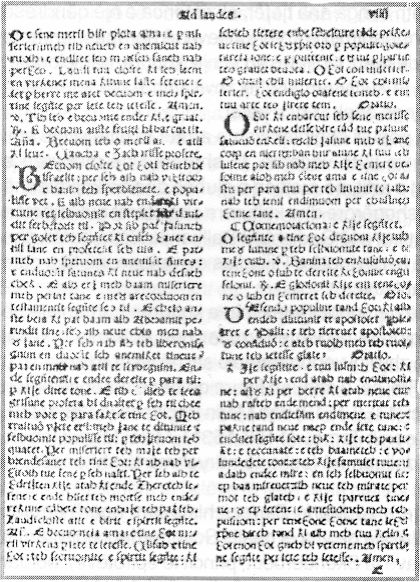
A page from the Meshari.

Meshari (Albanian for "Missal") the oldest published book in Albanian was written by Gjon Buzuku, a Catholic Albanian cleric in 1555. Gjon Buzuku was born in the village of Livari in Krajina (Krajë in Albanian) in the Bar region.

In 1565 the Kelmendi rose up against the Ottomans and appear to have done so together with the Kuči and Piperi. In 1597, the tribes of the Kelmendi, Kuči, Piperi and Bjelopavlići and the Nikšiči rose in rebellion, headed under the latters leader, voivoda Grdan.

In 1613, the Ottomans launched a campaign against the rebel tribes of Montenegro. In response, the tribes of the Vasojevići, Kuči, Bjelopavlići, Piperi, Kastrati, Kelmendi, Shkreli andi Hoti formed a political and military union known as “The Union of the Mountains” or “The Albanian Mountains” . The leaders swore an oath of besa to resist with all their might any upcoming Ottoman expeditions, thereby protecting their self-government and disallowing the establishment of the authority of the Ottoman Spahis in the northern highlands. Their uprising had a liberating character. With the aim of getting rid of the Ottomans from the Albanian territories

In the 1614 Convention of Kuçi, 44 leaders mostly from northern Albania and Montenegro took part to organize an insurrection against the Ottomans and ask for assistance by the Papacy. That same year, the Kelmendi along with the tribes of Kuči, Piperi and Bjelopavlići, sent a letter to the kings of Spain and France claiming they were independent from Ottoman rule and did not pay tribute to the empire.

In 1658, the seven tribes of Kuči, Vasojevići, Bratonožići, Piperi, Klimenti, Hoti and Gruda allied themselves with the Republic of Venice, establishing the so-called "Seven-fold banner" or "alaj-barjak", against the Ottomans.

A Franciscan report of the 17th century illustrates the final stages of the acculturation of some Albanian tribes in Brda. Its author writes that the Bratonožići (Bratonishi), Piperi (Pipri), Bjelopavlići (Palabardhi) and Kuči (Kuçi):" nulla di meno essegno quasi tutti del rito serviano, e di lingua Illrica ponno piu presto dirsi Schiavoni, ch' Albanesi " (since almost all of them use the Serbian rite and the Illyric (Slavic) language, soon they should be called Slavs, rather than Albanians)

In 1685 the Mainjani tribe participated in the Battle of Vrtijeljka on the side of the Venetians. The battle resulted in defeat. The news of the battle was recorded in Rome on 27 May 1685: "two courageous leaders, one named Bajo, friend of captain Janko, and the other, captain Vuković the Arbanas, died"; the source states that the defeat was due to betrayal of Montenegrins in the battle.

In 1688 the tribes of Kuçi, Kelmendi and Pipri rose up and captured the town of Medun, defeating 2 Ottoman counter-assaults and capturing many supplies in the process before retreating.

In 1700, after the Great Serb Migration, the Kelmendi and Kuçi and other tribes like the Shkreli of Rugova established themselves in the region of Rožaje and the neighboring town of Tutin in Serbia. The Shala, Krasniqi, and Gashi also moved in the region.

The Arbanasi people in the Zadar region are thought to have hailed from the Catholic Albanian inhabitants of the region of Shestan, specifically from the villages of Briska (Brisk), Šestan (Shestan), Livari (Ljare), and Podi (Pod) having settled the Zadar area in 1726–27 and 1733 on the decision of Archbishop Vicko Zmajević of Zadar, in order to repopulate the land.

=== Semi-independent Albanian Pashalik ===
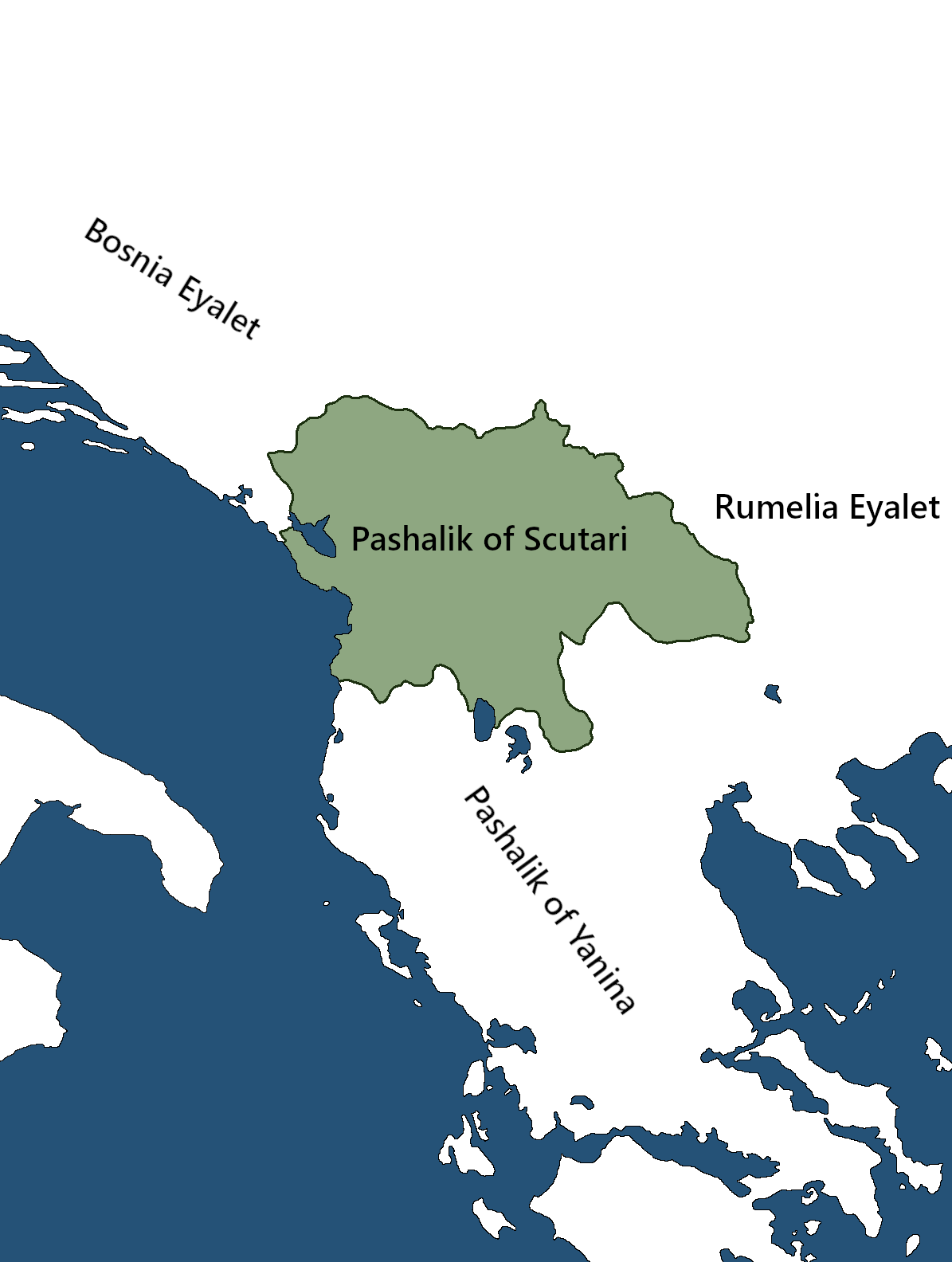
At its peak during the reign of Kara Mahmud Bushati The Shkodra pashalik controlled most of Montenegro.

A period of Albanian semi-independence started in the 1750s with the Independent Albanian Pashas. In 1754 the autonomous Albanian Pashalik of Bushati family would be established with center the city of Shkodra called Pashalik of Shkodra. The Bushati family initially dominated the Shkodër region through a network of alliances with various highland tribes. Kara Mahmud Bushati attempted to establish a de juro independent principality and expand the lands under his control by playing off Austria and Russia against the Sublime Porte. In 1785, Kara Mahmud's forces attacked Montenegrin territory, and Austria offered to recognize him as the ruler of all Albania if he would ally himself with Vienna against the Sublime Porte. Seizing an opportunity, Kara Mahmud sent the sultan the heads of an Austrian delegation in 1788, and the Ottomans appointed him governor of Shkodër. When he attempted to wrest land from Montenegro in 1796, however, he was defeated and killed by an ambush in northern Montenegro. At its peak during the reign of Kara Mahmud Bushati the pashalik encompassed much of Albania, most of Kosovo, western Macedonia, southeastern Serbia and most of Montenegro. The pashalik was dissolved in 1831.

British author Rebecca West visited the town of Kolašin in the 1930s where she learned that in the 18th century, Catholic Albanians and Orthodox Montenegrins lived in peace. In 1858, however, several Montenegrin tribes attacked the town and killed all inhabitants who kept their Albanian identity or who were Muslim.

=== National Awakening ===
On October 26, 1851, the Arnaut chieftain Gjonlek from Nikšić was traveling with 200 Arnauts, given the task of defending Ottoman Albanian interests. They were attacked by Montenegrin forces from Gacko. On November 11, 1851, Montenegrin forces numbering 30 crossed the Morača river and attacked the Albanian Ottoman citadel, under Selim Aga, with 27 men. Five were killed and four wounded while Selim Aga pulled back, wounded, into his house. The next morning, he returned to counter the Montenegrins. The Pasha of Scutari immediately began gathering troops.

=== League of Prizren ===
In 1877, Nikšić was annexed by the Montenegrins in accordance with the Treaty of Berlin. American author William James Stillman (1828–1901) who traveled in the region at the time writes in his biography of the Montenegrin forces who, on the orders of the Prince, began to bomb the Studenica fortress in Nikšić with artillery. Around 20 Albanian nizams were inside the fortress who resisted and when the walls breached, they surrendered and asked Stillman if they were going to be decapitated. An Albanian accompanying Stillman translated his words saying they were not going to be killed in which the Albanians celebrated. Shortly after the treaty, the Montenegrin prince began expelling the Albanians from Nikšić, Žabljak and Kolašin who then fled to Turkey, Kosovo (Pristina) and Macedonia. The Montenegrin forces also robbed the Albanians before the expulsion. After the fall of Nikšić, Prince Nicholas I wrote a poem of the victory. After the territorial expansion of Montenegro towards the Ottoman territories in 1878, Albanians for the first time became citizens of that country. Albanians that obtained Montenegrin citizenship were Muslims and Catholics, and lived in the cities of Bar and Ulcinj, including their surroundings, in the bank of river Bojana and shore of Lake Skadar, as well as in Zatrijebač.

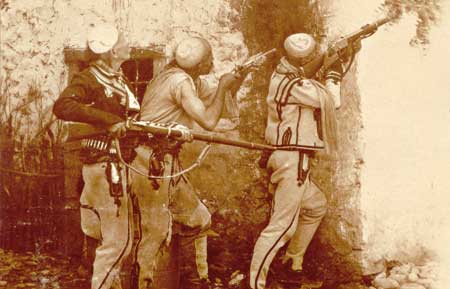
Malësors fighting in the Battle of Ržanica

On the eve of conflict between Montenegro and the Ottomans (1876–1878), a substantial Albanian population resided in the Sanjak of İşkodra. In the Montenegrin-Ottoman war that ensued, strong resistance in the towns of Podgorica (majority Muslim at the time, with a substantial portion being Albanian) and Spuž toward Montenegrin forces was followed by the expulsion of their Albanian and Slavic Muslim populations who resettled in Shkodër. These populations resettled in Shkodër city and its environs. A smaller Albanian population formed of the wealthy elite voluntarily left and resettled in Shkodër after Ulcinj's incorporation into Montenegro in 1880.

On January 31, 1879, Montenegrin teacher Šćepan Martinović informed the government of Cetinje that the Muslims of Nikšić desired a school. The Ottomans had opened schools in Nikšić, among other neighboring regions, in the 17th and 18th century.

In 1879, Zenel Ahmet Demushi of the Geghyseni tribe, fought with 40 members of the family against Montenegrin forces led by Marko Miljanov in Nikšić . The conflict intensified in 1880 when the Albanian irregulars fought under Ali Pash Gucia against the Montenegrin forces led by the brother of Marko Miljanov, Teodor Miljanov, the battle lasting five hours, according to letters written by two local Albanians from Shkodër who participated in the battle.

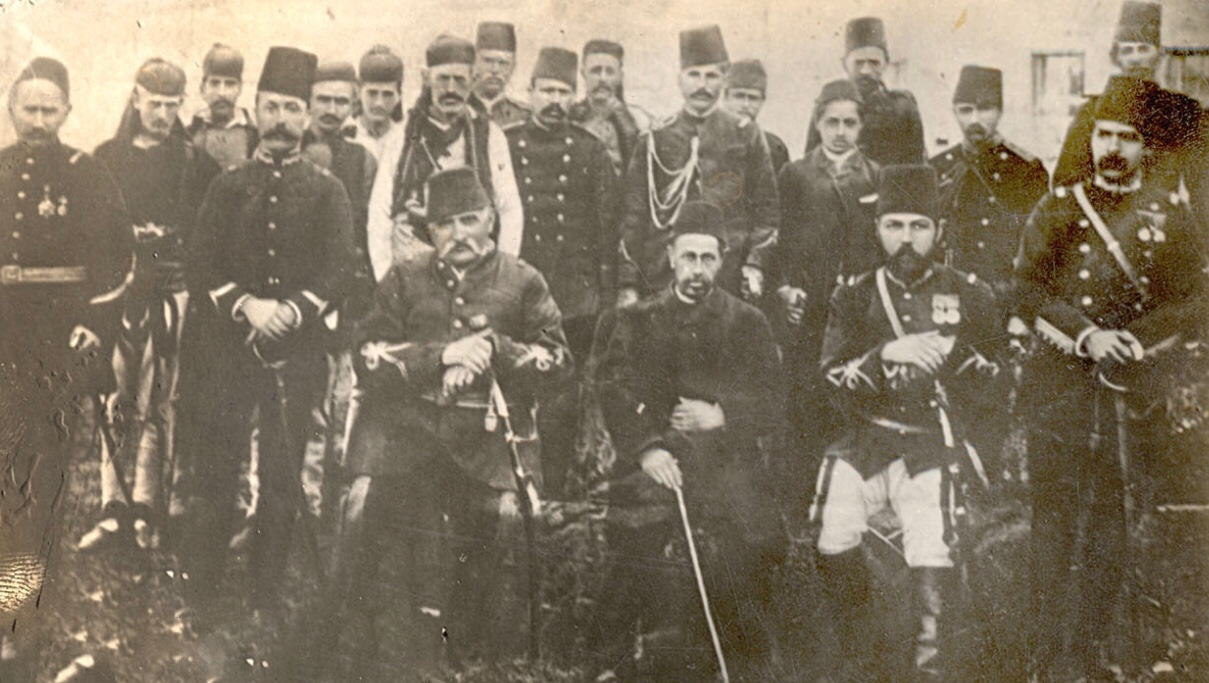
Ali Pasha of Gucia with other members of the League of Prizren

The Battles for Plav and Gusinje were armed conflicts between the Principality of Montenegro and Ottoman irregular armies (pro-Ottoman Albanian League of Prizren) that broke out following the decision of the Congress of Berlin (1878) that the territories of Plav and Gusinje (part of former Scutari Vilayet) be ceded to Montenegro. The conflicts took place in this territory between 9 October 1879 and 8 January 1880. The following battles were fought: the Velika attacks (9 October–22 November 1879), the Battle of Novšiće (4 December 1879) and the Battle of Murino (8 January 1880). Some of the participants in the battles became distinguished such as Jakup Ferri of Plav, whose actions in 1879 made him a hero of Albanian folk poetry together with Ali Pasha Gucia.

In 1880 a battle was fought between the Ottoman forces of Dervish Pasha and Albanian irregulars at the region of Kodra e Kuqe, close to Ulcinj. The area of Ulcinj had been handed over to Montenegro by the Ottomans after the Albanians previously fought against the annexions of Hoti and Grude. The Great powers instead pressured the Ottomans to hand over the area of Ulcinj, but also here the Albanians refused. Eventually the Great powers forced the Ottomans to take actions against the League of Prizren, ending the resistance and successfully handing over the town of Ulcinj to Montenegro.

In 1899, the government in Montenegro arrested Albanians in Nikšić and Danilovgrad out of fear that the Malesori would attack the Young Turks in the region, and the captives were held for more than six months in prison.

=== 20th century ===
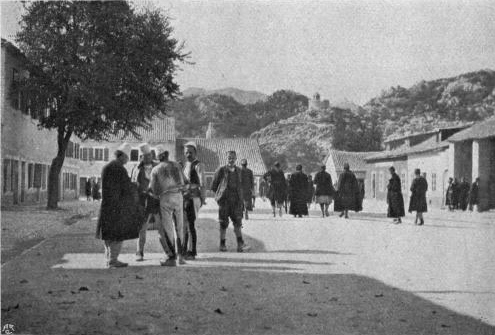
Albanians in Cetinje, Principality of Montenegro, 1906

The Bulgarian foreign ministry compiled a report about the five kazas (districts) of the sanjak of the Novi Pazar in 1901–02. According to the Bulgarian report, the kazas of Akova and Kolašin were almost entirely populated by Albanians. In the kaza of Akovo there were 47 Albanian villages which had 1,266 households, whereas Serbs lived in 11 villages which had 216 households. The town of Akova (Bijelo Polje) had 100 Albanian and Serb households. The kaza of Kolašin had 27 Albanian villages with 732 households and 5 Serb villages with 75 households. The administrative centre of the kaza, Šahovići, had 25 Albanian households.

Flamuri i Liris, the flag raised in Deçiq by Ded Gjo Luli on 6 April 1911.

On March 24, 1911, an Albanian uprising broke out in Malësia. During one of its battles, the Battle of Deçiq (6 April), the Albanian flag was raised for the first time in possibly over 400 years in the Deçiq mountain near Tuzi. It was raised by Ded Gjo Luli on the peak of Bratila after victory was secured. The phrase "Tash o vllazën do t’ju takojë të shihni atë që për 450 vjet se ka pa kush" (Now brothers you have earned the right to see that which has been unseen for 450 years) has been attributed to Ded Gjo Luli by later memoirs of those who were present when he raised the flag. It was one of three banners brought to Malësia by Palokë Traboini, student in Austria. The other two banners were used by Ujka of Gruda and Prelë Luca of Triepshi.

On 11 May, Shefqet Turgut Pasha issued a general proclamation which declared martial law and offered an amnesty for all rebels (except for Malësor chieftains) if they immediately return to their homes. After Ottoman troops entered the area Tocci fled the empire abandoning his activities. Three days later, he ordered his troops to again seize Dečić. Sixty Albanian chieftains rejected Turgut Pasha's proclamation on their meeting in Podgorica on 18 May. After almost a month of intense fightings rebels were trapped and their only choices were either to die fighting, to surrender or to flee to Montenegro. Most of the rebels chose to flee to Montenegro which became a base for large number of rebels determined to attack the Ottoman Empire. Ismail Kemal Bey and Tiranli Cemal bey traveled from Italy to Montenegro at the end of May and met the rebels to convince them to adopt the nationalistic agenda which they eventually did.

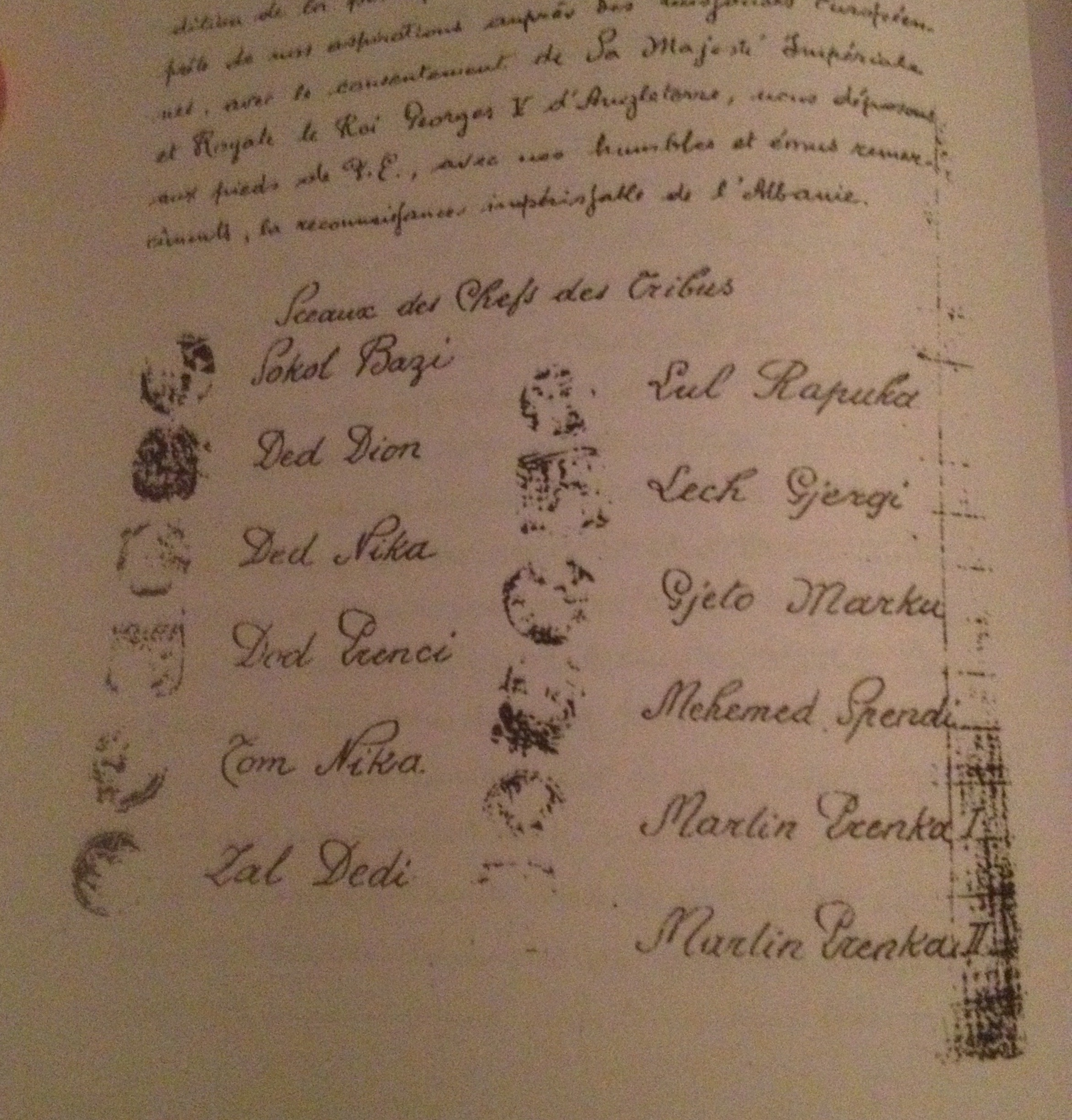
Copy of the Grece Memorandum (1911)

After the battle, at the initiative Ismail Qemali the assembly of the tribal leaders of the revolt was held in a village in Montenegro (Gerče) on 23 June 1911 to adopt the "Gërçe Memorandum") with their requests both to Ottoman Empire and Europe (in particular to the Great Britain). This memorandum was signed by 22 Albanian chieftains, four from each tribe of Hoti, Grude and Shkrel, five from Kastrati, three from Klementi and two from Shale.

The Plav–Gusinje massacres occurred between late 1912 and March 1913 in the areas of the modern Plav and Gusinje municipalities and adjacent areas. More than 1,800 locals, mostly Muslim Albanians from these two regions were killed and 12,000 were forced to convert to Orthodoxy by the military administration put in charge of these regions by the Kingdom of Montenegro which had annexed them during the First Balkan War.

After the Balkan Wars, new territories inhabited by Albanians became part of Montenegro. Montenegro then gained a part of Malesija, respectively Hoti and Gruda, with Tuzi as center, Plav, Gusinje, Rugovo, Peja and Gjakova. During World War I, Albanian immigrants from Nikšić who had been expelled to Cetinje sent a letter to Isa Boletini saying that they risked starving if he did not send them money for food.

On May 26, 1913, a delegation from the chief families of Hoti, Gruda, Kelmendi, Shkreli and Kastrati met Admiral Cecil Burney of the international fleet and petitioned against the annexation of Hoti and Gruda by Montenegro. The delegation warned that hostilities would resume if those areas didn't remain "entirely Albanian".

During World War I, local Albanian qadi Bajram Balota organised a force of irregulars in the territory held by Austria-Hungary in Montenegro around Berane and Rožaje, with his soldiers and allies persecuting and killing Orthodox Montenegrins. His movement was dissolved following a defeat by Austro-Hungarian soldiers on June 18, 1918.r

The entry of the Montenegrin army in 1912-13 and the Yugoslav army after 1919 in Plav-Gusinje was accompanied by repressive policies against the local population. An Albanian revolt, which later came to be known as the Plav rebellion rose up in the Rožaje, Plav and Gusinje districts, fighting against the inclusion of Sandžak in the Kingdom of Serbs, Croats and Slovenes. As a result, during the Serbian army's second occupation of Rožaje, which took place in 1918–1919, seven hundred Albanian citizens were slaughtered in Rožaje. In 1919, Serb forces attacked Albanian populations in Plav and Gusinje, which had appealed to the British government for protection. About 450 local civilians were killed after the uprising was quelled. These events resulted in a large influx of Albanians migrating to Albania.

With the creation of the Kingdom of Serbs, Croats and Slovenes after World War I, Albanians in Montenegro became discriminated. The position would improve somewhat in Tito's Yugoslavia. In the mid-twentieth century, 20,000 Albanians lived in Montenegro and their number would grow by the end of the century. By the end of the 20th century the number of Albanians began to fall as a result of immigration.

During the Second World War, Chetnik forces based in Montenegro conducted a series of ethnic cleansing operations against Muslims in the Bihor region. In May 1943, an estimated 5400 Albanian men, women and children in Bihor were massacred by Chetnik forces under Pavle Đurišić. The notables of the region then published a memorandum and declared themselves to be Albanians. The memorandum was sent to Prime Minister Ekrem Libohova whom they asked to intervene so the region could be united to the Albanian kingdom. That same year saw the creation of the SS-police "self-defence" regiment Sandžak, being formed by joining three battalions of Albanian collaborationist troops with one battalion of the Sandžak Muslim militia. Its leader was Sulejman Pačariz, an Islamic cleric of Albanian origin.

The spring of 1945 saw the massacre of an unknown number of mostly ethnic Albanians from Kosovo Yugoslav Partisans in late March or early April 1945 in Bar, a municipality in Montenegro, at the end of World War II. Yugoslav sources put the number of victims at 400 while Albanian sources put the figure at 2,000 killed in Bar alone. According to Croatian historian Ljubica Štefan, the Partisans killed 1,600 Albanians in Bar on 1 April after an incident at a fountain. There are also accounts claiming that the victims included young boys. After the massacre, the site was immediately covered in concrete by the Yugoslav communist regime and built an airport on top of the mass grave.

=== Modern period ===
On 26 November 2019, an earthquake struck Albania. In Montenegro, Albanians from Ulcinj were involved in a major relief effort sending items such as food, blankets, diapers and baby milk through a local humanitarian organisation Amaneti and in Tuzi through fundraising efforts.

As of 2022, Albanians from Montenegro have been represented by numerous Albanian-American associations, namely the Albanian-American Association of Ulqin; who, through community and humanitarian initiatives, have been able to be beacon for all Albanians with heritage in Montenegro.

== Demographics ==
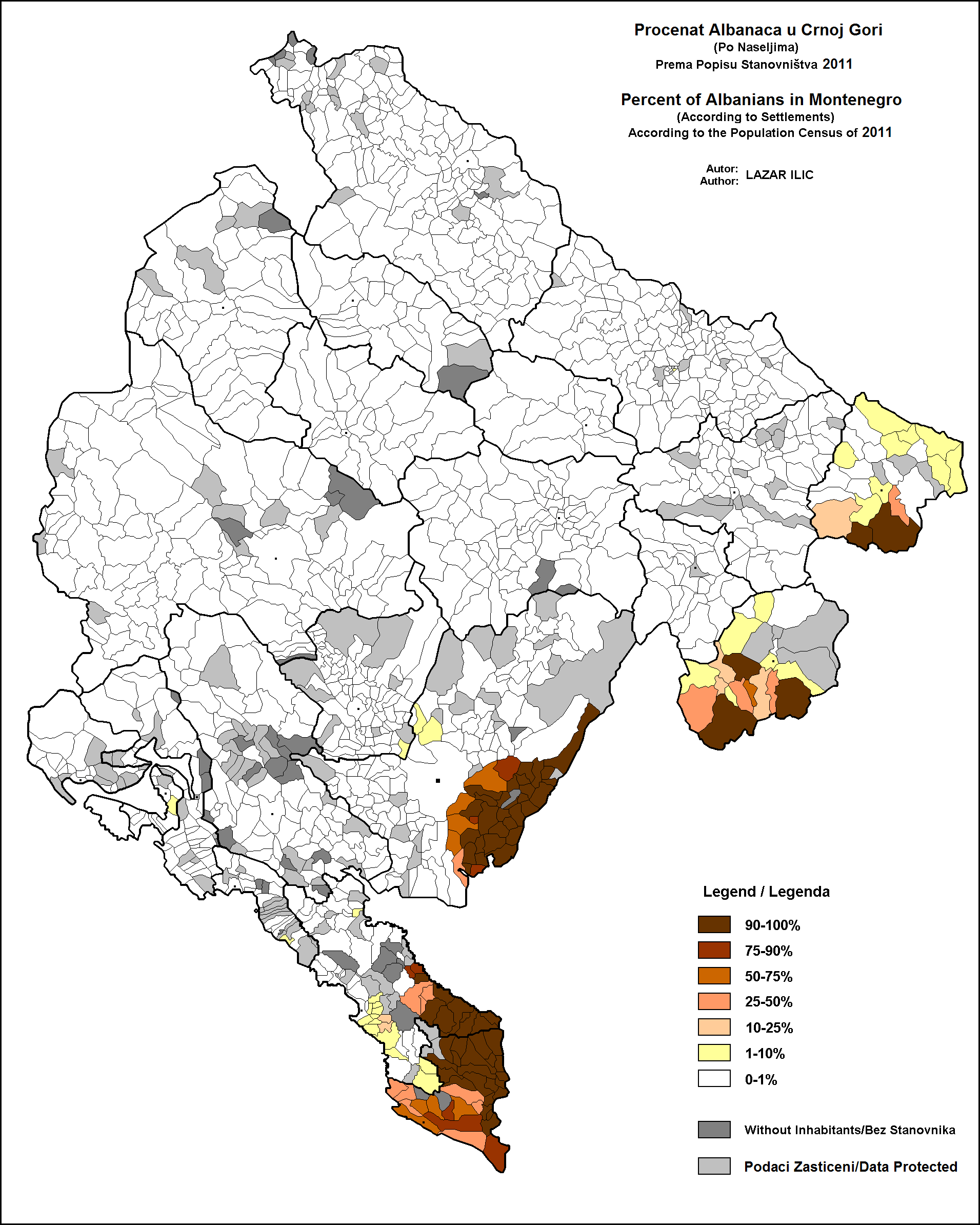
Montenegrin settlements with Albanian population (2011)

Albanians in Montenegro are settled in the southeastern and eastern parts of the country. Ulcinj Municipality, consisting of Ulcinj (Albanian: Ulqin) with the surroundings and Ana e Malit region, along with the newly formed Tuzi Municipality, are the only municipalities where Albanians are the majority (74% and 63% of the populations respectively). A large number of Albanians also live in the following regions: Bar (Tivar) and Skadarska Krajina (Krajë) in Bar Municipality (1,919 Albanians or 4% of the population), Gusinje (Guci) in Gusinje Municipality (1,352 or 34%), Plav (Plavë) in Plav Municipality (853 or 9%) and Rožaje (Rozhajë) in Rožaje Municipality (1,176 or 5%) and Podgorica (1,780 or 0.99%).

The largest Albanian settlement is Ulcinj, followed by Tuzi.

=== Municipalities with an Albanian majority ===
Of the 24 municipalities in the country, two have an ethnic Albanian majority.

Emblem	Municipality	Area km^{2} (sq mi)	Settlements	Population (2023)		Mayor
Emblem	Municipality	Area km^{2} (sq mi)	Settlements	Total	%	Mayor
	Ulcinj; Ulqin	255 km^{2} (98 sq mi)	41	15,078	73.53%	Genci Nimanbegu (FORCA)
	Tuzi; Tuz	236 km^{2} (91 sq mi)	37	8,119	62.55%	Nik Gjeloshaj (AA)
—	2	—	78	23,197	—	—

== Anthropology ==
The Albanians in Montenegro are Ghegs.

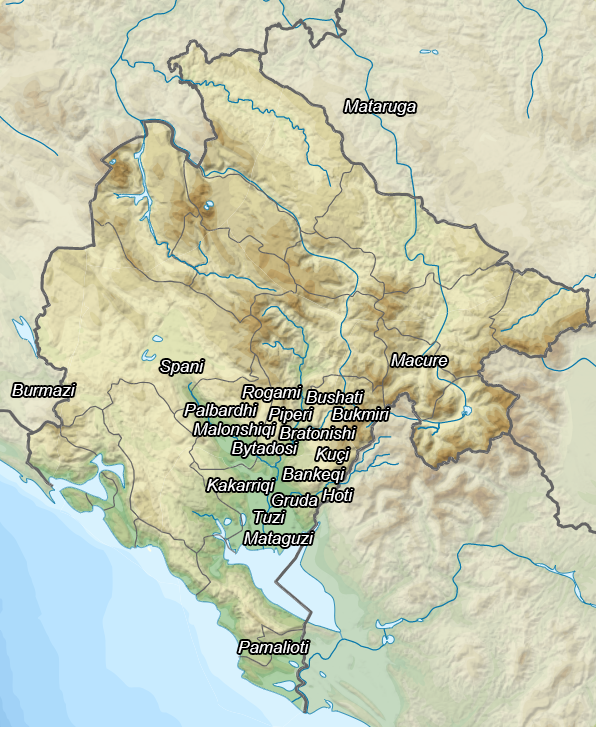
15th-16th century Albanian tribes in the territory of modern-day Montenegro

=== Tribes ===
The historical Albanian tribes which exist in Montenegro up to the modern era are: Hoti, Gruda, and Koja e Kuçit.

Other Albanian tribes also existed in the past, but either formed other tribes or assimilated into the neighbouring Slavic population. Examples include Mataruge and Španje in Old Herzegovina, Kriči in the region of Mojkovac, Kryethi and Pamalioti around the city of Ulcinj, Mahine above Budva, Goljemadi in Old Montenegro, as well as tribes who inhabited the Brda area, including Bytadosi, Bukumiri, Malonšići, Macure, Mataguzi, Drekalovići, Kakarriqi, Mugoša, Rogami, Kuçi, Piperi, Bratonožići, Vasojevići and Bjelopavlići, the latter five now identifying as Slavic. The Ceklin tribal community are of partial Albanian origin, with the two founding brotherhoods sharing descent matrilineally from Piperi while being patrilineally from the Kelmendi (Gornjaci) and Piperi (Donjaci). The Lužani, were inhabitants of the upper Zeta valley, among whom common Albanian anthroponyms were also found. They were at least partly of Albanian origin with Hrabrak suggesting that they might have been recent immigrants from Albania. Certain scholars such as Tea Mayhew and Marie-Janine Calic also consider the Paštrovići to have been an Albanian tribe. The tribe of the Riđani appear to have been predominantly a romanized people, nevertheless Albanian names also appear among them, as was the case with one of their leaders, katunar Šimrak. The name of the Nikšići, appears to have developed from the diminutive Albanian Niksh plus the Slavic suffix ić.

== Culture ==
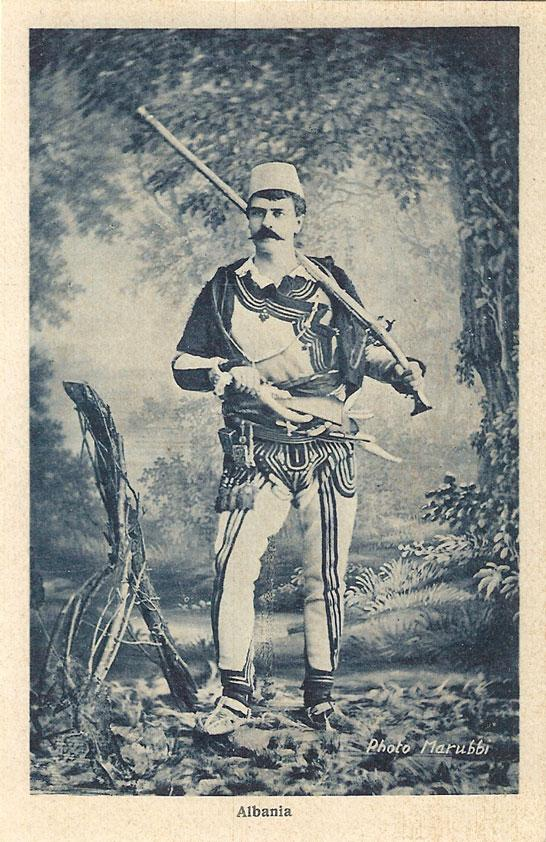
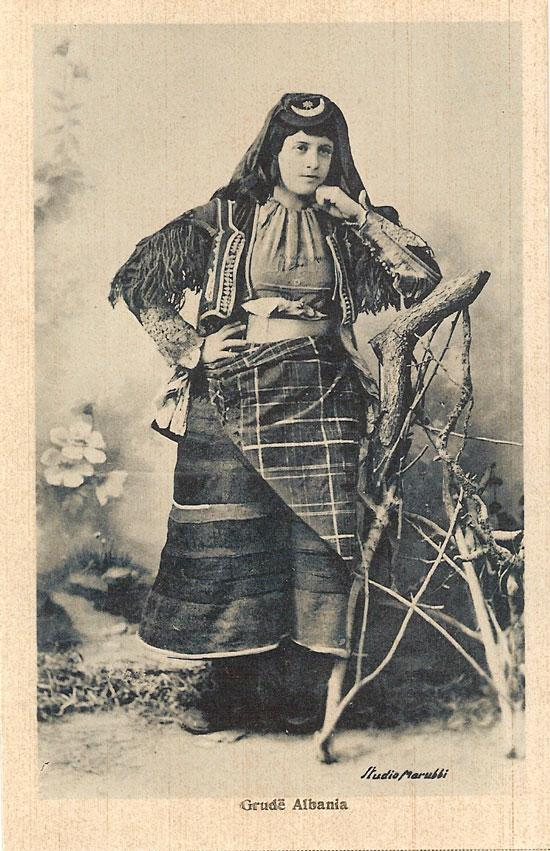
Right: Traditional female clothing from Grudë
Left: Traditional male clothing from Krajë

Montenegrin Albanian culture in this region is closely related to the culture of Albanians in Albania, and the city of Shkodër in particular. Their Albanian language dialect is Gheg as of Albanians in Northern Albania.

=== Religion ===
According to the 2003 census, 73.86% of Albanians living in Montenegro were Muslim and 26.13% were Roman Catholic. The religious life of Muslim Albanians is organized by the Islamic Community of Montenegro, comprising not only Albanians, but also other Muslim minorities in Montenegro. Catholic Albanians, generally living in Šestani, Malesija, and some in the Bar and Ulcinj municipalities, are members of Roman Catholic Archdiocese of Bar, whose members are mainly Albanians, but which also includes a small number of Slavs. The current archbishop, Rrok Gjonlleshaj, is an ethnic Albanian.

During the Middle Ages, Eastern Orthodox Albanians also inhabited Montenegro, with some examples including the Mahine near Budva, which had as its gathering place the Podmaine monastery, and the Mataguži south of Podgorica whose leaders in 1468 donated to the Vranjina Monastery a land area between Rijeka Plavnica and Karabež on the shores of Lake Skadar.

=== Language ===
Albanians in Montenegro speak the Gheg Albanian dialect, namely the northwestern variant, while according to the 2011 Census, there are 32,671 native speakers of the Albanian language (or 5.27% of the population).

According to Article 13 of the Constitution of Montenegro, Albanian language (alongside Serbian, Bosnian and Croatian) is a language in official use, officially recognized as minority language.

=== Music ===
The lahuta is used by Albanians of Montenegro for the singing of epic songs or Albanian Songs of the Frontier Warriors. This practice was especially common in Malësia, although it was also practiced among other regions such as Sandžak with the bard Avdo Međedović. Yahya bey Dukagjini, one of the best-known diwan poets of the 16th century, was an Albanian from Pljevlja.

=== Education ===
The government of Montenegro provides Albanian-language education in the local primary and secondary schools. There is one department in the University of Montenegro, located in Podgorica, offered in Albanian, namely teacher education.

== Politics ==
Early 20th century political figures which had significant activity in the Albanian community in Montenegro are Ismail Nikoçi, mayor of Gusinje and Agan Koja, imam of Plav. Nikoçi fought against the annexation of Plav-Gusinje by Yugoslavia in 1919 raised awareness for the rights of the Albanian refugees which left the area. Koja who became more prominent after Nikoçi's assassination led a group of kachaks who fought against the Yugoslav army in the Albanian-Yugoslav borderlands. Cafo Beg Ulqini was elected as the first Albanian born Mayor of Ulcinj where he held office for two decades prior to his appointment to Regent of the Albanian Kingdom in 1944. The leader of the Kaçak movement in Rozaje, Kolašin and Bihor was Jusuf Mehonja, a member of the Committee of Kosovo, among others such as Husein Boshko, Feriz Sallku and Rek Bisheva.

The first political party created by Albanians in this country is the Democratic League in Montenegro, founded by Mehmet Bardhi in 1990. Most Albanians support the country's integration into the EU: during the 2006 Montenegrin independence referendum, in Ulcinj Municipality, where Albanians at that time accounted over 72% of the population, 88.50% of voters voted for an independent Montenegro. Overall, the vote of the Albanian minority secured the country's secession from Serbia and Montenegro.

In 2008, the Albanian National Council (Albanian: Këshilli Kombëtar i Shqiptarëve, abb. KKSH) was established to represent the political interests of the Albanian community. The current chairman of the KKSH is Faik Nika.

In 2022, Dritan Abazović became the first ethnic Albanian to hold the office of Prime Minister of Montenegro.

== See also ==
- Albania–Montenegro relations
- Serbo-Montenegrins in Albania
- Malësia
- Malesija, Montenegro
- Albanians
- Black Montenegrins

== Gallery ==
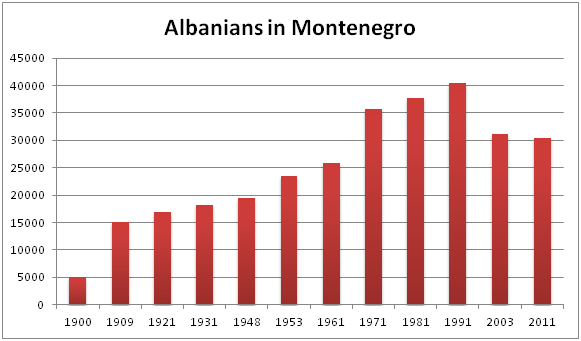
Albanians in Montenegro from 1921 to 2011.

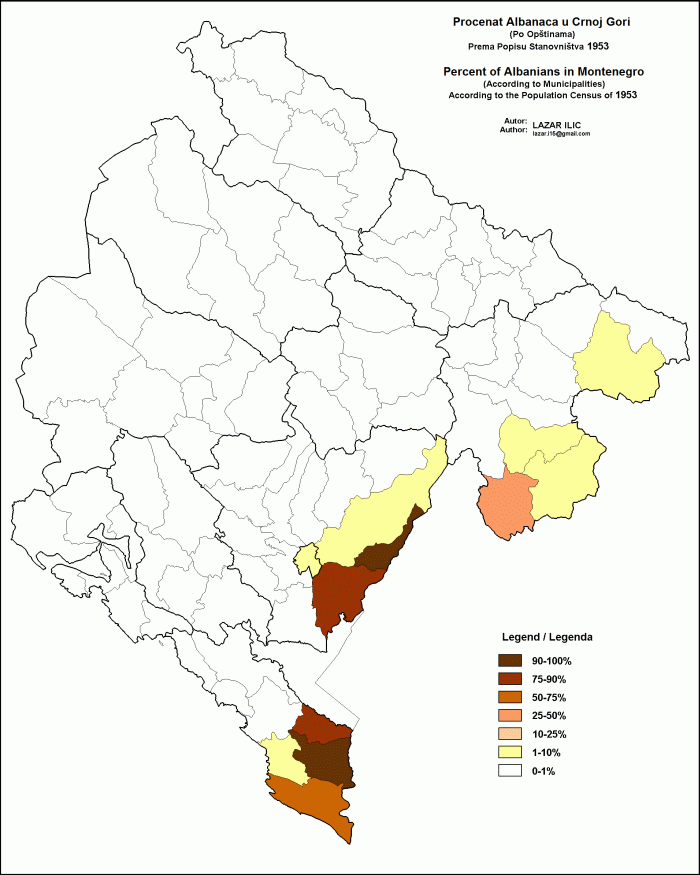
Percent of Albanians by municipalities, 1953.

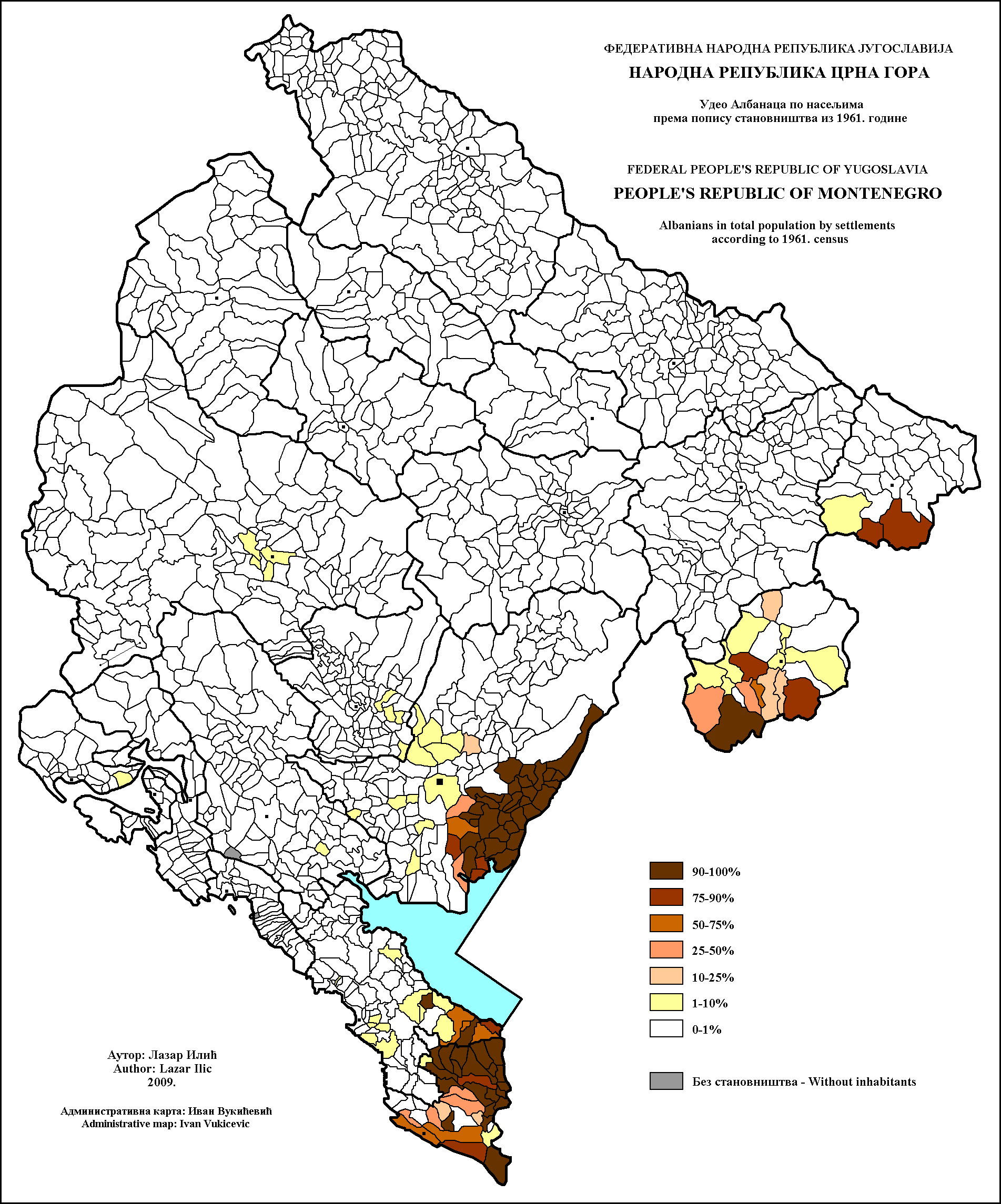
Percent of Albanians by settlements, 1961.

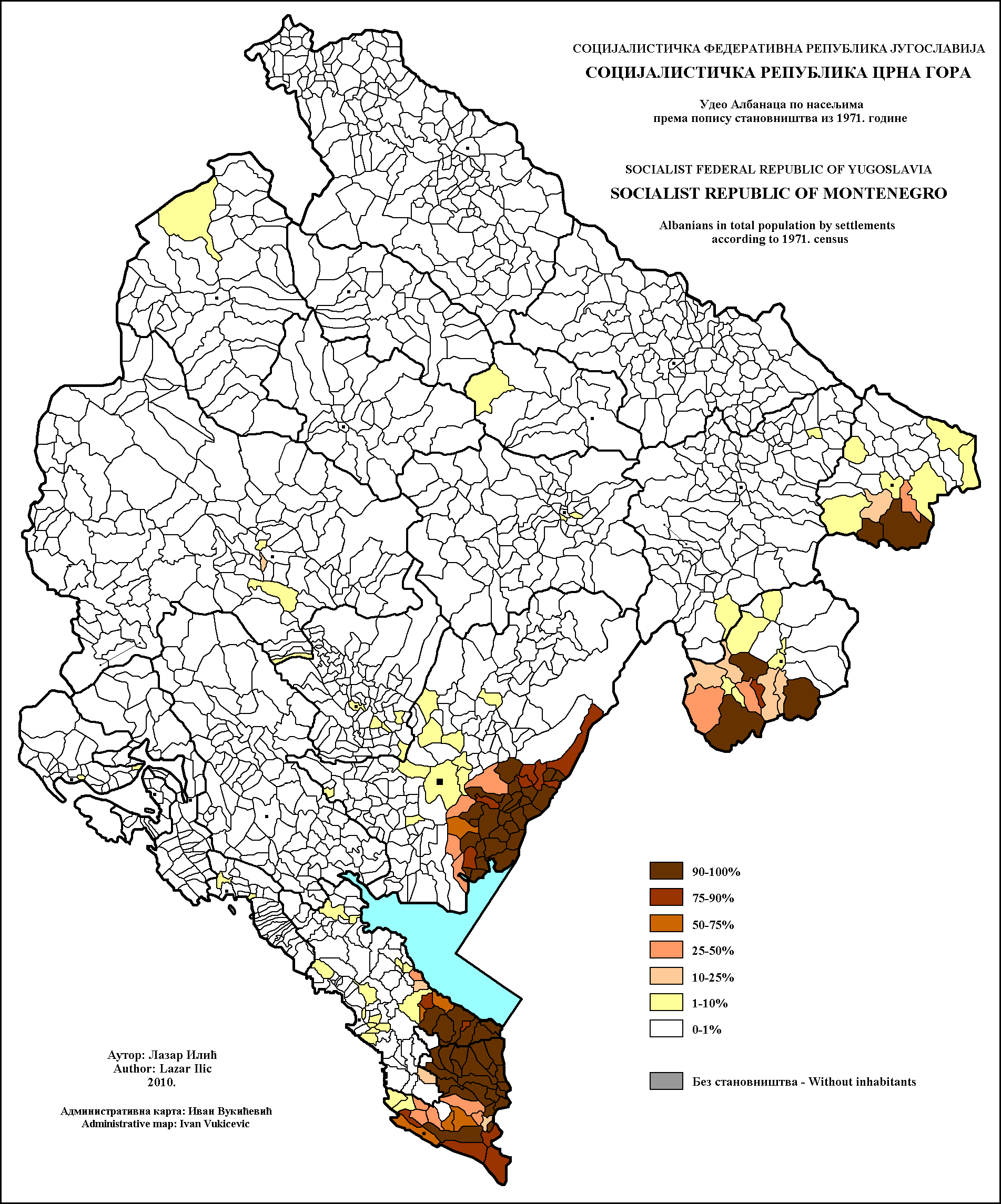
Percent of Albanians by settlements, 1971.

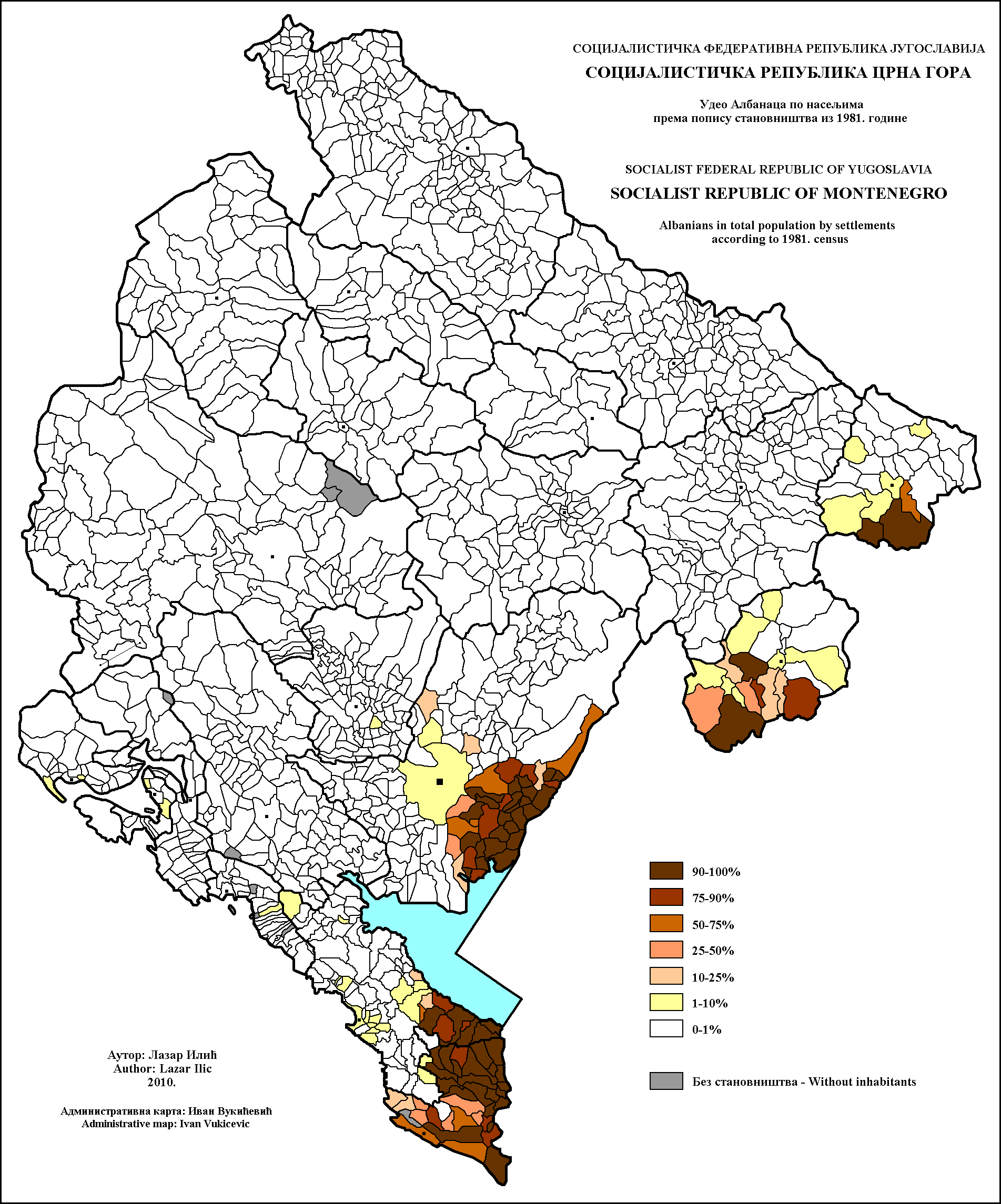
Percent of Albanians by settlements, 1981.

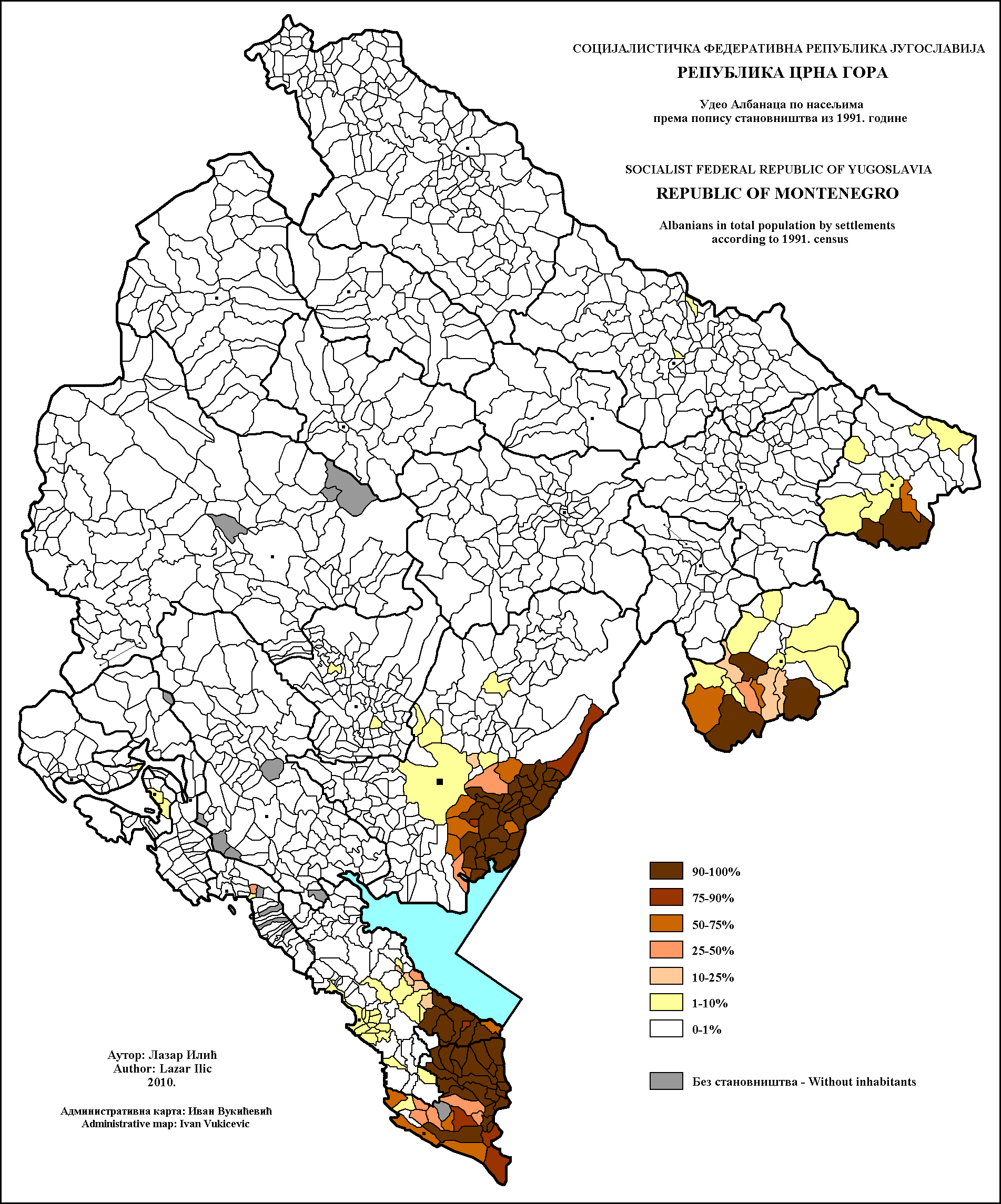
Percent of Albanians by settlements, 1991.

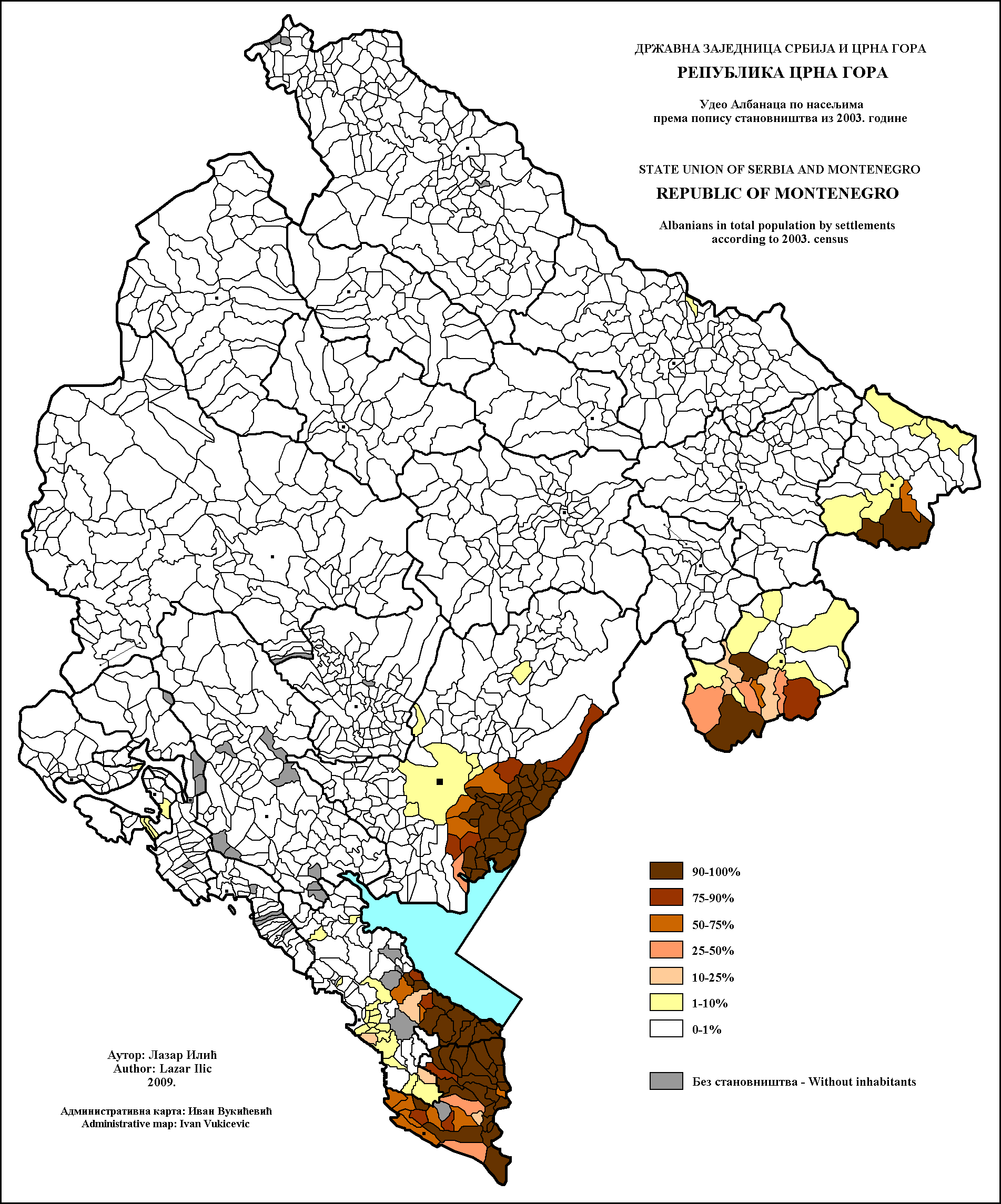
Percent of Albanians by settlements, 2003.

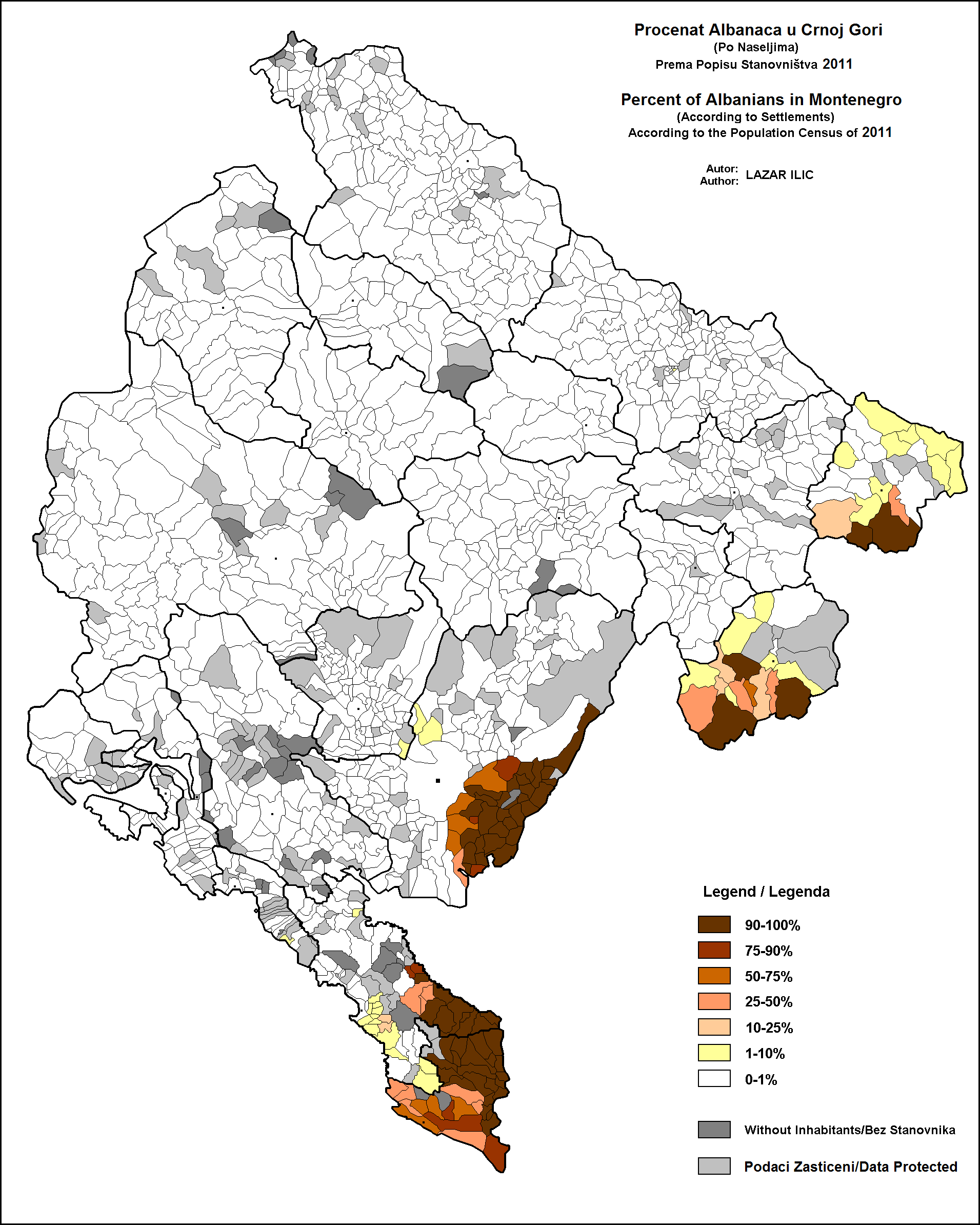
Percent of Albanians by settlements, 2011.

== Bibliography ==
- Bojović, Zlata (2008). Књижевност и стварност: Научни састанак слависта у Вукове дане, 12–15, IX 2007, МСЦ, Београд. Међународни славистички центар.
- Boeglin, Yves-Edouard (1968). "La rivière 'Lab' de Serbie". Onoma. 13 (2–3). International Centre of Onomastics: 319–332.
- Ahmetaj, Mehmet (2007). "Toponymy of Hoti". Studime Albanologjike. 37.
- Anamali, Skënder (2002). Historia e popullit shqiptar në katër vëllime [The history of the Albanian people in four volumes] (in Albanian). Vol. I. Botimet Toena. OCLC 52411919.
- Bartl, Peter (1968). Die albanischen Muslime zur Zeit der nationalen Unabhängigkeitsbewegung (1878–1912). Otto Harrassowitz Verlag.
- Blumi, Isa (2003). "Contesting the edges of the Ottoman Empire: Rethinking ethnic and sectarian boundaries in the Malësore, 1878–1912". International Journal of Middle East Studies. 35 (2): 237–256. doi:10.1017/s0020743803000102. JSTOR 3879619. S2CID 162217114.
- Curtis, Matthew (2012). Slavic-Albanian Language Contact, Convergence, and Coexistence. Ohio State University. ISBN 9781267580337.
- Demiraj, Shaban (2006). The origin of the Albanians: linguistically investigated. Tirana: Academy of Sciences of Albania. ISBN 978-99943-817-1-5.
- Elsie, Robert (2003). Early Albania: A reader of Historical texts, 11th–17th centuries. Wiesbaden: Otto Harrassowitz Verlag. ISBN 9783447047838.
- Elsie, Robert (2015). The Tribes of Albania: History, Society and Culture. I.B.Tauris. ISBN 978-0-85773-932-2.
- Fine, John Van Antwerp Jr. (1994) [1987]. The Late Medieval Balkans: A Critical Survey from the Late Twelfth Century to the Ottoman Conquest. Ann Arbor, Michigan: University of Michigan Press. ISBN 0-472-08260-4.
- Gawrych, George (2006). The Crescent and the Eagle: Ottoman rule, Islam and the Albanians, 1874–1913. London: IB Tauris. ISBN 9781845112875.
- Gruber, Siegfried (2008). "Household structures in urban Albania in 1918". The History of the Family. 13 (2): 138–151. doi:10.1016/j.hisfam.2008.05.002. S2CID 144626672.
- Iseni, Bashkim (2008). La question nationale en Europe du Sud-Est: genèse, émergence et développement de l'identité nationale albanaise au Kosovo et en Macédoine. Peter Lang. ISBN 9783039113200.
- Isaković, Antonije (1990). Kosovsko-metohijski zbornik. Srpska akademija nauka i umetnosti. ISBN 9788670251052.
- Ismajli, Rexhep (2015). Eqrem Basha (ed.). Studime për historinë e shqipes në kontekst ballkanik [Studies on the History of Albanian in the Balkan context] (PDF) (in Albanian). Prishtinë: Kosova Academy of Sciences and Arts, special editions CLII, Section of Linguistics and Literature.
- Katičić, Radoslav (1976). Ancient Languages of the Balkans. Mouton. ISBN 978-9027933058.
- Morrison, Kenneth (2018). Nationalism, Identity and Statehood in Post-Yugoslav Montenegro. Bloomsbury Publishing. ISBN 978-1474235198.
- Morozova, Maria (2019). "Language Contact in Social Context: Kinship Terms and Kinship Relations of the Mrkovići in Southern Montenegro". Journal of Language Contact. 12 (2): 305–343. doi:10.1163/19552629-01202003.
- Morozova, Maria; Rusakov, Alexander (2018). "SLAVIC-ALBANIAN INTERACTION IN VELJA GORANA: PAST AND PRESENT OF A BALANCED LANGUAGE CONTACT SITUATION". International Scientific Conference "Multiculturalism and Language Contact".
- Müller, Dietmar (2005). Staatsbürger aus Widerruf: Juden und Muslime als Alteritätspartner im rumänischen und serbischen Nationscode : ethnonationale Staatsbürgerschaftskonzepte 1878-1941. Otto Harrassowitz Verlag. ISBN 3447052481.
- Muñoz, Antonio J. (2001). The East Came West: Muslim, Hindu and Buddhist Volunteers in the German Armed Forces, 1941–1945. New York, New York: Axis Europa Books. ISBN 978-1-891227-39-4.
- Poláčková, Zuzana; Van Duin, Peter (2013). "Montenegro Old and New: History, Politics, Culture, and the People" (PDF). Studia Politica Slovaca. VI (1).
- Pulaha, Selami (1975). "Kontribut për studimin e ngulitjes së katuneve dhe krijimin e fiseve në Shqipe ̈rine ̈ e veriut shekujt XV-XVI' [Contribution to the Study of Village Settlements and the Formation of the Tribes of Northern Albania in the 15th century]". Studime Historike. 12.
- Redžepagić, Jašar (1970). Zhvillimi i arësimit dhe i sistemit shkollor të kombësisë shqiptare në teritorin e Jugosllavisë së sotme deri në vitin 1918. Enti i teksteve dhe i mjeteve mësimore i Krahinës Socialiste Autonome të Kosovës.
- Roberts, Elizabeth (2005). Realm of the Black Mountain: a history of Montenegro. London: Cornell University Press. ISBN 9780801446016.
- Skendi, Stavro (1967). The Albanian national awakening, 1878–1912. Princeton University Press. ISBN 9780691650029.
- Stanojević, Gligor; Vasić, Milan (1975). Istorija Crne Gore (3): od početka XVI do kraja XVIII vijeka. Titograd: Redakcija za istoriju Crne Gore. OCLC 799489791.
- Tošić, Jelena (2015). "City of the 'calm': Vernacular mobility and genealogies of urbanity in a southeast European borderland". Southeast European and Black Sea Studies. 15 (3): 391–408. doi:10.1080/14683857.2015.1091182.
- Treadway, John D (1983), "The Malissori Uprising of 1911", The Falcon and Eagle: Montenegro and Austria-Hungary, 1908–1914, West Lafayette, Ind.: Purdue University Press, ISBN 978-0-911198-65-2, OCLC 9299144
- Verli, Marenglen (2007). Shqipëria dhe Kosova: historia e një aspirate (studiume historike, kumtesa, dokumente dhe ilustrime). Botimpex. ISBN 978-9994380145.
- Vickers, Miranda (1999). The Albanians: a modern history. I.B.Tauris. ISBN 978-1-86064-541-9.
