= Lužani (people) =

The Lužani (Serbian Cyrillic: Лужани) were a medieval people in Zeta who inhabited the county of Luška župa, located in the Zeta valley, north to present-day Podgorica. Originating from a mixture of Slavic and pre-Slavic populations, the Lužani were likely gradually assimilated by local tribes, mainly the Bjelopavlići and the Pješivci, following the Ottoman conquest of the area in the late 15th century.

== Geography ==
The county of Luška župa, inhabited by the Lužani, covered the area of the Zeta River valley, north of present-day Podgorica, including the territories of the later tribes of the Bjelopavlići, the Pješivci and parts of the Piperi. The name of the Lužani has been retained in several localities in the region, in particular the villages of Lužani and Lužnica, north of Podgorica.

== Origins ==
The name Lužani comes from Slavic lug (forest) and as such, Lužani means people of the forest.

Based on Petar Šobajić's work, most scholars consider that the Lužani were only partly Slavic and resulted from the mixing of Slavic newcomers with pre-Slavic romanized populations, mostly the Španje.

However, Bogumil Hrabak suggests that they were immigrants of Albanian origin, like several other tribes from the area.

== History ==
First mentioned in Constantine VII Porphyrogenitus' work De Administrando Imperio as Lug Duklje, the area inhabited by the Lužani is quoted as a župa in a Ragusan document from 1318, as Luscha giopa. The Lužani as a people are mentioned in the 15th century, in particular in 1455 when, fearing the arrival of the Ottomans, they signed a declaration of loyalty to the Venetians on the island of Vranjina, together with the Bjelopavlići, the Mataguži, the Malonšići and other local tribes, towns and villages.

In the late 15th century and especially following the Ottoman conquest, which broke up the structures of the medieval state of Zeta, the Lužani were gradually assimilated into local tribes, mainly the Bjelopavlići and the Pješivci, and, in part, the Piperi.

== Sources ==
- Bešić, Zarije; Garašanin, Draga; Garašanin, Milutin; Kovačević, Jovan (1967). Istorija Crne Gore: Od najstarijih vremena do kraja XII vijeka (in Serbian). Vol. 1. Titograd: Redakcija za Istoriju Crne Gore.
- Kovijanić, Risto (1974). Pomeni crnogorskih plemena u kotorskim spomenicima (XIV–XVI vijek) [Mentions of Montenegrin tribes in Kotor records (14th–16th centuries)] (in Serbian). Vol. II. Titograd: Istorijski institut SR Crne Gore.
- Kulišić, Špiro (1980). O etnogenezi Crnogoraca [On the ethnogenesis of Montenegrins] (in Serbian). Titograd: Pobjeda.
- Hrabak, Bogumil (1981). "Razgranavanje katuna i stvaranje grupa katuna, odnosno plemena u nekadašnjoj Hercegovini (XIII-XV vek)". Predmet i metod izučavanja patrijarhalnih zajednica u Jugoslaviji: radovi sa naučnog skupa, Titograd 23. i 24. novembra 1978. godine (in Serbian). Titograd: CANU. pp. 181–200.
- Palavestra, Vlajko (1971). "Folk traditions of the ancient populations of the Dinaric region". Wissenschaftliche Mitteilungen des Bosnisch-Herzegowinischen Landesmuseums: Volkskunde. 1 (B). Sarajevo: Zemaljski muzej Bosne i Hercegovine: 13–98.
- Šobajić, Petar (1996) [1923]. Bjelopavlići i Pješivci (in Serbian). Podgorica: CID. ISBN 9788649500129.
- Vucinich, Wayne S. (1975). A study in social survival: the katun in Bileća Rudine. Denver: University of Denver.
