= Španje =

Medieval people from Montenegro

The Španje (Cyrillic: Шпањe) were a medieval people who inhabited parts of Upper Zeta and the region of Nikšić, in present-day Montenegro. They were considered to be descended from an indigenous Balkan people who preceded the Slavs in the area.

== Geography ==
They inhabited the region of Nikšić and the valley of the river Zeta in modern-day Montenegro. They have left traces in some toponyms from Montenegro, such as Španjska gradina in Spuž, Španjsko katunište on mount Vražegrmac, and Španji potok ("Španji Stream") in the Riječka nahija. In Kosovo, the Švanjski most, near Gjakova, is thought to have been originally named Španjski most, after the Španje.

== Oral traditions ==
The Španje are mostly remembered through the oral traditions of Montenegrin tribes such as the Bjelopavlići, Pješivci and Cuce, and among Albanians from Northern Albania and Western Kosovo. According to folk legends, they were the oldest inhabitants in the region, while also being in frequent conflict with many other tribes such as the Macure or the Bukumiri.

== History ==
Following the works of Jovan Erdeljanović and Petar Šobajić, the Španje are generally considered a pre-Slavic, "Old Balkanic" people, namely Romanized Illyrians. They were gradually assimilated by the Slavs during the Middle Ages, mainly by the Lužani with whom they mingled. Špiro Kulišić derives their name from Old Greek spanios, meaning 'naked', which might have been used by Greeks for the Illyrian inhabitants of the "naked" karst mountains; similarly, the name Pješivci derives from Slavic plješiv meaning 'bald', and could have been attributed to the inhabitants of those "naked" mountains (in Serbian, the demonym would be golobrđani).

Some scholars consider them to have been of Albanian origin.

== Legacy ==
The Albanian Spani family, active in Shkodër and Drivast in the 14th and 15th centuries, might have been related to the Španje. It is also presumed that the noble Španić family of Korčula originated from the Spani, as well as one of its branches who lived in Šibenik.

In present-day Montenegro, surnames can be found stemming from the Španj root. As a nickname or family name, Španj can also be used, with a potentially offensive meaning at its basis. Some old Pješivci brotherhoods, some of which have a separate or even lower social status, are said to be descended from the Španje. In the old Katunska Nahija, it was considered an insult to call someone "Španja from Španja" (Serbian: Španja od Španja).

== Annotations ==
1. Otherwise known as Španji (Serbian: Шпањн), Spani, Spano, Shpani or Španci (Serbian: Шпанци).

== Sources ==
- Andrić, Jasna (1984). "Osvrt na neke od podataka Štefana Kocijančiča u Arkivu za povjestnicu jugoslavensku, na njihovo značenje i ulogu u našim znanstvenim istraživanjima" [A review of some of Stefan Kocijančič's data in the Archive for Yugoslav History, their meaning and role in our scientific research]. Etnološka tribina (in Croatian). 13 (6–7): 147–164.
- Barjaktarović, Mirko R. (1984). Rovca: etnološka monografija. CANU.
- — (1977). "Етнолошки преглед". Etnološki pregled [Revue d'etnologie]. 14. Etnološko društvo Jugoslavije.
- — (1977). "Bulletin du Museé de la République Socialiste de Bosnie-Hercegovine à Sarajevo". Glasnik Zemaljskog muzeja BiH: Etnologija. 32/34. Sarajevo.
- Gashi, Skënder (2015). Kërkime onomastike-historike për minoritete të shuara e aktuale të Kosovës [Onomastic-historical research on extinct and actual minorities of Kosova] (PDF) (in Albanian). Pristina: Akademia e Shkencave dhe e Arteve e Kosovës. ISBN 9789951615488.
- Kovijanić, Risto (1974). Crnogorska plemena u kotorskim spomenicima (XIV–XVI vijek) [Montenegrin tribes in Bay of Kotor records (XIV–XVI century)]. Titograd: Istorijski institut SR Crne Gore.
- Kulišić, Špiro (1980). O etnogenezi Crnogoraca (in Montenegrin). Pobjeda.
- Palavestra, Vlajko (1971). "Folk traditions of the ancient populations of the Dinaric region". Wissenschaftliche Mitteilungen des Bosnisch-Herzegowinischen Landesmuseums: Volkskunde. 1 (B). Sarajevo: Zemaljski muzej Bosne i Hercegovine: 13–98.
- Radovanović, Milovan (2004). Etnički i demografski procesi na Kosovu i Metohiji. Liber Press. ISBN 9788675560180.
- Radovanović, Milovan (2008). Kosovo i Metohija: antropogeografske, istorijskogeografske, demografske i geopolitičke osnove. Službeni Glasnik. ISBN 9788675497806.
- Šobajić, Petar (1996) [1923]. Bjelopavlići i Pješivci. Cid. ISBN 9788649500129.
