= Mataguzi =

Mataguzi may refer to:

- Mataguzi (tribe), an Albanian tribe of the Middle Ages
- Mataguži, a village located in the area of settlement of the tribe
