= Malonšići =

Historical tribe of Montenegro

Malonšići (in older forms: Malončići and Malonjšiki, Montenegrin Cyrillic: Малоншићи) was a historical tribe (pleme) of Albanian origin and area in the Brda region of Montenegro. Malonšići were located between modern Danilovgrad and Podgorica. By the late 15th century they were slavicized and later assimilated into Bjelopavlići.

== Etymology ==
The Malonšići were of Albanian origin. Their name is related to the Albanian word mal (mountain), a toponym and anthroponym which is very frequent among Albanian communities in modern Montenegro. The locality of Malenza in their home territory has been connected by P. Šobajić to their name and has been interpreted as a compound mal and zi (black). Expanding on this, Ivan Božić considered this to be an indication that the tribe originated in the region of Mali i Zi, northern Albania.

== Geography ==
The tribe encompassed parts of what was later Zagarač, Komani and Bjelopavlići. The area of the Malonšići is located in southern Danilovgrad Municipality and northern Podgorica municipality. The tribe lived in the basin of the Zeta, Sušica and Mareza rivers.

== History ==
The first reference to the Malonšići comes from a letter issued by the Serbian Chancellery in Dubrovnik in 1411. The document, a complaint from Ragusan people addressed to Jelena Balšić, is about the looting committed by the Malonšići, together with the Bjelopavlići, Ozrinići and Maznice, on Ragusan merchants on their way through Zeta while they were returning from Serbia.

In 1452 they were one of the tribes which supported Stefan Crnojević against Đurađ Branković and in 1455 along with Crnojević they swore fealty to Venice in the Vranjina Monastery. Some of them after the conquest of the region by the Ottoman Empire fled their homeland and settled in Venetian territories, Kotor in particular. The tribe appears as part of the communities who paid taxes to Đurađ Crnojević who was an Ottoman vassal. In the defters of the Sanjak of Montenegro from 1521 to 1582/3 under Skender Bey Crnojević, they are listed as a distinct nahiya. In the 1521 defter, their settlements were Vranići, Kosići, Bjeločani, Spuž, Bogišići, Radonjići, Grlov Kuk, Pavlovići, Vladovići, Lješevići, Jednoši, Lužnica Zur, Kalođurđevići and Zagreda and had a total of 150 households. In the 1523 defter Malonšići was one of seven nahiye of the sanjak of Montenegro. In the 1570 defter of the Montenegro Vilayet they were still a distinct community as a nahiya and had a total of 175 households and 12 baština which paid a 5,610 akçe in taxes. Over time they were slavicized. After 1582-83 they were no more a distinct community and became part of Bjelopavlići. Šobajić considered the Malonšići to have been related to, or a branch of, the Španje (Shpani) and notes that they inhabited Zagarač and Kosovi Lug in Bjelopavlić.

== Sources ==
- Babić, Vladimir; Čubrilović, Vaso; Đurđev, Branislav; Filipović, Nedim; Gestrin, Ferdo; Grafenauer, Bogo; Klaić, Nada; Lape, Ljuben; Lebl, Arpad; Mitrović, Mitra; Moačanin, Fedor; Tadić, Jorjo; Zwitter, Fran (1959). Historija naroda Jugoslavije (in Serbo-Croatian). Vol. 2. Zagreb: Izdavačko poduzeće „Školska knjiga”.
- Đurđev, Branislav (1953). Turska vlast u Crnoj Gori u XVI i XVII veku: prilog jednom nerešenom pitanju iz naše istorije (in Serbian). Svjetlost.
- Đurđev, Branislav; Hadžiosmanović, Lamija (1973). Dva deftera Crne Gore iz vremena Skender-bega Crnojevića (PDF) (in Serbo-Croatian). Akademija nauka i umjetnosti Bosne i Hercegovine.
- Eichler, Ernst; Hilty, Gerold, eds. (2008). Namenforschung / Name Studies / Les noms propres. 1. Halbband. De Gruyter. ISBN 978-3-11-020342-4.
- Radusinović, Pavle S. (1985). Naselja stare Crne Gore: poslednji dio (in Serbian). Srpska akademija nauka i umetnosti.
- Stojanović, Ljubomir, ed. (1929). Stare srpske povelje i pisma [Old Serbian charters and letters] (in Serbian). Vol. I/1. Belgrade: Srpska Kraljevska Akademija.
