= Kriči =

Albanian tribe

The Kriči (Serbian Cyrillic: Кричи, Albanian: Kriçi) are a Montenegrin tribe that inhabited the region around the Tara river, roughly corresponding to the modern region of Mojkovac. Under similar names, the Kriči have been periodically mentioned in historical sources, geographical and ethnological literature. As other pre-Slavic tribes in the region, they eventually assimilated into the Serb ethnos. Some toponyms in Montenegro and surnames are derived from the name of this tribe.

== Etymology ==
Vladimir Ćorović (1885–1941) and Tatomir Vukanović (1907–1997) argued that the name derived from Thracian krisio, or Illyrian krüsi, which according to the Albanian term kryeziu would mean "dark, dark-haired or swarthy people". Petar Skok noted that in Serbo-Croatian, kričiti and kriknuti means "shouting"; kričak means a "person who shouts". As such, Andrija Luburić and Mitar Pešikan presumed that the Kriči received their name from the Serbs because, supposedly, they "shouted" when they spoke.

== History ==
The Kriči lived in the region of the Tara river, with authors such as Bogumil Hrabak and Petrit Imami including them in a wave of other Albanian pastoral migrant groups, such as the Mataruge, the Žurovići and the Burmazi, who in the 12th and 13th centuries immigrated across the Zeta to the Neretva. It is established that there were "Arbanassi (Albanian) groups" in the Tara region in 1278. During the 14th centuries, the Albanian katuns had been largely assimilated by numerous Vlach communities, who were themselves in a process of Slavicisation.

The term Kričan is mentioned as a region in the 1260 charter of Stefan Uroš I regarding the borders of the village of Prošćenje (near Mojkovac); Kričan bordered this village to the north. The toponym may have given its name to the people, or vice versa. In ca. 1300, the personal name Kričan was mentioned.

The Kriči were involved in multiple violent conflicts with the Drobnjaci tribe, at some point under their voivode (chieftain), Kalok, and eventually moved over the Tara river. They inhabited lands from Sutjeska to Kolašin, and their centre was in Pljevlja, with the local toponym of Kričak lying between Pljevlja and Bijelo Polje. In his anthropological work, Drobnjak (1902), Svetozar Tomić mentioned that the Španje and the Kričove were the old populations of Drobnjak.

Documents from Kotor mention a certain Lore Kričko (Lore de Criçco) in 1326, and Kriče Vitomirov (Crice Vitomiri) in 1327. Archives from Dubrovnik mention Dobrija and Đurađ Nenadić from Krički (de Crizche) in 1453. The Ottoman defter of 1477 recorded the nahija of Kričak, with 5 džemat (katuns); one under knez Jarosav and another under Nikola, son of Kričko. In 1492, a certain David Kričković was recorded in Poljica in Dalmatia. In 1528, Nikola Grubanović Kričak from the village of Kruševica transcribed a Church book. In the monastery of Hilandar from the 16th or 17th centuries, a certain Filip Kričak and several his Kričak relatives were mentioned. In 1694, the priest Radojica Kričak was mentioned in Drniš, while priest Maksim Kričković was mentioned in 1762.

Their tribal name remained in the anthroponomy (surname Kričković), and toponymy of lands where lived; Kričak and Kričačko polje in Sinjajevina, Kričina near Bribir, village Kričke near Drniš, another two homonymous villages near Pakrac, and Kričići near Jajce.

== Legacy ==
Various folk traditions have been preserved and recorded on the Kriči and their history. As concluded in Vlahović 1970, folk tradition on the Kriči is very different, although it is clear by tradition and literature that the tribe lived as an independent unit, and at one point in time included a relatively large area.

According to oral tradition, the Kriči inhabited Jezera and Šaranci, and a good part of Sinjajevina. A folk tradition transmitted by the Joksimović brotherhood in Bijelo Polje held that the Kriči descended from the Illyrians, "but today there are no more of their direct descendants". Another belief recorded by P. Rudić, likely influenced by literature, was that the Kriči may have been descendants of Saxons (Sasi) that worked in the mines of Brskovo and around Pljevlja.

A. Luburić (1891–1944), describes a folk tradition of the Drobnjaci, in which they are recounted as being part of the Mataruge tribe, who after the first onrush of Slavs in Herzegovina and the death of Mataruge king Sumor at the end of the 7th or beginning of the 8th century, retreated to the areas around the Tara. Here, the Serbs gave the tribe the name Kriči, because their speech sounded like "shouting" (kričanje). The tribe accepted the name, and it spread in the middle Potarje.

According to M. Peruničić and P. Čabarkapa (born ca. 1880), and confirmed in a similar tradition by B. Ćorović (born ca. 1894) and the younger S. Bojović of Pljevlja, the Kriči were once a numerous tribe living in the region of Kričak (southeast of Kosanica), whilst the Mataruge had only comprised one of its many brotherhoods. According to Vlahović, this tradition is "supported" by the fact that the region of Mataruge is smaller and taken as a peripheral part of the larger, in the widest sense, Kričak region. Conversely, folk tradition in Polimlje and Potarje holds that the Mataruge are unrelated to the Kriči. The locals of the Kričak region call the village of Kričak, Krčak, because it allegedly was the place of a "Greek warrior settlement".

== Annotations ==
1. Sometimes referred to as Kričkovi, Kričovi, or Kričci.

== See also ==
- Vlachs in medieval Serbia
- Vlachs in medieval Bosnia and Herzegovina
- Tribes of Montenegro

== Sources ==
- Kovijanić, Risto (1974). Crnogorska plemena u kotorskim spomenicima (XIV–XVI vijek) [Montenegrin tribes in Bay of Kotor records (XIV–XVI century)]. Titograd: Istorijski institut SR Crne Gore.
- Loma, Aleksandar (2019). "Some linguistic observations on the ancient Slavs and their expansion". Балкан, Подунавље и Источна Европа у римско доба и у раном средњем веку [Balkans, the Danube Region and Eastern Europe in Roman era and in the early Middle Ages] (PDF) (in Russian and English). Museum of Vojvodina. pp. 29–45. ISBN 9788681086155.
- Etnološko društvo Jugoslavije (1977). Revue d'etnologie. Vol. 14. Etnološko društvo Jugoslavije.
- Skok, Petar (1972). Etimologijski rječnik hrvatskoga ili srpskoga jezika: K-poni. Jugoslavenska akademija znanosti i umjetnosti. p. 188. ISBN 978-86-407-0064-1.
- Veljković, Žarko B. (2020). "Drobnjaci: etimologija" [Drobnjaci – etymology of the ethnonym]. Romanoslavica. LVII (1): 67–78.
