= Upper Zeta =

Historical region in Montenegro

Upper Zeta during the 15th century

Upper Zeta (Serbian: Горња Зета / Gornja Zeta) is a historical region in modern Montenegro, situated roughly between the Morača and Zeta rivers in east-west direction, and between massif of Lovćen and Skadar Lake and Durmitor massif in south-north direction, encompassing the Zeta Plain and plain surrounding modern-day capital of Montenegro, Podgorica. During the Middle Ages, the province of Upper Zeta was part of the Serbian state under the Nemanjić dynasty, existing alongside Lower Zeta. It was then held by the Balšić and Crnojević noble families until the Ottoman conquest (1496). In the early modern period, the term was used for an area in the northern half of the "Old Montenegro" region, though its borders fluctuated.

== Term ==
Upper and Lower Zeta were mentioned in medieval documents. Lower Zeta included the maritime belt from the Luštica bay and Grbalj to the Bojana river, while Upper Zeta spanned over a branch of the Lovćen mountain below Kotor to the eastern banks of the Skadar Lake and Zeta river. Mentioning of Upper and Lower Zeta in the 15th and 16th century are scarce. Reliable documents show that up until the end of the 15th century, the term Zeta was simply used encompassing Pješivci, Malonšići, Očinići, Lopate and Bjelice.

== History ==
During the 15th century, regions of Upper and Lower Zeta had somewhat different histories. As a maritime region, Lower Zeta was exposed to expansion of the Venetian Republic, while mountainous regions of Upper Zeta remained under control of local lords. At the end of September 1441, the Bosnian grand duke, Stefan Vukčić Kosača, captured the territory of Upper Zeta on the left bank of Morača river. Stefan Crnojević, who represented the whole Crnojević family, joined him in this campaign and was awarded by Kosača with control over five villages. He kept two of them (Goričane and Kruse) under his control and gave the other three to his brothers. After the disappearance of Stefan's brother Gojčin from political life in 1451, Stefan became the ruler of a large part of Upper Zeta, strengthening his position by recognizing the authority of the Republic of Venice, entitled as duke of Upper Zeta (after 1452). The reasons of the alliance are related to his anticipation of the downfall of the Serbian Despot. Venetian doge Francesco Foscari wrote a letter to Stefan in 1455 asking him to return to Budva its territory he captured. In 1455 the Ottomans invaded Serbia and conquered all of its territories south of the Western Morava river, completely cutting Zeta off from the core of the Despotate. Therefore, Stefan Crnojević along with representatives of Upper Zeta signed an agreement that same year with the Venetians in Vranjina, by which Upper Zeta accepted Venetian supreme rule. Venice came to rule only the cities, while all internal affairs were left to duke Stefan. Venice also bound itself not to mettle with the ecclesiastical authority of the Orthodox Metropolitanate.

== See also ==
- Lower Zeta
- Zeta (crown land)
- Principality of Zeta
- Zeta under the Balšići
- Zeta under the Crnojevići

== Sources ==
- Божић, Иван (1970). "Зета у Деспотовини". Историја Црне Горе (PDF). Vol. књ. 2, св. 2. Титоград: Редакција за историју Црне Горе. pp. 135–275.
- Божић, Иван (1979). Немирно Поморје XV века. Београд: Српска књижевна задруга.
- Ćirković, Sima (1964). Историја средњовековне босанске државе [History of the medieval Bosnian state] (in Serbian). Srpska književna zadruga.
- Ćirković, Sima (2004). The Serbs. Malden: Blackwell Publishing. ISBN 9781405142915.
- Fine, John Van Antwerp Jr. (1994) [1987]. The Late Medieval Balkans: A Critical Survey from the Late Twelfth Century to the Ottoman Conquest. Ann Arbor, Michigan: University of Michigan Press. ISBN 0472082604.
- Станојевић, Глигор (1975). "Црна Гора у XVI вијеку". Историја Црне Горе. Vol. књ. 3, св. 1. Титоград: Редакција за историју Црне Горе. pp. 1–88.
