= Albanian National Council =

Coordinates: 41.929258°N 19.221707°E

Albanian National Council Albanian: Këshilli Nacional i Shqiptarëve Montenegrin: Nacionalni Savjet Albanaca
- The council has adopted the flag of Albania.
- Abbreviation: KNSH
- Formation: June 23, 2008; 18 years ago
- Purpose: Protection of Albanian interests
- Headquarters: Ulcinj, Montenegro
- Region served: Montenegro
- Official language: Albanian
- President: Faik Nika
- Website: www.knsh.me
- Remarks

The Albanian National Council (Albanian: Këshilli Nacional i Shqiptarëve, Montenegrin: Nacionalni Savjet Albanaca) is an institution of self governance for the Albanian minority in Montenegro. The council was founded in 2008 in Ulcinj.

The council has 12 permanent commissions:

- Commission for provisions
- Commission for cooperation with Albanians in other countries
- Commission for state relations
- Commission for education
- Commission for information
- Commission for official use of Albanian language
- Commission for culture
- Commission for finances and economy
- Commission for space planning
- Commission for tourism, sport and environment
- Commission for agriculture
- Commission for appeals
