= Pješivci =

Historical tribe and region in Montenegro

Pješivci (Serbian and Montenegrin Cyrillic: Пјешивци; pronounced [pjê̞ʃiːʋt͡si]) was a historical tribe and region in Montenegro, consisting of numerous brotherhoods of mutual origin. It was one of the largest tribe from the area of Katunska nahija of Old Montenegro.

The Orthodox monasteries of Doljani and Cerovo are located within the tribal area.

== Geography ==
The region is located by the Upper Zeta river. To the north lies the Nikšići tribe, to the south lies the Ozrinići tribe, farther southwest lies the Cuce tribe, while across the river (eastwards) are the Bjelopavlići.

== History ==
=== Early history ===
Pješivci are firstly mentioned in 1455 (as "Plesnuzi") in the contract between Stefan Crnojević and the people from Upper Zeta with the Venetians. The history of the tribe and its clans can be tracked with greater interest from the second half of the 16th century, the period when the first detailed written sources are found. Bogdan is possibly the "founder" of the tribe, both per the myth, as well as according to the evidence from Turkish writings. Bogdan was born around 1430 and by reconstructing the events, myths and Turkish writings, it is found that his father's name was Bogavac, but it is not known whether he, like Bogdan, was the duke of Ivan Crnojević. Bogdan was originally from Banjska, in Old Serbia. According to the writings of Petar Šobajić, Bogdan was either a Serbian knez or vojvoda, and he and his brother Grujica migrated to what became the Pješivci tribal area after the Battle of Kosovo (1448). When the reign of Crnojevići was over, the Pješivci tribe fell under the Ottoman Empire, and remained under Ottoman reign because of unfavorable geographical position.

=== 16th century ===
The Ottoman census of 1582–83 registered the "vilayet of the Black Mountain" (vilayet-i Kara Dağ), part of the Sanjak of Scutari, as having the following nahiyah, with number of villages: Grbavci with 13 villages, Župa with 11, Malonšići with 7, Pješivci with 14, Cetinje with 16, Rijeka with 31, Crmnica with 11, Paštrovići with 36 and Grbalj with 9 villages; a total of 148 villages.

=== Early modern period ===
At the beginning of the 17th century, when the assembly of tribal chiefs decided to revolt against the Ottomans, the Pješivci tribe joined forces with other tribes. On the assembly in Kuči (1614), the Pješivci were guided by Prince Andrija. However, during the Montenegrin rebellion from 1684-1685, the Pješivci stayed neutral (as it is written in Venetian reports).

== Anthropology ==
Brotherhoods

- Mijušković
- Nikčević
- Kontić
- Perunović
- Vukićević
- Lješković
- Lalatović
- Perović
- Magovčević
- Pavićević
- Marković
- Savićević
- Backović
- Škuletić
- Banjević
- Antović
- Adžić
- Striković

== Notable people ==
- Mirko Banjević, Montenegrin journalist and poet
- Petar Perunović, famous gusle player
- Slađana Perunović, Montenegrin long-distance runner
- Miodrag Perunović, former Montenegrin professional boxer
- Dejan Savićević, famous Montenegrin footballer
- Mirko Vučinić, Montenegrin football player
- Petar Škuletić, Montenegrin and Serbian football player
- Radoje Kontić, Montenegrin politician
- Vojislav Nikčević, Montenegrin linguist
- Ivan Nikčević, Serbian handball player
- Sandra Nikčević, Montenegrin handball player
- Zdravko Radulović, Montenegrin-born former Croatian basketball player
