= Macure =

Former tribe of Montenegro

The Macure were a tribe that lived on the territory of modern-day Montenegro which is today known as Šekular. Like other non-Slavic tribes of Montenegro, they were either assimilated or expelled. Some scholars consider them to have been of Albanian origin while other scholars believe they were of Vlach origin. Today, their name is preserved in local Serbian legends and myths, while their name is sometimes used in Montenegro as derogative.

== Origin ==
Milan Šufflay was the first to set the hypothesis that Macure were of Albanian origin. This hypothesis about Macure was accepted by anthropologist Nikola Pantelić.

Jovan Erdeljanović believed they were of Vlach origin whose name was derived from some Roman word which basis was mazz.

== History ==
Like all other non-Slavic tribes of Montenegro, Macure were also completely assimilated or expelled by Slavs. Macure became a derogative term in Montenegro, which is the case with names of other conquered and expelled tribes of Lužani, Bukumiri, Mataruge and others.

With Ottoman incursion into Serbian Despotate and Zeta, Macure, Mataruge and Kriči migrated in two directions. The first was across Eastern Bosnia and Central Bosnia, into Western and North Western Bosnia. The second was across Herzegovina and Dalmatia.

== Legacy ==
Macure are commemorated in Serbian legends and myths. According to Serbian legends, they were tall and strong people. The Serb legends say that they saw snow for the first time when they came to Sinjajevina in Montenegro and made a snowball to bring it back to show it to their friends which soon melt in their hands.

According to Erdeljanović, the toponym Macur-jama in Piperi territory has its origin in the name of the Macure tribe.

A word Macurovine (transl. meadow), a first name Macur (recorded in 1575) and a surname Macura (recorded since 17th century) is derived from the name of the Macure tribe.

== Sources ==
- Пантелић, Никола (1983). Гласник Етнографског музеја у Београду књ. 47. Etnografski muzej u Beogradu. GGKEY:66N5JNKFLFP.
- Čajkanović, Veselin (1994). Sabrana dela iz srpske religije i mitologije: Studije iz srpske religije i folklora, 1925-1942. Srpska književna zadruga. ISBN 9788637902812.
- Cvijić, Jovan (1987). Sabrana dela: pt. 1. Antropogeografski spisi. Srpska akademija nauka i umetnosti. ISBN 9788639100445.
- Đurić, Vojislav (1972). Научници. Матица српска.
- Popović, Bogdan; Skerlić, Jovan (1937). Srpski književni glasnik.
- Vukanović, Tatomir P. (1974). Etnogeneza Južnih Slovena. Narodni muzej.
