= Špiro Kulišić =

Montenegrin ethnologist (1908–89)

Špiro Kulišić (Serbo-Croat Cyrillic: Шпиро Кулишић; Perast 1908 — Belgrade 1989) was a Montenegrin ethnologist and one of the founders of the Montenegrin autochthonist school. He contributed to ethnology and museology in Bosnia and Herzegovina and Serbia. His research interests were in tribal organization in the Dinaric region, ethnic history and relations between the Slavs and indigenous population in the Balkan, and religion among the Serbs and Montenegrins.

== Biography ==
Kulišić was born in 1908, in the city of Perast at the Bay of Kotor. He studied ethnology at the University of Belgrade Faculty of Philosophy between 1927 and 1933. He worked as a teacher in Croatia and Bosnia, while during the eve of World War II joined the partisan movement and Yugoslav communist party.

He worked in the post-war Ministry of Education and Ministry of Science in Bosnia and Herzegovina as the official in charge of scientific institutions and associations, the National Museum (1947–1950), and Institute of Folklore Studies in Sarajevo. With Milenko Filipović, he was the most active ethnologist in Bosnia and Herzegovina, and since 1965 was a permanent research fellow of the Center for Balkan Studies of ANUBiH. In the early 1960s became the post director of the Ethnographic Museum, Belgrade. He withdrew from the institutional work in 1963, and continued to publish writings until the early 1980s. He died in 1989.

=== Work ===
Until the 1970s the Yugoslavian ethnology was a blend of evolutionary anthropology and Marxist historical materialism. In his work Ideological and Theoretical Grounds for the Development of Our Ethnographic Museum (1953) criticized the inter-war museological practice, as well introduced a new name for the discipline, ethnography instead of ethnology. He strongly criticized the Soviet ethnography, its absolutization of science and the chauvinistic Pan-Slavism. He noted that since the establishment of Kingdom of Yugoslavia (1914) the ethnology was a subject of political oppression by the centralist regime, while the Serbian bourgeois ethnology (and its school founded by Jovan Cvijić and Jovan Erdeljanović) which also originated in the 19th century, worked on the political class assumptions and ethnocentric premises. Such political hegemony influenced the museology which presented integralist Yugoslav and Serbian ethnocentrism, while underestimated the development of minority groups, as well supported methodological formalism.

There existed scholarship rivality between Kulišić and Serbian scholar Milenko Filipović. Kulišić supported "antiquarian ethnology", while Filipović "social ethnology", they debated on the structural functionalism, which resulted with Kulišić accusation of Filipović for anti-historicism, their broken cooperation, and Kulišić withdrawal of Ph.D. degree dissertation on Christmas ritual breads.

The work by Manojlo Glušević, Ethnography, Ethnology, and Anthropology (1963), which criticized the Erdeljanović's idea of ethnology as discipline of nations, ethnicity and ethnogenesis, and in the core the putative history idea based on hypothetical reconstructions on the basis of unreliable oral tradition, was objected by Kulišić for neglecting historicity of man's existence. The Kulišić's tendency for using Marxist quotes and negative labels in theoretical discussion was later called as "Špirinism".

In 1973 wrote a paradoxal lament on the Marxism in the Yugoslav science during its trend of liberalization.

He researched the pre-Christian religion, mythology and tradition. He considered patriarchy as the historical next stage from matriarchy, and that the South Slavs had a matriarchal origin, contrary to the Yugoslav historiography consideration that during the Slavic migration there was transition in the Balkan, yet had patrilineal-patrilocal family and military-democratic social system. Kulišić considered zadruga (cooperative) a transitory form, like Vlach katuns and fraternity, that they lack patriarchal structure, and showed an archaic Balkan historical longevity and adjustment to the new socio-economical formations (like feudalism).

=== Ethnogenesis of Montenegrins ===
His most influential work is the book Ethnogenesis of Montenegrins (O etnogenezi Crnogoraca) which was published in the Montenegrin capital of Titograd (modern-day Podgorica) by the state Pobjeda in 1980. This work sparked a huge amount of controversy and interest in the general, scholarly and political public, as since the 1960s there was a developing theory on the autochthonous school about the Montenegrin ethnic origin, whereas the most widespread one until then was that Montenegrins were of Serb ethnic background. It was Kulišić's final confrontation against the 19th century national-romanticist approach of Serbian anthropology, and positivist orientation of Yugoslav Marxist historiography and archaeology.

It contradicted the official viewpoint by the communist party ideologue, Serb Milovan Djilas (1945–1947), that the Montenegrins were an ethnic group within the Serb nation, and only in 1878 formed their nationality due to social-capitalism; he denied that the Montenegrins were a separate ethnic group and nationality. Kulišić's work was criticized for various misinterpretations including of historical sources, and immediately followed a public panel in 1981, all in the intention of discrediting.

== Legacy ==
Over the years Špiro Kulišić's book has become the conceiving cradle of the Montenegrins sovereignty, centered on the establishment of a distinct Montenegrin language, a Montenegrin Orthodox Church and Montenegro's independence from its common state with Serbia in 2006, a view of history promoted throughout the 1990s by the Doclean Academy of Sciences and Arts. Since Montenegro's independence from Serbia and Montenegro and the other political changes of the 21st century, Kulišić's works and their continuations of members of his school have received a considerable growth and some popularity with the public.

== Works ==
- "Porijeklo i značenje božićnog obrednog hljeba u Južnih Slovena". Bulletin du Musée de la République Populaire de Bosnie et Hercégovine à Sarajevo. Državna štamparija. 1953. pp. 9–.
- "O postanku slovenske zadruge" [On the Origin of the Slavic Zadruga]. Bilten Instituta za proučavanje folklora u Sarajevu. Vol. 3. 1955. pp. 43–56.
- "Tragovi arhaične porodice u svadbenim običajima Crne Gore i Boke Kotorske". Bulletin du Musée de la République Populaire de Bosnie et Herzegovine à Sarajevo: Histoire et ethnographie. Štamparski zavod "Veselin Masleša". 1956.
- Arhaično bratstvo u Crnoj Gori i Hercegovini (1957)
- Matrilokalni brak i materinska filijacija u narodnim običajima Bosne, Hercegovine i Dalmacije (1958)
- Etnološko-folkloristička ispitivanja u Neumu i okolini (1959)
- — (1960). Život i kultura zaostalih plemena Australije, Okeanije, Amerike i Afrike. Veselin Masleša.
- — (1963). Tragovi arhaične organizacije i pitanje balkansko-slovenske simbioze u razvoju našeg dinarskog rodovskog društva. Etnološko društvo Jugoslavije.
- — (1966). Traditions and Folklore in Yugoslavia. Jugoslavija.
- —; Miodrag Maksimović (1968). Neobični običaji raznih naroda svijeta. Vuk Karadžić.
- Iz stare srpske religije: novogodišnji običaji (1970)
- with P. Ž. Petrović and N. Pantelić wrote Srpski mitološki rječnik (1970)
- — (1979). Stara slovenska religija u svjetlu novijih istraživanja posebno balkanoloških. Akademija nauka i umjetnosti Bosne i Hercegovine.
- — (1980). O etnogenezi Crnogoraca. Pobjeda.
- With P. Ž. Petrović and N. Pantelić contributed to Kulturna istorija Bosne i Hercegovine od najstarijih vremena do pada ovih zemalja pod Osmansku vlast (1984)
