= Mugoše =

Historical tribe of Montenegro

Mugoše (Montenegrin Cyrillic: Мугоше, Albanian: Mugosha, also spelled Magushi, Moguši) was a historical tribe (pleme) of Albanian origin and area in the Brda region of Montenegro. Mugoše were located around the region of Piperi. Toponyms related to them can be found in many parts of the region, such as Mugošina Livada in Komani.

== Etymology ==
Mugoše were originally an Albanian tribe.

== History ==
The Mugoše may have been immigrants from present-day Albania who settled in the Brda region around the 12th and 13th centuries.

While not considered as a tribe anymore, some Montenegrins bear the Mugoša surname. During World War II, many of them joined the Yugoslav Partisans. According to 2006 data, 779 people had the surname in Podgorica; people with the surname are represented above average in local politics service in the capital.

== Notable people ==
- Stefan Mugoša (born 1992), Montenegrin footballer
- Miomir Mugoša (born 1950), Montenegrin physician and politician
- Svetlana Mugoša-Antić (born 1964), former Yugoslav handball player
- Marko Mugoša (basketball) (born 1993), Montenegrin basketball player
- Marko Mugoša (born 1984) former Montenegrin footballer
- Ljiljana Mugoša (born 1962), former Yugoslav handball player
- Dijana Mugoša (born 1995), Montenegrin handball player
- Dušan Mugoša (1914-1973), Yugoslav partisan
- Špiro Mugoša (1904-1942), Yugoslav partisan

== See also ==
- Špiro Mugoša Airport
