= Zagreda =

Zagreda Загреда
- Village
- Location within Montenegro
- Coordinates: 42.541350°N 19.072036°E
- Country: Montenegro
- Municipality: Danilovgrad

Population (2011)
  - Total: 228
- Time zone: UTC+1 (CET)
  - Summer (DST): UTC+2 (CEST)

Zagreda (Serbian Cyrillic: Загреда) is a village in the municipality of Danilovgrad, Montenegro.

== Demographics ==
According to the 2011 census, its population was 228.

Ethnicity in 2011
Ethnicity	Number	Percentage
Montenegrins	211	92.5%
Serbs	16	7.0%
other/undeclared	1	0.4%
Total	228	100%
