= Bukumiri =

Bukumiri (alternatively, Bukmiri) was an Albanian tribe (fis) that lived in present-day central and south-eastern Montenegro. They were semi-nomadic pastoralists whose social organization was based on kinship around brotherhoods of common patrilineal ancestry. Over time they began to settle permanently and in the 15th and 16th centuries they formed their own settlements mostly in Montenegro, but a few branches also in northern Albania. In later years, branches of Bukumiri are also found in Sandžak and Kosovo.

== Name ==
The name is a compound of the Albanian words bukë (bread) and mirë (good). Their name has been interpreted figuratively as an indication of their wealth. Today, in Montenegro their historical presence has been preserved in the toponym of Bukumirsko jezero (Bukumir lake) on Mt. Komovi, the location Bukmira (Ulcinj municipality) and the surnames Bukumirić, Bukumirović and Bukumira or Bukumire. In Albania, it is preserved in the toponyms of Bukëmirë in Rrëshen and Bukmirë in Bruçaj (Pult).

== History ==
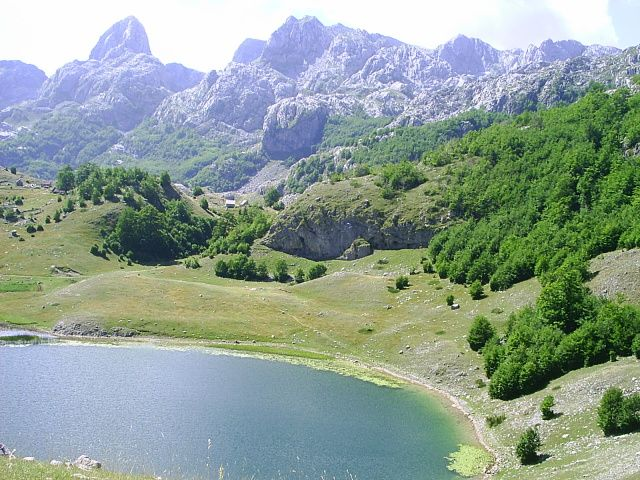
Bukumirsko jezero in Montenegro

The Bukmiri were semi-nomadic pastoralists that lived in non-permanent settlements. In the summer months, they moved with their herds in the pasturelands of present-day Montenegro and in the winter months, they camped in the plain of Shkodër. Over time they settled in villages and settlements. In the local Venetian cadaster of 1416-7, some are found in settlements around the city of Shkodra. They were Catholic. One of them, the priest Gjon Bukëmiri, who lived in Drisht, joined the monastery of Trogir in 1340 and died there in 1345. Another one, Fra Nikaç is found in the katun Bukmir in the Piperi region in 1497.

In the late 15th century, a large part of Bukmiri ended their semi-nomadic pastoral movement and settled in the region of Piperi - also included Bratonožići - where they appear as katun Bukmir with 43 households. A century later, in 1582 their settlement had become permanent and was recorded as a village. In time, it was absorbed in the Piperi and Bratonožići that were being formed at the time. Also, in 1485 in Mrkojevići, a Nuliç, son of Bukmir is found. He was one of the Albanians that appear as part of pravi Mrkojevići, the original community that formed the nucleus of that tribe. The Bukmiri of Piperi and Bratonožići eventually also became Orthodox. In the 18th century, some of these Orthodox brotherhoods of Bukmiri also settled in the historical Bihor region, in Berane and Petnjica. In Bihor, many converted to Islam and today there are families in the region that trace their origin to this tribe.

Other branches moved southwards and settled within modern Albania. In 1485 a village formed by them appears in the Dukagjin highlands as a derbendci community. Other groups created Bukëmirë in Rrëshen and Bukmirë in Bruçaj (Pult). Bukmirë of Pult is grouped with another village, Dajç in 1671 by bishop Shtjefën Gaspari. In his account, they had 10 households and 73 inhabitants.

Stories and folk legends about the Bukmiri have been preserved in the traditions of Montenegrin tribes, especially those of Vasojevići. One of those involves the naming of Bukumirsko jezero, which according to the myth was named after Bukumiri villagers who were drowned in the lake by demons (anatemnjaći). Another folk story in Bratonožići recounts that because the Bukmiri of the area were of lower status than them, they did not want to intermarry with women from that tribe. There is also a legend about their origins that links them together with Mataruge and Kriči to the Španji tribe.

Other traditions about them are historically-grounded. One of those is a story about the Bukumiri of Sandžak, an Orthodox Albanian brotherhood that were defeated and lost their lands by the grandfather of Ali Pasha of Gusinje, the foremost Ottoman landowner of Plav-Gusinje-Bihor in the 18th century.
