= Mataguži =

Mataguži Матагужи
- Village
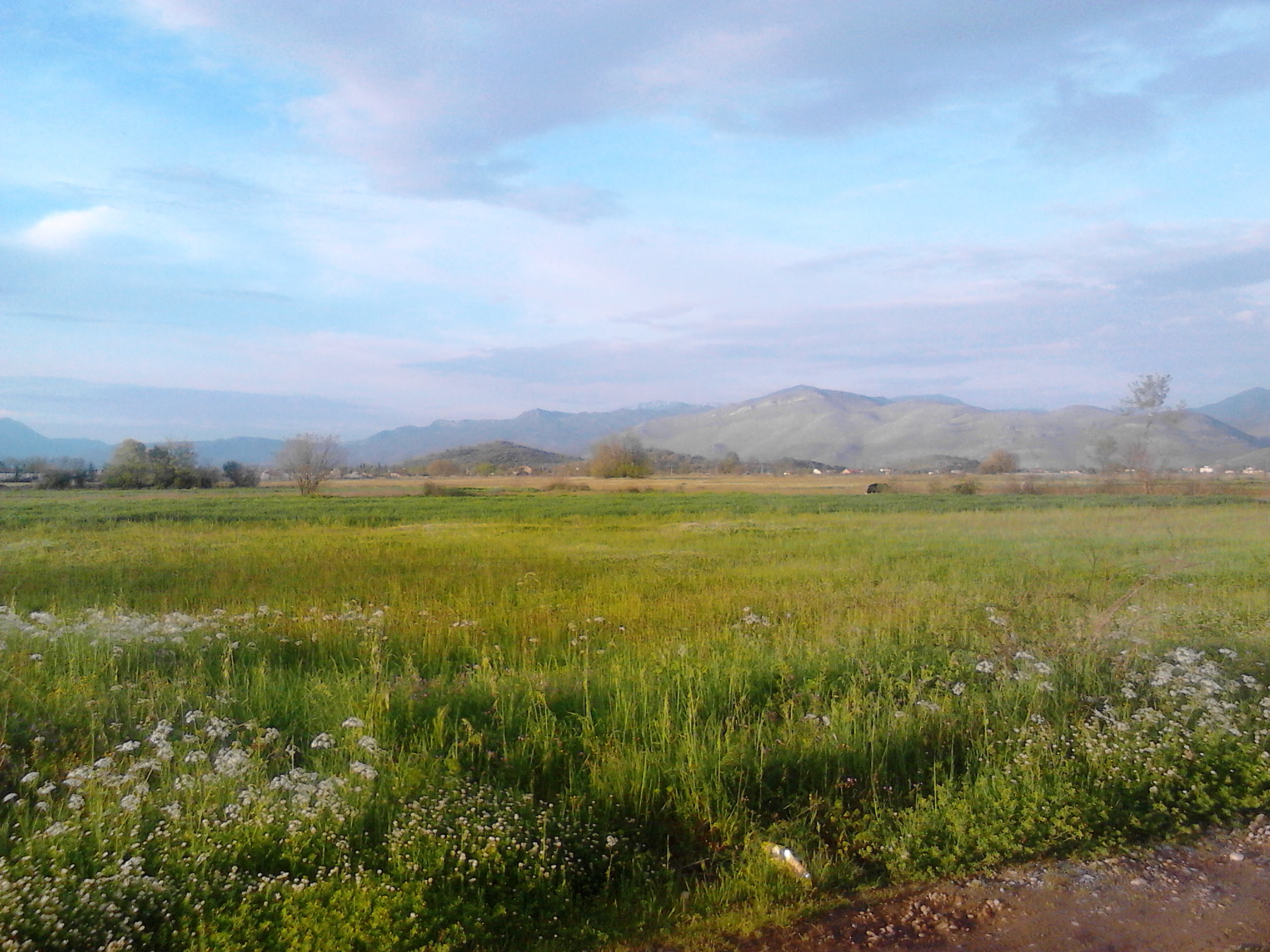

- Location within Montenegro
- Coordinates: 42°19′15″N 19°16′13″E
- Country: Montenegro
- Municipality: Podgorica

Population (2011)
  - Total: 1,292
- Time zone: UTC+1 (CET)
  - Summer (DST): UTC+2 (CEST)

Mataguži (Montenegrin: Матагужи, pronounced [mâtaɡuʒi]) is a village in the new Zeta Municipality of Montenegro. Until 2022, it was part of Podgorica Municipality.

Mataguži is located in the Upper Zeta region, just north of Lake Skadar. It is named after the medieval Mataguzi tribe that lived in the region and founded the original settlement.

== Demographics ==
According to the 2003 census, the village had a population of 1,299 people.

According to the 2011 census, its population was 1,292.

Ethnicity in 2011
Ethnicity	Number	Percentage
Montenegrins	767	59.4%
Serbs	436	33.7%
Albanians	9	0.7%
other/undeclared	80	6.2%
Total	1,292	100%

== History ==
In 1880, Montenegrin forces attacked the Albanian villages of Gostil and Mataguži, massacring civilians including women and children. Prince Nikola I Petrović-Njegoš denied prior knowledge of the atrocities. Later that year, Albanian fighters repelled a Montenegrin attack near Mataguži on 28 July, inflicting heavy losses and driving the invaders back across the border. During the fighting, Gostil was burned to the ground.
