= Spanić =

Spanić is a surname, originating as a branch of the Albanian Spani family.

Notable people with the surname include:

- Daniela Spanic (born 1973), Venezuelan model and actress, twin sister of Gabriela
- Gabriela Spanic (born 1973), Venezuelan actress, twin sister of Daniela
- Nikola Spanić (1633–1707), Croatian Roman Catholic bishop

== See also ==
- Spanović
- Spani family
