= Mataguzi (tribe) =

Albanian tribe based in southern Montenegro

Mataguzi (alternatively, Matagushi or Mataguzhi, Montenegrin: Mataguži, Albanian: Matagushi) was an Albanian tribe in the Middle Ages in southern Montenegro, on the northern shores of Lake Skadar. Their area of settlement included the modern village of Mataguži which takes its name from the tribe.

== History ==
They appear in historical record for the first time in 1330 in the Dečani chrysobulls as part of the Albanian (arbanas) katun (pastoral community) of Llesh Tuzi, in an area stretching southwards from modern Tuzi Municipality along the Lake Skadar to a village near modern Koplik. This katund included many communities that later formed their own separate communities: Matagushi and his brothers, Reçi and his sons, Bushati and his sons, Pjetër Suma (ancestor of Gruda) and Pjetër Kuçi, first known ancestor of Kuči.

About a century later, the Mataguzi were nominally vassals of Balša III. Their lands bordered those of Hoti with whom they were in dispute over pasture lands in the 1410s. Balša passed judgment against Hoti in the dispute with the Mataguzi, but despite his support to them, Hoti took over the disputed lands. Mataguzi retaliated by killing four Hoti tribesmen. As Balša III again sided with Mataguži and did not call for punishment for the killings, Hoti switched fealty to Venice in return for their support in 1416. People from this tribe appear twice in the Venetian cadaster of Scutari in 1416-7. One Lazër Matagulshi lived in the village of Grizhë, south of Koplik and an Andrea Matagulshi lived south of Gjadër in the village of Kakarriq. In 1455, they appear as one of the communities that swore fealty to Venice in an assembly on the island of Vranjina. The assembly was organized by Venetian vassal Stefan Crnojević to whom their settlement, the modern village of Mataguzi paid taxes. The subject of the assembly was the re-affirmation of allegiance to Venice in the face of Ottoman expansion.

The Mataguzi were a Christian Orthodox community. In 1468, their leaders donated to the Vranjina Monastery a land area between Rijeka Plavnica and Karabež on the shores of Lake Skadar. The village of Mataguži is named after them. As the lake expanded and land was lost to the increasing level of water they had to relocate to the modern settlement. Today, the families of the Grbavčević brotherhood (bratstvo) in the village may be descended from them.
