= Vranjina Monastery =

Serbian Orthodox monastery on Skadar Lake, Montenegro

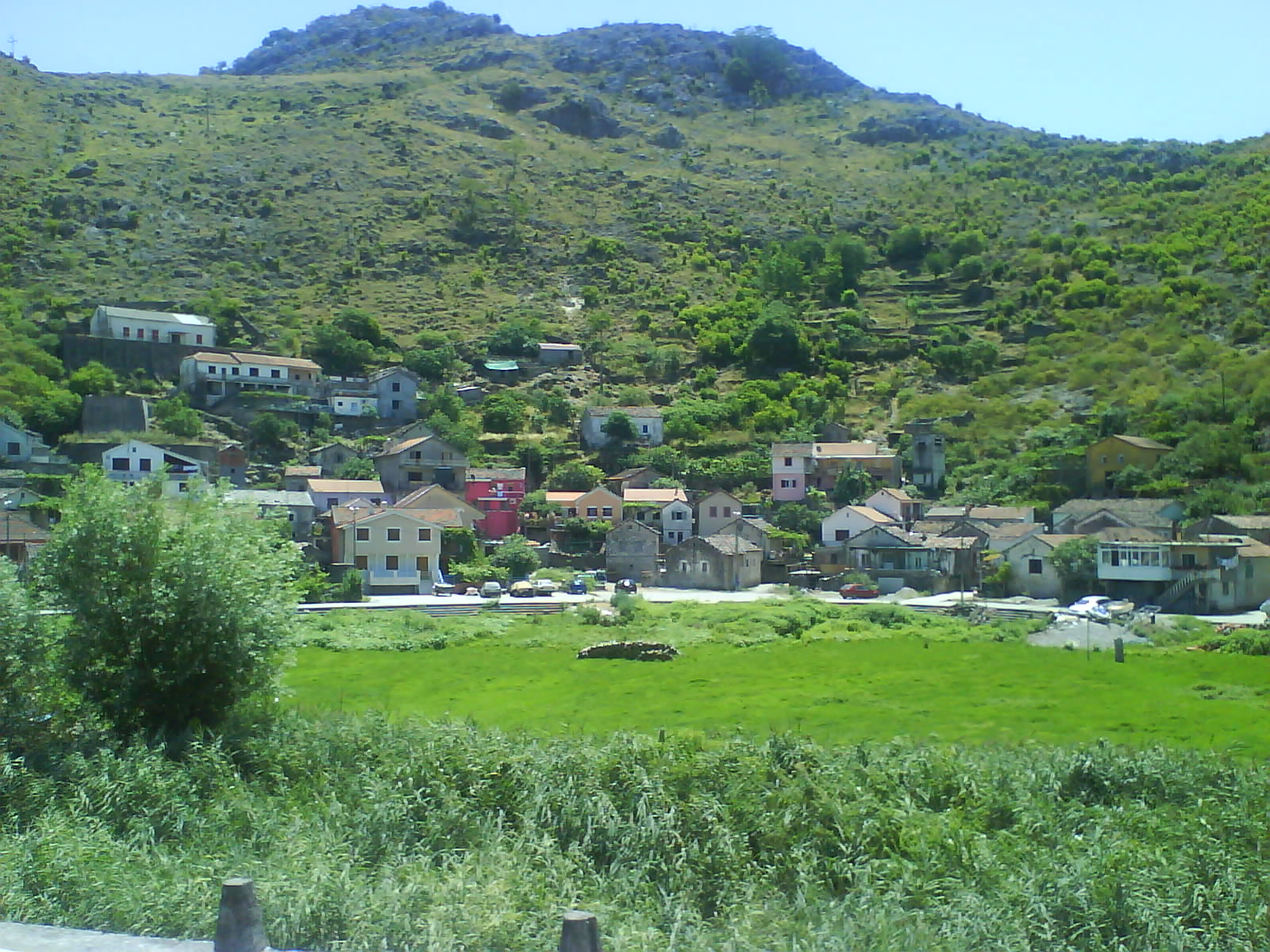

- Location within Montenegro

Religion
- Affiliation: Serbian Orthodox Church
- Rite: Eastern Orthodoxy

Location
- Location: Vranjina island on Skadar Lake
- Territory: Metropolitanate of Montenegro and the Littoral
- Coordinates: 42.2706°N 19.1450°E

Architecture
- Founder: Saint Sava or Ilarion
- Completed: 1221–1232

The Vranjina Monastery (Serbian: Манастир Врањина, romanized: Manastir Vranjina), also known as the Monastery of St. Nicholas, is a Serbian Orthodox monastery on the Vranjina island in Skadar Lake in Montenegro. The Vranjina monastery with its church dedicated to Saint Nicholas was one of the oldest monasteries in Montenegro, but it was completely destroyed in attacks during the 19th century. It was rebuilt in 1886.

== Geography ==
The monastery is located on the south-eastern part of the Vranjina island on Skadar Lake in south Montenegro.

== History ==
The Vranjina monastery with its church dedicated to Saint Nicholas is one of the oldest monasteries in Montenegro. The monastery was first mentioned in the 1232/33 founding charter of Archbishop Sava Nemanjić (s. 1219–1233), the first primate of the autocephalous Serbian Church. It was founded by Sava himself, or, according to tradition, his disciple and bishop Ilarion, the first bishop of Zeta who was also buried here. It was built after 1221 on the foundation ruins of a Byzantine church dated to the 6th century. It was specially designated a church under the direct authority of the Serbian archbishop, and not the bishop of Zeta.

The monastic metochion was initially formed by land and income granted to the monastery by members of the Nemanjić dynasty, who gave the richest donations to the monastery. Archsbishop Sava granted some land of the Holy Savior metochion on Plavnica to Vranjina, while King Stefan Vladislav granted the Crmnica villages of Godinje, Medveđa Glava and Kruševica to the monastery, and queen Helen of Anjou granted it land around Krnjica and Uljanik in Kruševica in 1280. Around 1296 King Stefan Milutin granted the village of Orahovo and 100 perpers of income from the Sveti Srdj market near Skadar to the monastery. In 1348, Emperor Stefan Dušan awarded the monastery together with half of its income to the church in Jerusalem dedicated to Archangel Michael (believed to be founded by King Milutin). That way Vranjina became a metochion of the Church of Archangel Michael in Jerusalem.

Vranjina was later granted with rich estates by members of the Balšić and Crnojević noble families who ruled Zeta. In 1404 Đurađ Stracimirović donated the village of Rake to the monastery while Balša III donated it a salt pond (1417) and the village of Karuč in Crmnica (1420). In the period after Nemanjić rule, during which all estates belonged to the supreme monarch, minor local nobility began to lay ownership claims to the land, some even taking over parts of monastic metochions. On 6 September 1455 Zetan ruler Stefan Crnojević organized an assembly at the monastery amidst the growing Ottoman threat, with the higland tribes swearing allegiance to the Venetian republic in the presence of the provveditore. In church matters, the assembly was pivotal for the persistence of authority of the Metropolitanate of Zeta which at the time rivaled the uncanonical and, in accordance with Venetian politics following the Council of Florence, Venetian-installed Greek Uniate metropolitan seated at the Ostros monastery. The assembly officially requested that their metropolitan be a Slav and that Vranjina be recognised as the official seat. In 1468, the prohegumen of Vranjina was Nikon Jerusalimac, the former spiritual guide of princess Jelena Lazarević (1365–1443), the daughter of Prince Lazar of Serbia and wife of Đurađ Stracimirović. In 1469 Ivan Crnojević returned all of Vranjina's former estates which included villages in Zeta valley, Limljani, Limsko Polje, Brčeli, Optočići, Tomići and Šišovići. In 1478, during the Siege of Shkodra, sultan Mehmed the Conqueror confirmed all existing rights and privileges to the monastery in order to gain support from the surrounding tribes.

The monastery was a temporary seat of the Metropolitanate of Zeta after the destruction of the Holy Archangel Michael monastery in 1441 and remained so until 1481 when, because of the vicinity of the frontlines, the seat was briefly moved to the Kom Monastery. Finally, Ivan Crnojević moved it to Cetinje in 1485. In the beginning of the 16th century the pressure on its properties was renewed, this time by the neighboring villages, so the monastery had to plead to Skenderbeg Crnojević for the protection of its rights in 1527. The monastery was so poor in the 17th century that in 1665 its hegumen, together with hegumen of Moračnik Monastery, requested help from the Catholic bishop of Scutari Pjetër Bogdani. It was set on fire by Ottoman forces in 1714 during Numan Pasha's invasion of Montenegro. The nine defenders of the monastery, including its hegumen Nikolaj from Podgori and vojvoda Ratko Orlandić who were badly outnumbered, fortified themselves in the monastery and were burned alive.

In 1843 Osman Pasha Skopljak made an incursion and took over the islands of Vranjina and Lesendro. The monastery was destroyed in the 1843 attack, and the ruins were then completely destroyed in 1862.

In 1886, Prince Nicholas had the church rebuilt at its ruins with help from the Russian emperor Alexander III. The church lodge burnt down in the early 1970s and a smaller lodge was built in 1998 by Metropolitan Amfilohije. In 2010 reconstruction of the larger lodge began. Today the monastery is composed out of one church, one larger and one smaller lodge.

== Architecture ==
Church dedicated to the translation of St. Nicholas' relics is original church, completely destroyed in 19th century. and rebuilt by Prince Nicholas in 1886. Church likely dedicated to the Theotokos is 13th-century church located below and to the northwest of St. Nicholas. Completely destroyed in 19th century. Church dedicated to Saint Sava, built in the 14th century located on a hill to the west of St. Nicholas, includes monastic graveyard. Completely destroyed in 19th century.

== See also ==
- List of Serbian monasteries

== Sources ==
- Bubalo, Đ. (2006). "Средњовековни архив манастира Врањине (прилог реконструкцији)". Стари српски архив. 5: 243–276.
- Džomić, Velibor V. (2006). Pravoslavlje u Crnoj Gori. Svetigora. ISBN 9788676600311. "По предању, основао га је Свети Сава, или пак први Зетски Епископ Иларион, Савин ученик (који је овдје и сахрањен)."
- Jovićević, Andrija P. (2011) [1930—1939]. Drevni srpski Manastiri [Ancient Serbian monasteries] (in Serbian). Nikšić: Izdavački centar Matice srpske – Društva članova u Crnoj Gori. ISBN 978-9940-580-05-6.
- Markuš, Jovan B. (2016). "Обнова манастира и цркава у Црној Гори у вријеме Митрополита Амфилохија (14) – Манастир Врањина". Православна Митрополија црногорско-приморска.
- Sava (1996). Srpski jerarsi: od devetog do dvadesetog veka. Evro. p. 193.
- Simić, Pribislav (1994). Crkvena umetnost: pregled razvoja graditeljstva i živopisa. Sv. arhijerejski sinod Srpske pravoslavne crkve. p. 326.
- Vujošević, Žarko (2017). "Врањина и Св. Арханђели у Јерусалиму–Још један осврт на традицију даровне повеље цара Стефана Душана". Историјски часопис. 66: 237–255.
- Vujošević, Žarko (2023). "Povelja prestolonaslednika Stefana Uroša (Dečanskog) manastiru Vranjini". Inicijal. Časopis za srednjovekovne studije. 11: 191–213.
