= Zeta (river) =

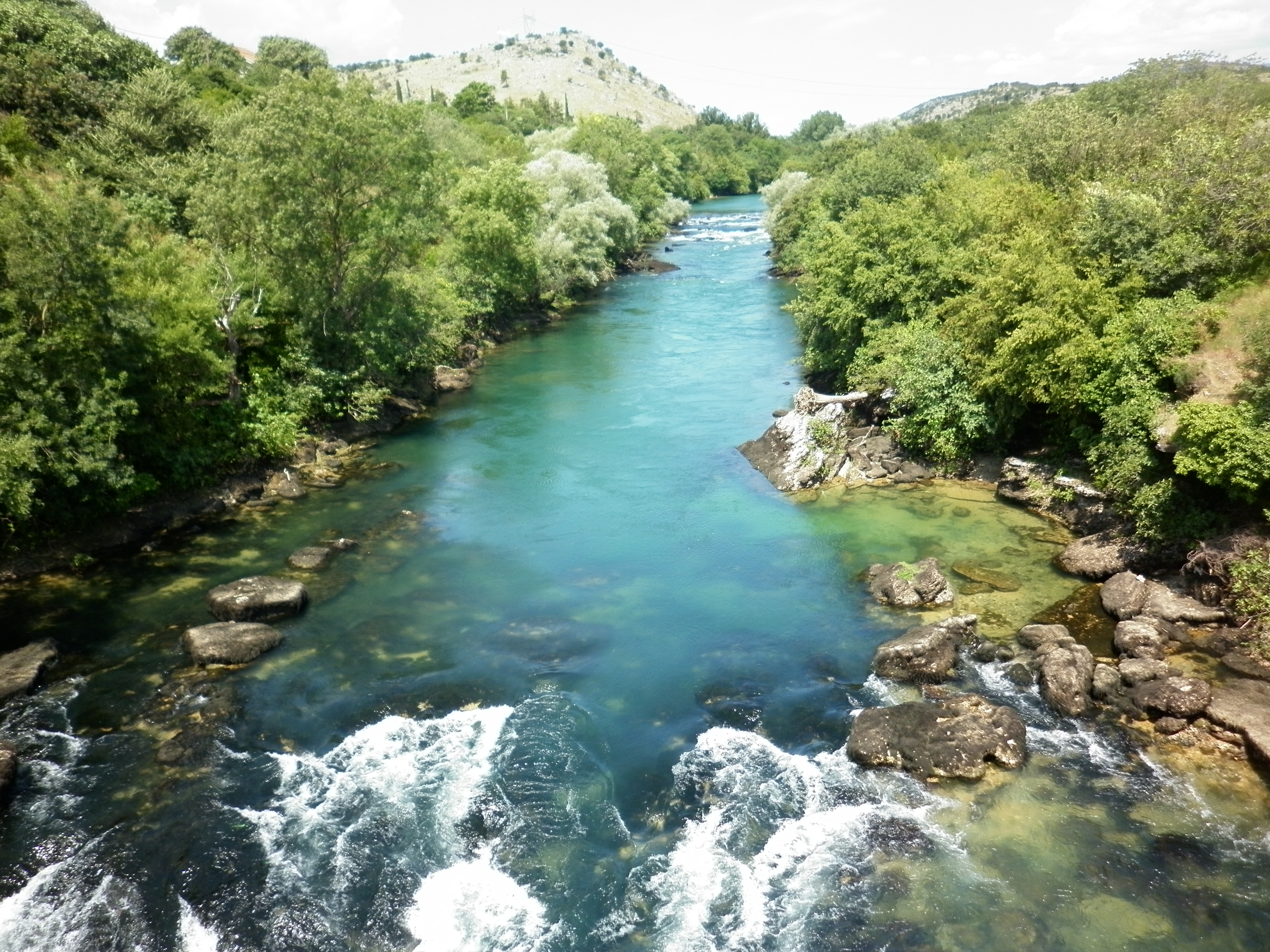

Location
- Country: Montenegro

Physical characteristics
- Mouth
  - location: Morača
  - coordinates: 42°27′52″N 19°15′40″E
- Length: 65 km (40 mi)
- Basin size: 1,597 km^{2} (617 sq mi)

Basin features
- Progression: Morača→ Lake Skadar→ Bojana→ Adriatic Sea

The Zeta (Montenegrin Cyrillic: Зета, pronounced [zêta]) is a river in Montenegro.

Its source is under the mountain of Vojnik. The river flows eastwards for 65 km (40 mi) until it empties into the river Morača just north of Podgorica. Its drainage basin area is 1,597 km^{2} (617 sq mi).

== Geography ==
One theory is that the name "Zeta" derives from an early Greek "Zenta", later romanized in "Senta".

The Zeta River is the most significant tributary of the Morača river. The Perućica hydroelectric power plant near Nikšić (307 MW, 970 GWh) uses the waters of the Zeta River to generate power. After that, the river meanders through the Bjelopavlići Valley and Danilovgrad Municipality, until it empties into the Morača a few miles north of Capital City of Podgorica.

Historical monumental Carev Most (the Tsar's Bridge) exists over Zeta to the south of Nikšić town, and the ancient castle of Pandurica is situated nearby.
