= Greeks in the United Kingdom =

Total population
- Greek-born residents in the United Kingdom: 86,948 (2021/22 Census) (Note: Does not include ethnic Greeks born in the United Kingdom or those with Greek ancestry); England: 78,283 (2021); Scotland: 6,294 (2022); Wales: 1,839 (2021); Northern Ireland: 532 (2021); Previous estimates: 35,169 (2001 Census); 57,000 (2015 ONS estimate); Ethnic Greeks; 400,000 (2008 estimate)

Regions with significant populations
- London; Birmingham; Sheffield; Liverpool; Manchester; Glasgow; Cardiff

Languages
- British English, Greek

Religion
- Predominantly Greek Orthodox and Anglican; Minority Protestant, Catholic, Islam, Hellenic Polytheism, Jewish

Greeks in the United Kingdom (Greek: Έλληνες στο Ηνωμένο Βασίλειο, romanized: Éllines sto Inoméno Vasíleio), also known as Greek Britons, are British residents and citizens of full or partial Greek heritage, or Greeks who emigrated to and reside in the United Kingdom.

== History ==
=== Early Greek contact ===
==== Mycenaean Greeks ====
The Mycenaean civilization was an early Greek civilization which flourished during the period between 1600 BC, when Helladic culture in mainland Greece was transformed under influences from Minoan Crete, and 1100 BC, when it perished with the collapse of Bronze-Age civilization in the eastern Mediterranean. Through trading and conquest, Mycenaean civilization spread its influence from Mycenae to many parts of the Mediterranean region and Europe. Mycenaean bronze double axes and other objects (Rillaton Barrow, Pelynt Dagger) dating from the thirteenth century BC have been found in Ireland and in Wessex and Cornwall in England, proving at least indirect Greek contact with Ireland and Great Britain at the time.

==== Cassiterides ====
Ancient Greek writers, including Herodotus, mention a group of islands which were called Cassiterides. Modern researchers suggest that they may refer to the British Isles.

==== Aristotle ====
Aristotle, in the work On the Universe, mentions the Britannic islands (βρεττανικαί νήσοι), two islands which were called Albion (Ἀλβίων), which is the modern Great Britain, and Ierne (Ἰέρνη), which is the modern Ireland.

==== Pytheas ====
The first known Greek to come to Britain was Pytheas who lived in late 4th and early 3rd centuries BC. He reported its name as Prettanike (Πρεττανική) and Brettaniai (Βρεττανίαι), for Britain and the British islands, which became Britannia, it is assumed that its Hellenised version was under Diodorus. It may have been used by some of the local peoples where Pytheas landed to themselves -Pretani.

=== Roman period ===
Many Greeks later arrived with the Roman legions as soldiers and traders, and their presence is attested by inscriptions on curse tablets, gravestones and dedicatory tablets in both Greek and Latin displayed in the Museum of London and elsewhere, including:

A ALFID POMP OLVSSA EX TESTAMENTO HER POS ANNOR LXX NA ATHENVI H S EST
"Aulus Alfidius Pompolussa, as stated in his will, his heirs placed this. Seventy years old, a native of Athens, he lies here."

and:

I O M TEMPLVM VETVSTATE CONLABSVM AQVILINVS AVG LIB ET MERCATOR ET AVDAX ET GRAEC RESTITVER
"For Jupiter Best and Greatest, this temple, collapsed through old age, was restored by Aquilinus, freedman of the emperor, a trader, a man of courage, a Greek."

and two dedicatory plaques found in York beneath what is now the railway station. These were erected by a certain Scribonius Demetrius, possibly to be identified with Demetrius of Tarsus, who visited Britain at the time of Gnaeus Julius Agricola:

ΩΚΕΑΝῼ ΚΑΙ ΤΗΘΥΙ ΔΗΜΗΤΡΙΟΣ
"To Oceanus and Tethys, Demetrius [dedicates this]."

and

ΘΕΟΙΣ
ΤΟΙΣ ΤΟΥ ΗΓΕ
ΜΟΝΙΚΟΥ ΠΡΑΙ
ΤΩΡΙΟΥ ΣΚΡΙΒ. ΔΗ[Μ]ΗΤΡΙΟΣ
"To the gods of the governor's headquarters, Scribonius Demetrius [dedicates this]."

As far north as Cumbria, we find the tomb of Hermes of Commagene:

"Let some traveller, on seeing Hermes of Commagene, aged 16 years, sheltered in the tomb by fate, call out: I give you my greetings, lad, though mortal the path of life you slowly tread, for swiftly have you winged your way to the land of the Cimmerian folk. Nor will your words be false, for the lad is good, and you will do him a good service."

Indeed, the Roman city of Carlisle, judging by surviving inscriptions, seems to have been home to a thriving Greek community. It is a matter of historical record then, that Greek was being spoken in England hundreds of years before the English language or Anglo-Saxon peoples ever reached its shores.

=== Middle ages ===
==== Early Middle Ages ====
In the 7th century, following the death of the previous holder of the post, the Greek Theodore of Tarsus was appointed Archbishop of Canterbury (669 AD); he played an important part in the early history of England, building churches and monasteries and establishing theological studies. According to the Venerable Bede, Theodore contributed to the bringing of a greater unity to English Christianity, and in 672 presided over the first council of the entire English Church, at Hertford. The structure of dioceses and parishes he put in place is still substantially in place today.

==== Late Middle Ages ====
The Byzantine ruler Manuel II visited England in 1400, where he was received by Henry IV at Eltham Palace.

A Greek presence in London was recorded with the two brothers, Andronikos and Alexios Effomatos – described in contemporary records as "Grekes" – who were known to have been resident in London in 1440. They were from Constantinople, the capital of Byzantium.

In 1445, the king of England, Henry VI (1421–1471), granted the brothers permission to remain in London and to practise their trade of gold wire drawing. They made a costly type of thread in which thin strands of gold were intertwined with silk, and which was then used in expensive luxury fabrics and in sacerdotal vestments, a craft for which Constantinople had been famous in its heyday. Thanks to this royal grant, the brothers remained in London for many years. They lived first in the area of Cripplegate, much of which is now covered by the Barbican Centre, and later they moved to Broad Street, in what was then the Italian quarter of London. Andronikos, the elder, died in about 1472, but Alexios was still there in 1484, over forty years after his first arrival.

That set the pattern for Greek settlement over the next two hundred years. Some came as soldiers during the reign of Henry VIII, led by the officers Theodore Luchisi, Antonios Stesinos, and Colonel Thomas of Argos, responsible for the garrisoning of the then-English possession of Calais. Some came as visitors for a short period. In about 1545, Nikandros Noukios of Corfu spent time in London and left an interesting account of his impressions. Indeed, he followed as a non-combatant an English invasion of Scotland where the English forces included Greeks from Argos under the leadership of Thomas of Argos whose 'Courage, and prudence, and experience of wars' was lauded by the Corfiot traveller. (Note: J.A. Cramer notes in his introduction to N. Nucius translation that he used an original that was mutilated and had several pages torn out. On p. 95 the narrative stops exactly where the text starts referring to Thomas of Argos (see also his note in p. 115). A Greek historian, Andreas Moustoxydis, published the missing part of the original Greek text, based on a Nucius' manuscript (catalogued as D.72) found in the Ambrosian Library (Milan), mentioned also by Cramer. After Cramer's asterisks (end of his translation) the text continues as follows: [Hence, indeed, Thomas also, the general of the Argives from Peloponnesus, with those about him ***] spoke to them these words: "Comrades, as you see we are in the extreme parts of the world, under the service of a King and a nation in the farthest north. And nothing we brought here from our country other than our courage and bravery. Thus, bravely we stand against our enemies, because their numbers is nothing in front of our virtue. Because we are children of the Greeks(*) and we are not afraid of the barbarian flock. …. Therefore, courageous and in order let us march to the enemy, and the shore of the ocean we paint red with blood, and the famous since olden times virtue of the Greeks(*) let us prove with our action." (*) Έλληνες in the original Greek text. This incident happened during the Sieges of Boulogne (1544–1546).) Thomas was sent by Henry VIII to Boulogne in 1546, as commander of a battalion of 550 Greeks.

During Henry VIII's reign more Greeks migrated to England from the island of Rhodes following the Knights Hospitaller, after the island was conquered by the Ottomans. A notable Rhodian was the merchant Franciscos Galiardis.

=== 17th century ===
The descendants of the imperial Palaeologus dynasty carved out a niche as mercenary officers in Britain, and their tombs are still visible in locations as far apart – both geographically and in terms of social standing – as Westminster Abbey and Landulph parish church, Cornwall. A number of Palaeologi fought against each other as high-ranking officers for both sides in the English Civil War.

Early Modern Greco-Britons were not solely soldiers. A few individuals settled permanently, such as a native of Rhodes called Konstantinos Benetos, who was recorded as living in Clerkenwell between 1530 and 1578. These visitors, refugees and occasional long-term residents did not, as yet, constitute a community. They were too few, too obscure and too transitory, and above all they lacked the one thing that would have given them cohesion and a common identity: a church where they could practise their Orthodox faith. Nikodemos Metaxas, a printer by trade, worked in London for a time in the 1620s. Some came as refugees, seeking asylum or financial help as a result of misfortunes suffered under Ottoman rule. One of them was Gregorios Argyropoulos, the owner of an estate near Thessaloniki. When a Turkish soldier was accidentally killed on Argyropoulos' land, the Ottoman authorities held him responsible and forced him to flee overseas and eventually to London in 1633. A charitable collection was made for him in London churches, and he was presented with £48 before he departed the following year.

By the late 17th century, matters had changed. A number of Greeks now occupied prominent positions in London life. Constantinos Rodocanachi of Chios had become one of the physicians to King Charles II (163 I -I 685) (PI. 1). Georgios Constantinos of Skopelos had established the Grecian coffeehouse in Devereux court, just off the Strand, and he could count Sir Isaac Newton and other members of the Royal Society among his clientele. Numbers had also increased. The expansion of Britain's overseas trade with the Levant brought many more merchant ships to the port of London, some of them crewed by Greeks. The time was therefore ripe to press for the establishment of a Greek Church.

In 1676 about one hundred families from the islands of Samos and Melos under the bishop Joseph Georgarinis migrated to England. Assisted by Konstantinos Rhodokanakis they were welcomed by the then Duke of York who later became King James II. They were granted settlements in Crown Str, Soho, later renamed to "Greek Str.".

The first documented organised Greek Orthodox community was established in London in the 1670s, with the first Greek Orthodox Church in London being erected in 1677, in Soho, on the corner of Charing Cross Road and Greek Street. The church was dedicated to the Dormition of the Virgin and was consecrated by the Metropolitan of Samos, Joseph Georgerinis. The founding inscription of the church (dated 1677), among others mentions that the church "was founded for the nation of the Greeks, in the reign of Most Serene King Jacob II".

Oxford also became home to a Greek community centred on what is now Worcester College, which was known as 'Greek College' for much of the 17th century. The Greek College was founded by Lord Paget, then ambassador to Constantinople, though recruitment of Greek students was halted in 1705 because " 'the irregular life of some priests and laymen of the Greek Church living in London has greatly disturbed the Greek Orthodox Church. Therefore the Church has also prevented those who wish to go and study at Oxford.'"

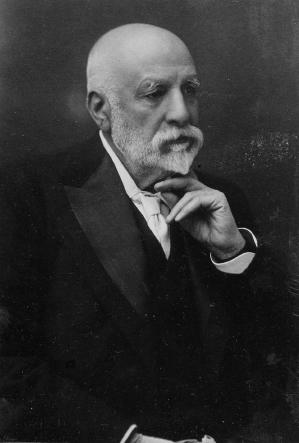
Alexander Constantine Ionides (1810–1890) renowned art patron of the 19th century who was Greek Consul General and Director of the Crystal Palace Company, London.

=== 19th century to present ===
In the 19th century, two events drew Greeks towards Britain; commercial potential after the defeat of Napoleon, and the Diaspora, in which the Greek War of Independence saw a wave of emigres settle in Britain. Initially trading in shipping and commodities, most of these families were from Chios and Constantinople, and settled around Finsbury Circus in London, close to the commercial heart of the shipping industry; the Baltic Exchange and Lloyd's of London. Others settled in the commercial cities of Liverpool and Manchester, and later Glasgow and Cardiff. They were joined by other Greeks from the Aegean, Ionan, Smyrna, Athens and beyond. As they prospered these Greek merchants began to settle in London's Bayswater and established permanent institutions such as the Greek necropolis at Norwood in 1842, a Greek school and the Greek Orthodox church, later Cathedral of Aghia Sophia in 1877.

Britain gained control over Cyprus on 4 June 1878 as a result of the Cyprus Convention and formally annexed it in 1914. Greek Cypriots began to settle in London only from the 1930s. The earliest migrants came to the area around Soho, and many more arrived at the end of the Second World War. As rents in the West End increased, Camden and Fulham became popular areas for Greek-Cypriot migrants. Women initially worked from home in industries such as dressmaking. By the 1960s, a Greek language school and Greek Orthodox church, St Nicholas, had been established in Fulham.

== Population ==
White: Greek population pyramid in 2021; this does not include Greek Cypriots

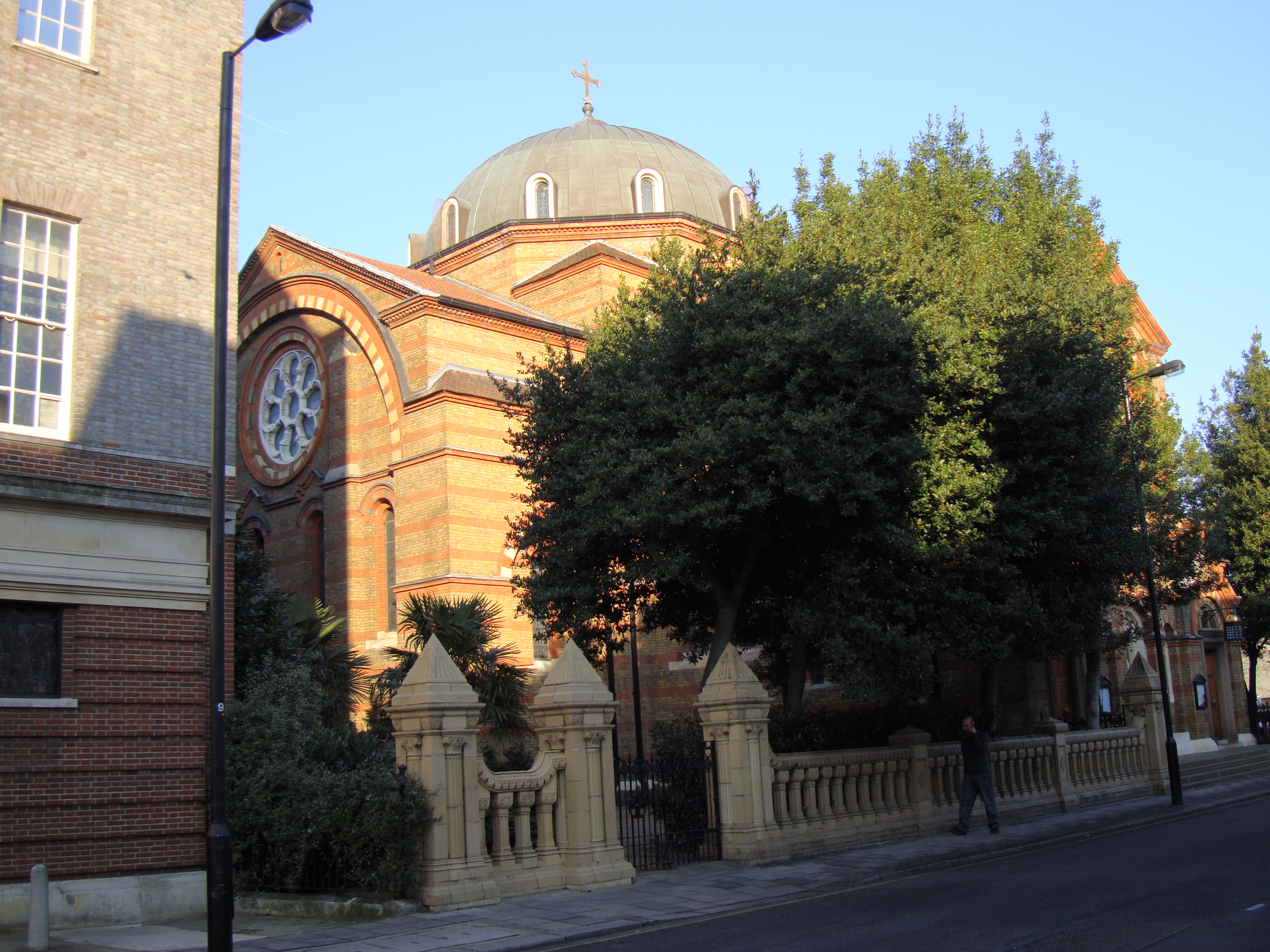
St Sophia's Cathedral, London, the main Greek Orthodox church in the United Kingdom

It is estimated that the Greek population of London numbered several thousand by 1870, whereas in 1850 it had numbered just a few hundred.

The 2001 UK Census recorded 35,169 British residents born in Greece and 77,673 born in Cyprus, although the latter includes Turkish as well as Greek Cypriots. Recent estimates suggest that up to 300,000 ethnic Greeks may reside in the UK. The Office for National Statistics estimates that, as of June 2021, the Greek-born population of the UK was 77,000.

=== Demographics ===
The 2001 Census recorded 12,360 Greek-born people living in London, with particular concentrations in the Hyde Park, Regent's Park, Chelsea and Kensington Census tracts. There are also large Greek communities in Sunderland, Moss Side in Manchester, Birmingham and Colchester. Generally, clusters of Cypriot-born people are found in the same locations as Turkish-born people, with 60 per cent living in areas of London with notable Turkish communities. The Census tracts with the highest number of Cypriot-born people in 2001 were Southgate, Palmers Green, Upper Edmonton, Cockfosters, Lower Edmonton, Tottenham North and Tottenham South. Many Greek-Cypriots reside in Wood Green, Harringay and Palmers Green, the latter harbouring the largest community of Greek-Cypriots outside Cyprus, resulting in these areas bearing local nicknames whereby the Green is replaced by Greek – as in Greek Lanes and Palmers Greek.

According to a City of London Corporation sponsored report, there are between 280,600 and 300,000 Greek speakers in Greater London.

Religion of Greek-born people in England and Wales
Religion	Census 2021	
Religion	Number	%
Christianity	54,874	68.5%
No Religion	15,806	19.7%
Islam	1,190	1.5%
Other Religions	330	0.4%
Judaism	119	0.1%
Sikhism	93	0.1%
Buddhism	69	0.1%
Hinduism	32	0.0%
Not Stated	7,609	9.5%
Total	80,122	100%

=== Students ===
A considerable number of Greek students study in the UK. According to the official UK Higher Education Statistics Agency statistics, 16,050 Greek students attended UK universities in 2006/07, making Greece the fourth most common country of origin amongst overseas students in 2006/07, after China, India and the Republic of Ireland.

== Education ==
There are two Greek international schools in London:

- Greek Primary School of London
- Greek Secondary School of London

== Media ==
- London Greek Radio

== Notable British Greeks ==
- Pytheas, the first known Greek to come to Britain
- Thomas of Argos, captain of a battalion of Greek mercenaries
- Theodore of Tarsus (602–690), Archbishop of Canterbury
- John Servopoulos (fl. 1484–1500), scribe and scholar
- John William Polidori, writer and physician
- Dante Gabriel Rossetti, poet, illustrator, painter, translator, and member of the Rossetti family
- Demis Hassabis, co-founder of Google DeepMind and Nobel Laureate in Chemistry
- Christopher A. Pissarides, Nobel Laureate in Economics
- Theo James, actor
- Karima Adebibe, actress and model
- Nicholas Galitzine, actor
- George Logothetis, founding chairman and CEO of the Libra Group
- George Zambellas, British Royal Navy officer
- Ben Agathangelou, engineer
- Nick Bouras, professor of psychiatry
- Ion Calvocoressi, British army officer
- Peter Calvocoressi, writer and army officer at Bletchley Park
- Godscall Paleologue, the last recorded living member of the Palaiologos family
- Ferdinand Paleologus, 17th-century English-Greek freeholder, sugar or cotton planter, and churchwarden
- Theodore Paleologus, Greek nobleman, soldier and assassin
- Philip Bertie Petrides, colonial judge and administrator
- Al Bowlly, singer
- Gordon Parry, film director
- George Caridia, tennis player and two-time Olympic silver medalist
- Theodore Mavrogordato, tennis player
- Ambrose Petrocokino, traveller, collector and writer
- Baron Constantine of Stanmore, businessman and political activist
- Rafika Chawishe, actress (Greek mother)
- Jamali Maddix, comedian
- John Christoforou, painter
- Damian Grammaticas, BBC journalist
- David Patrikarakos, author, journalist, podcaster and war correspondent
- Julia Bradbury, TV presenter
- Sir Stelios Haji-Ioannou, entrepreneur
- Sir Alec Issigonis, car designer
- Alex Kapranos, frontman of Franz Ferdinand
- K Koke, rapper
- Peter Andre, singer-songwriter
- George Michael, musician
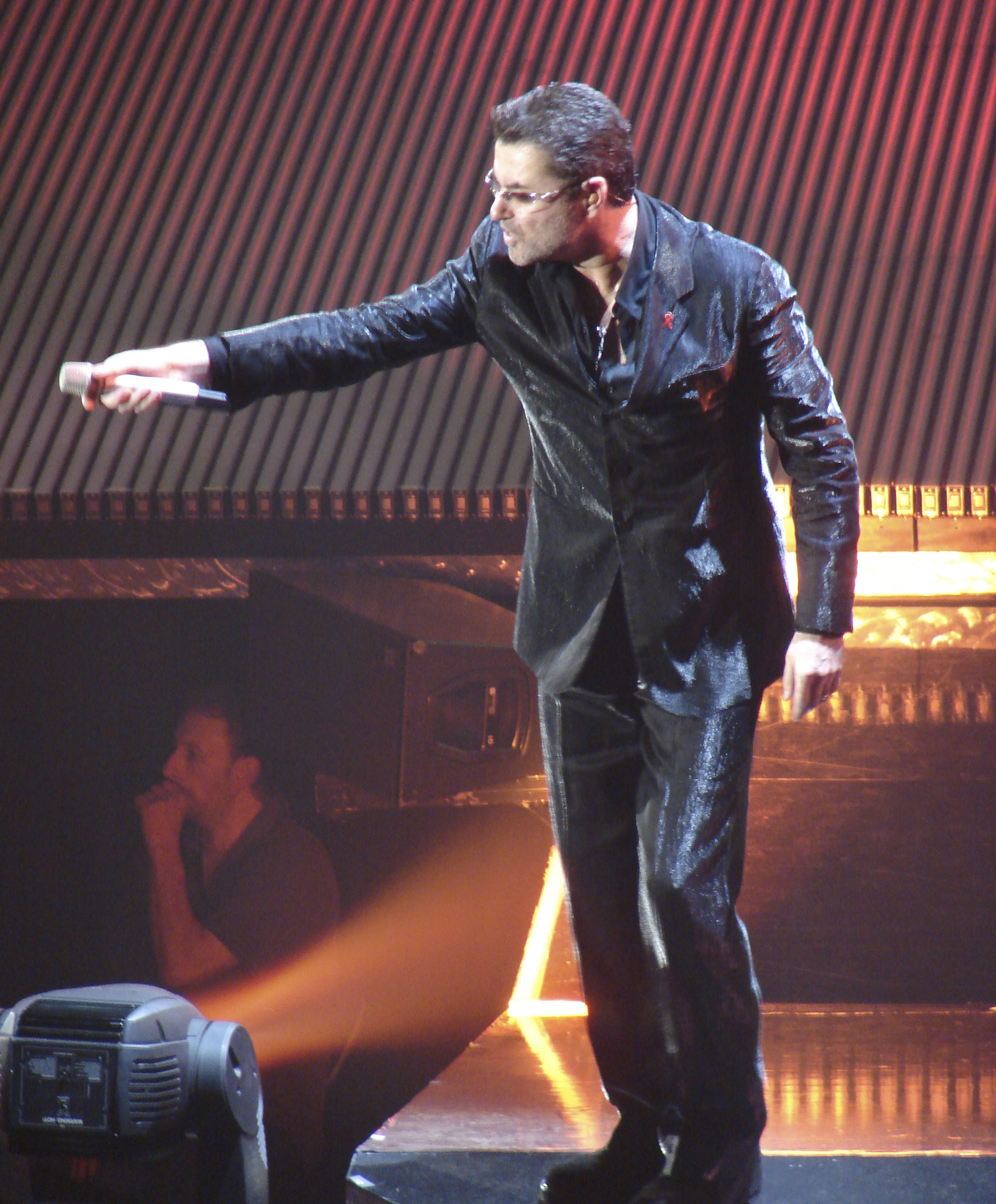
  George Michael, singer-songwriter
- Cat Stevens, musician
- Marina Diamandis, singer-songwriter
- Yannis Philippakis, lead singer and guitarist of Foals
- Tulisa, singer and television personality
- Lianne La Havas, singer-songwriter
- Georgia Salpa, model
- Dappy, rapper
- Antony Costa, member of the boyband Blue
- Sam Pepper, internet personality
- Kathryn Hunter, actress
- Prince Philip, Duke of Edinburgh, consort of Queen Elizabeth II until his death in 2021
- Panayiotis Kalorkoti, artist
- Sophia Kokosalaki, fashion designer
- Milton Mermikides, composer, guitarist and academic
- Sir Eddie Kulukundis, philanthropist
- John Zochonis, industrialist and philanthropist
- Constantine Zochonis, manufacturer and international merchant
- Merck Mercuriadis, music industry executive, artist manager, and entrepreneur
- Nico Ladenis, chef
- Constantine Louloudis, rower
- Alexis Lykiard, writer
- John Saville, Marxist historian
- Andros Townsend, footballer
- Sir Basil Markesinis, University of Texas professor
- Tarki Micallef, former footballer
- George Katinakis, cricketer and British Army officer
- Alexi Murdoch, musician
- Sophocles Alexiou, photographer
- John Negroponte, politician
- Theo Paphitis, entrepreneur
- Gabriel Makhlouf, public servant and policymaker who has served as the Governor of the Central Bank of Ireland
- Henry Pyrgos, rugby union player
- Angelique Rockas, actress and theatre practitioner, pioneer of multi-racial theatre in London
- George Zucco, actor
- George Melachrino, musician, composer of film music, and musical director
- Gordon Haskell, musician
- Vidal Sassoon, of Sephardic descent from Thessaloniki
- Alexis Korner, blues musician and radio broadcaster
- Marina Sirtis, actress
- George Coulouris, actor
- Chris Rokos, billionaire hedge fund manager
- Ian Vougioukas, international basketball player for Greece
- Milo Yiannopoulos, political commentator
- Henry Krokatsis, artist
- Aris Roussinos, journalist
- Mene Pangalos, neuroscientist
- John Papaloizou, theoretical physicist
- Tony Kouzarides, biologist
- Pandeli Ralli, politician
- Pamela Morris, publisher and teacher
- Charles Hamilton Aide, writer
- Alexander Constantine Ionides, art patron and collector
- Maria Zambaco, artist and model
- Marie Spartali Stillman, painter
- Aglaia Coronio, art collector
- Constantine Rodocanachi, physician
- Demetrius Rhodocanakis, merchant, forger and Byzantine pretender
- George Rodocanachi, physician
- Michel Emmanuel Rodocanachi, trader and banker
- Marco Pallis, author and mountaineer
- Marietta Pallis, ecologist
- Ralli Brothers, merchants
- James Scaramanga, World War I British ace credited with twelve aerial victories
- Constantine Scaramanga-Ralli, politician

== See also ==
- British Cypriots
- Greece – United Kingdom relations
