= Renësi =

- Pronunciation: Stressed on the first syllable
- Language: Albanian

Origin
- Region of origin: Lezhë

Other names
- Variant form: Reres

The name Renësi derives from Latin: Laurentius through Albanian sound changes. The unstressed Lau- was removed, while the subsequent reduction of the second "e" in Renes-i to a deaf schwa (/ë/) created the alternative form Rens, which is also found in Spanish documents. Also the toponym Renc of a village near Shkodër in northern Albania was likely derived from the Christian martyr venerated in the area, Saint Lawrence. The village is also known with the form Renesi.

The name of the Arbëreshë family Reres is considered a formation from the name Renes-i through Tosk Albanian rhotacism (Reres < Renes).

== Notable people ==
- Giorgio Renesi, Albanian stratioti captain serving the Republic of Venice
- Giovanni Renesi I, Albanian stratioti captain serving the Kingdom of Naples
- Giovanni Renesi II, Albanian stratioti captain serving the Republic of Venice
