= Giovanni Renesi =

Giovanni Renesi may refer to:

- Giovanni Renesi I (fl. 1568–1590), Albanian stratioti captain serving the Kingdom of Naples
- Giovanni Renesi II (1567–1624), Albanian stratioti captain serving the Republic of Venice
