= Renesi =

Albanian tribe

The Renesi were a medieval Albanian tribe from the region around Lezhë, in northern Albania. The Renesi were Catholic. Some members of the Renesi migrated in Dalmatia and settled in the city of Zara. They became a numerous and important stradiotic family serving the Republic of Venice in the Adriatic cities, as well as the Kingdom of Naples. Forty stradiote members of Renesi are known.

== History ==
Two settlements tied to, or founded by, the Renesi are attested in the Venetian cadastre of Scutari in 1416-7: Renesi (modern Renc) in Guri i Zi whose inhabitants are recorded as having left their village and settled around Drisht to avoid taxes, and Renise (likely corresponding to modern Mali i Rrencit) in Shëngjin which had a total of 13 households. Out of the 13 household heads recorded, only two were from the Renesi: Martin and Nikolla Renesi. Branches of the Renesi had spread across north-western Albania and appear in Marsen (Marshej) in Malësi e Madhe, Bardh near Sheldi, Turk (possibly near modern Ganjollë), Valm in Shëngjin, and Zamoran in the lowlands of Shkodra. Three out of the six household heads from Marsen were of the Renesi: Jon, Lazër, and Andre Renesi; one out of 11 from Bardh: Benko Renesi; one out of 18 from Turk: Nikolla Renesi; one out of three from Zamoran: Stefan Renesi; and one out of 10 from Valm: Stefan Renesi.

== Notable people ==
- Giorgio Renesi, Albanian stratioti captain serving the Republic of Venice
- Giovanni Renesi I, Albanian stratioti captain serving the Kingdom of Naples
- Giovanni Renesi II, Albanian stratioti captain serving the Republic of Venice
