= Kryethi =

Albanian tribe based in northern Albania

Kryethi (alternatively, Krytha, Krythi and later Kruta; in Latin: Crutta) was an Albanian tribe (bashkësi) of the Middle Ages in the coastal areas of northern Albania and southern Montenegro.

== Etymology ==
The name is a compound of Albanian krye- (head) and -thi (boar). Metaphorically, it means strong headed or decisive. The toponym Sfinodol that appears near modern Svinjare in Kosovo in 1455 could be a Slavic translation of this name via the intermediate form Svinoglav (literally swine head). In Venetian archives it has been spelled as Cruetti and Crutta

== History ==
=== Early ===
Kryethi was a community based on kinship ties of the same paternal ancestry. They had kin relations (lidhje fisnore), but in terms of territorial organization, they were a bashkësi in the sense that at that time they didn't have exclusive communal rights over a given a territory as a fis did.

They are found in the cadaster of Scutari in 1416-7 throughout the coastal areas of Albania Veneta. Two villages by that name appear in the cadaster. The village Crueti (Kryethi) with ten households was entirely inhabited by people from this kin community. Its location is unknown. Injac Zamputi who translated the cadaster in Albanian has placed it between Sheldi and Gajtan. This village reappears in the same area in the Ottoman defter of 1485. At that time, it was still a community organized with kin relations as a foundation.

The village of Cruetim (spelled alternatively as Kryethim or Krythim in Albanian) also called Frankeshi appears in the cadaster near the coast. The two bashkësi that lived in the village were those of the Kryethi: Pal Krytha the elder, Pal Krytha the younger, Tomë Krytha and of the Frankesi: Pal and Tanush Frankeshi. Together with the village of Renesi, they were given free rights to fish in the coastline.

Over 25 households linked to the Kryethi appear in the cadaster. Most didn't live in the villages of the same name but were spread throughout the region. They were Catholic. The abbot Pjetër Kryethi (Petrus Cruettio) appears as the head of the monastery of Saint Sergius on the banks of Buna river, close to the modern Albania-Montenegro border in 1410 and then in the cadaster of 1416. Their name is also preserved in microtoponymy like Kodra e Kryethiut (the hill of Kryethi) in Iballë and Gropa e Kryethiut in Rrapshë.

In later times, three villages that were formed by this tribe are attested. The village of Krytha near Dajç appears in 1640 with 20 households. It was a Catholic village that had Saint Demetrius as its patron saint. The other two villages are closer to the historical area in which the Kryethi lived in the Middle Ages. Krytha e Katërkollës (Krute in Montenegrin) and Krytha e Ulqinit (Kruta) both appear in the Ulcinj Municipality near the Albania-Montenegro border.

Venetian diplomat Mariano Bolizza who travelled in the area in 1614 recorded that Krytha e Katërkollës had 30 households and 75 men-in-arms commanded by Gjur Çeka. Seoca a village to the north of Krytha was also headed by a Gioan Cruta (Gjon Krytha). To the south closer to Krytha e Ulqinit, Gjerana today a neighbourhood of the city of Ulcinj, then a small village was headed by Marco Crutta with 180 men-in-arms.

=== Crutta family ===
The fall of Scutari in 1479 and the fall of Dulcigno in 1571 to the Ottomans led many members of this tribe to emigrate in the Venetian-held territory of Zara. Vuco Crutta appears as the military governor of Zara at the end of the 16th century. In 1608-1611, Jacobo Crutta Albanese was a military commander on the Venetian-Ottoman border. This branch still seems to have maintained relations with northern Albania at this name. Jacobo Crutta's son, Simon was a captain in the Venetian army. In his testament, the family ancestral links to the village of Kakarriq (near Lezhë) in Albania are mentioned. In Venetian territories, they first appeared as military commanders and later as their social status rose they increasingly took on diplomatic posts and established themselves in other Venetian territories like Cyprus. In Albania, Franciscus Crutta became the Catholic bishop of Shkodra in 1640.

As Cyprus and Dulcigno passed in Ottoman control after 1571, they start to appear as diplomats in the embassies of European states in Constantinople. In 1693, a branch of them established itself in Pera. Diplomats from this family were dragomans in French, Polish, Russian, English and Venetian embassies. Antonio Crutta belonged to this branch.
