= Marsheni =

Historical Albanian tribe that lived during the Middle Ages

The Marsheni (also, Marshejni, Marseni, Maršenovići, Marsenius) were an Albanian tribe of the Middle Ages that inhabited areas of northern Albania and south-eastern Montenegro. The modern settlement of Marshej to the north-east of Koplik and immediate south-east of Gradec in Kastrat takes its name from the tribe.

== History ==
The Marsheni are recorded for the first time in the 13th century documents of Helen of Anjou who, at the time, had become a nun at the Vranjina Monastery of St. Nicholas. In one of the documents, the Maršenovići are recorded as ostlers for the monastery and are mentioned alongside other Albanians in relation to it, such as Genь Vogli and Bardona. A Đurađ Maršenь is also attested as among the inhabitants of Orahovo in the region of Crmnica near Arbanasa Plačke in Skadarska Krajina.

The Marsheni (recorded as Marseni) are consequently recorded in the Venetian cadastre of Scutari in 1416-17. In the register, they appear as split between the villages of Marseni (Marsheni) and Bishtrrjolla in Malësia. Out of the six households in Marshen, three were of the Marsheni: Pali Marsheni; Andrea Marsheni, the elder; and Andrea Marsheni, the younger. The remaining half of the households were of the Renësi. In Bishtrrjolla two of the household heads were from the Marsheni: Dabesej and Petro Marsheni. The cadastre suggests that during this period the Marsheni lacked the tribal territorialisation characteristic of a fis as they do not appear as inhabiting settlements exclusive to them. Later on following the Ottoman conquest of the region in the late 15th century, the tribe appears again in the Ottoman defter of Scutari in 1485. The register records the settlement of Marshejn, located in roughly the same area as its Venetian and modern counterpart, as a village with 21 households. The anthroponyms recorded are almost exclusively Albanian and patrilineal kinship ties are illustrated through patronyms, for example six individuals attested share the patronym Marsheni: Petri son of Marshen, Gjon Marsheni, Andrija Marsheni, Leka Marsheni, Kosan Marsheni, and Vuli Marsheni.

Dom Mark Marsenius is recorded in 1625 as a Catholic cleric in the diocese of Shkodra.

Toponyms derived from Marshen and its forms can be found in a number of villages in modern North Macedonia. In his works on the region, Jovan Trifunovski recorded the micro-toponym Çeshma Marshin (Çeshma Marshejve, "fountain of the Marshej") in the village of Kopanica. In the same village the mahallah (quarter or neighbourhood) of Marshej appears. In Merovo Marshej appears again as the name of a quarter in the village as well as a family name. Alluding to a partial migration of the tribe into North Macedonia.
