= Alexiou =

Alexiou (Greek: Αλεξίου) is a Greek surname, meaning "son of Alexis". Notable people with the surname include:

- Alexandros Alexiou (born 1963), Greek footballer
- Elli Alexiou (189–1988), Greek writer
- Giannis Alexiou (born 1984), Greek footballer
- Haris Alexiou (born 1950), Greek singer
- Margaret Alexiou, British Neohellenist and Byzantinist
- Peter Vagenas (born 1978), American soccer player
- Sophocles Alexiou (born 1961), British photographer
