= Rragam =

Rragam may refer to:

- Rragam, Shkodër, Albania
- Ramazan Rragami (born 1944), Albanian football player and coach
- Ferid Rragami (born 1957), Albanian footballer
