= Kuç =

Kuç may refer to:

- Kuç, Devoll, a settlement in Devoll municipality, Albania
- Kuç, Shkodër, a settlement in Shkodër municipality, Albania
- Kuç, Skrapar, a settlement in Skrapar municipality, Albania
- Kuç, Tirana, a settlement in Vorë municipality, Albania
- Kuç, Ura Vajgurore, a settlement in Ura Vajgurore municipality, Albania
- Kuç, Vlorë, a settlement in Himarë municipality, Albania

== See also ==
- Kuc, a surname
- Kuči, a highland region in Montenegro
