= Antonio Crutta =

Albanian diplomat (1727–1812)

Crutta Łukasz Antoni Antonio Crutta Antonio Kruta
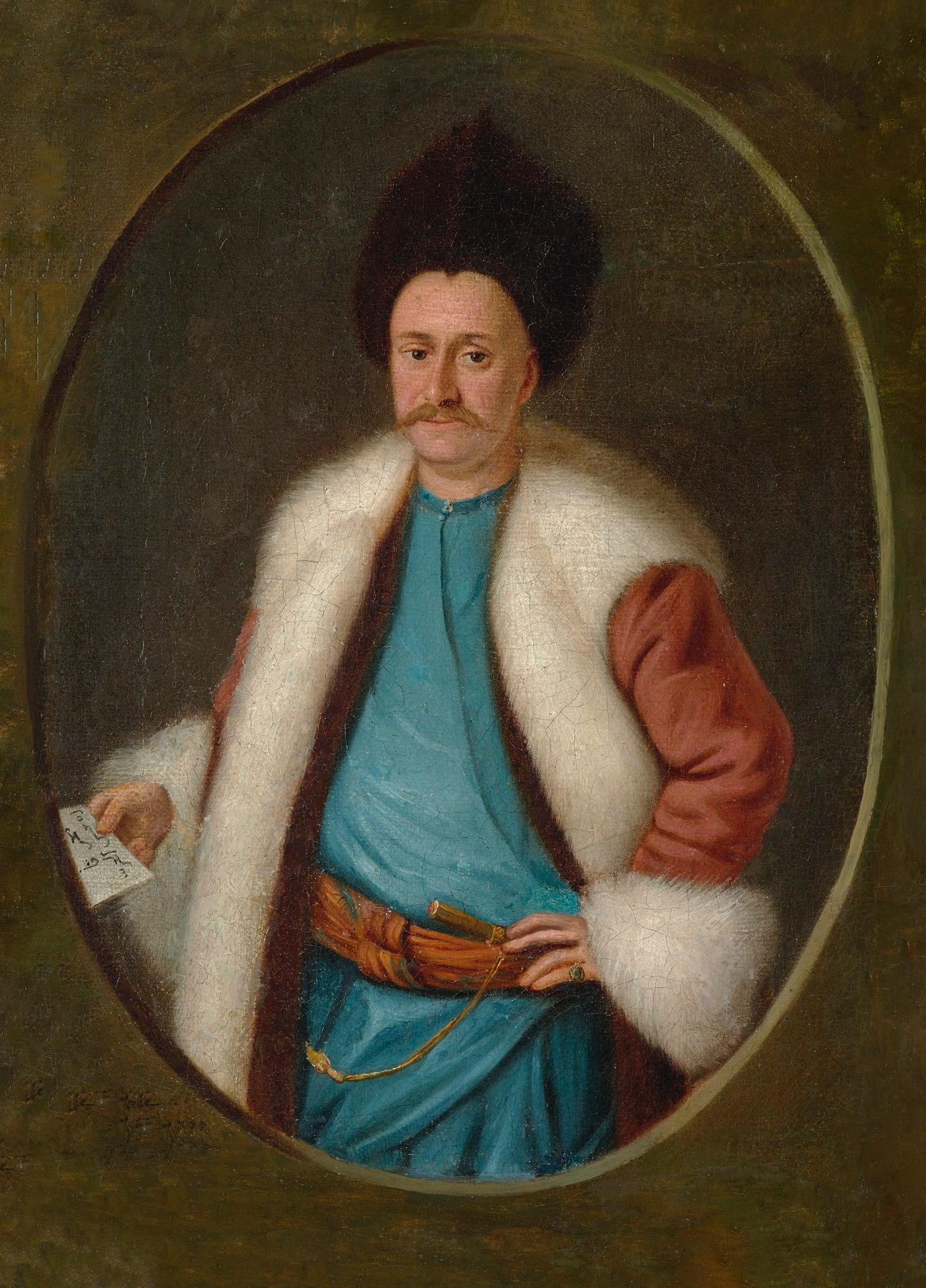
- Crutta Łukasz Antoni or Antonio Crutta
- Born: 1727; Cyprus
- Died: June 11, 1812 (aged 84–85); Lewiczyn
- Occupations: diplomat, interpreter
- Years active: ca. 1747-1799

Antonio Crutta (Polish: Crutta Łukasz Antoni; Albanian: Antonio Kruta; 1727 – June 11, 1812) was a diplomat and politician in the Polish court for around 30 years in the reign of Stanisław August Poniatowski. For his services, to the Polish state he was ennobled in 1792.

== Life and family ==
His father was Albanian and descended from the Albanian Kruta (Kryethi) tribe. His mother was Italian. The family has established themselves in Pera since 1693. They were known to serve Russian, French, English, Polish and Venetian embassies as interpreters. Another member of the family titled "Doctor Crutta" or "Signor Crutta" is mentioned as a dragoman and chancellor in service of the British embassy between 1745 and 1764 in the European colony of Larnaca.

Crutta entered early in the service of Poland on January 1, 1748, as the chancellor of the Republic of Venice in Larnaca in Cyprus. He worked in Cyprus until 1765 when he arrived through the British ambassador to Constantinople to transmit his offers to the King of Poland. Descorches and Crutta worked to withdraw the Ottoman Empire from war in order to maintain the peace with Poland, but due to the insurrection, their work was useless. He asked the Royalty to pay off his old debts which he had acquired in Cyprus and Istanbul and the Polish king paid 23 ducats a month, which Crutta deemed insufficient for his services and complained. He spoke 9 languages. His personal name in archival documents has been spelled as Antonio, Antoine and Antoni. His brother Pierre, and his son Jean, followed in the same tracks, and worked in Istanbul, trying to persuade the French to help the Poles form an alliance. He received an English passport by the English ambassador in Warsaw and travelled to Constantinople where he met French diplomat Marie Louis Descorches. However Tadeusz Kościuszko, who had sent Pierre on the mission, was overthrown and Pierre remained in Istanbul until he died in 1797. Crutta had also served in the British embassy under John Murray, as one of its many "Levantine" (Catholic and Italian-speaking) translators.

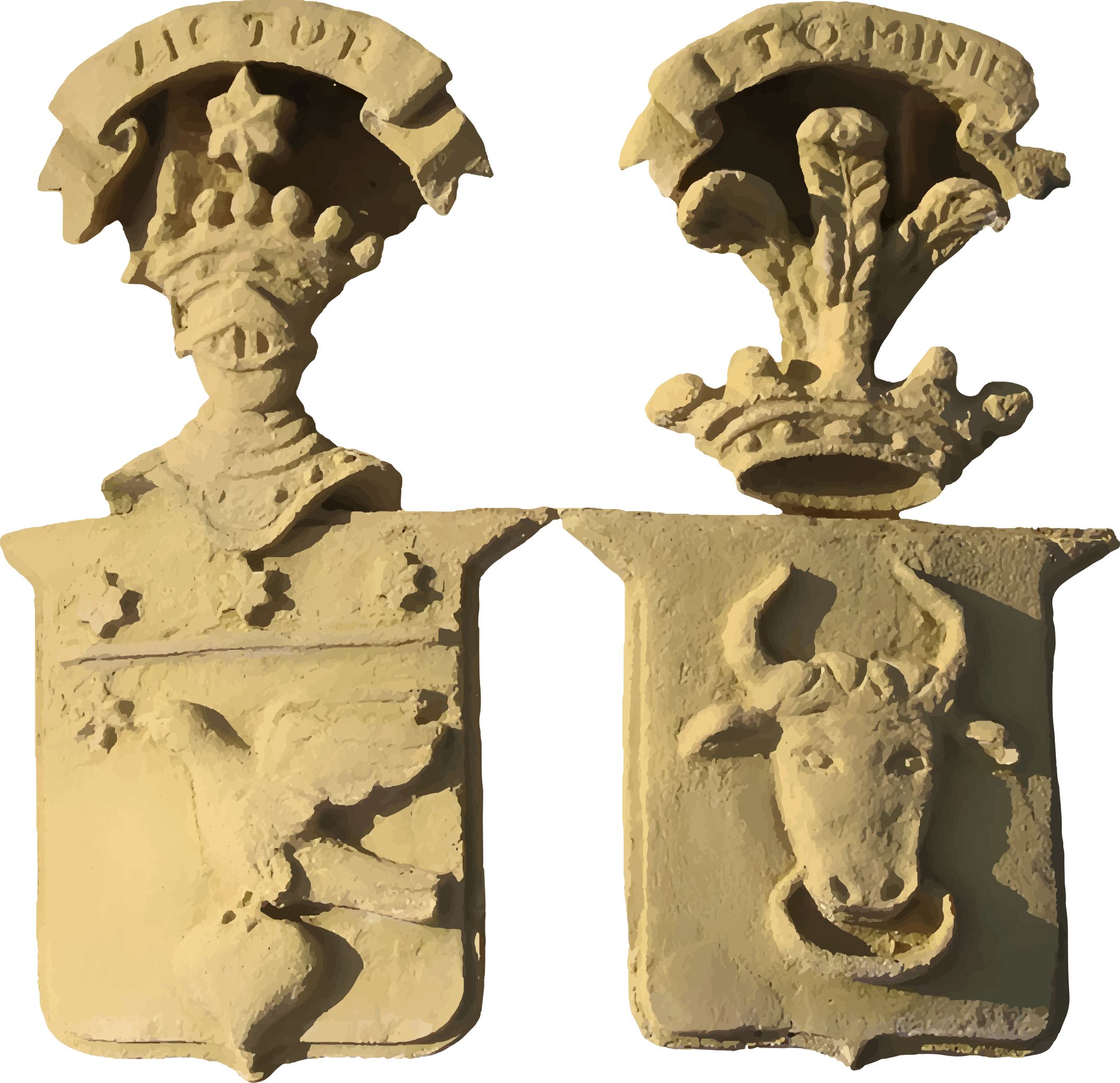
Situated in the northwestern section of the parish cemetery in Lewiczyn, an obelisk carved from sandstone stands, crowned with an urn partially covered by a spire and adorned with a vine garland. Above the epitaph, which details the names of Antoni Krutta (d. 1812) and his daughter Eliza, who was married to General Wojciech Piotr Bedliński, are two intricately carved coats of arms.

His brother, Joseph Crutta, was also a dragoman for the Russian embassy in Istanbul. He spent several years in prison in the Château des Sept Tours together with Russian ambassador Vasily Repnin. There exists a well-known portrait of Antoine Crutta, painted by Canaletto, representing the election of King Stanisław August Poniatowski in 1764. Joseph Crutta wanted to stay in Istanbul and work as the Russian consul as the Russian climate could prove fatal. Joseph Crutta apparently died in 1780 from drug abuse and so did his brother Alexander Crutta. He served as interpreter and translator of King Stanisław August Poniatowski during the Russo-Turkish war of 1787-92 in Poland. His role in the negotiations was to "melt the suspicions of the Turks without arousing the suspicions of the Russians".

Antonio Crutta was also a politician and translator of Oriental languages. He lived in Lewiczyn in the Belsk Duży commune. The Poles called him "Albanian Antoni Lukasz Crutta" and he was a cherished dragoman of the Byzantine and Middle East. He was also a guide and intermediary between foreigners and inhabitants of the Orient. Prior to his service to the Polish king, Crutta had served in the Court of Venice in Cyprus. He spoke Latin, Greek, French, English, Italian, Armenian, Turkish, Tatar and Persian. In 1777, he accompanied MP Numanbey, representing the Ottoman Sultan, and translating Treaty Documents. In 1792, for his services in helping maintain the peace between Poland and the Ottomans that he was ennobled by the Rzeczpospolita. He spent the last years of his life in Lewiczyn, in the estates of his son-in-law, Wojciech Piotr Bedliński. He died there on June 11, 1812, and is buried in Lewiczyn, near his daughter Eliza and her husband Wojciech Bedliński. His grandson, Antoni Bedliński built him a monument which depicts Crutta's name and the Wieniawa coat of arms.

== Depiction in painting ==
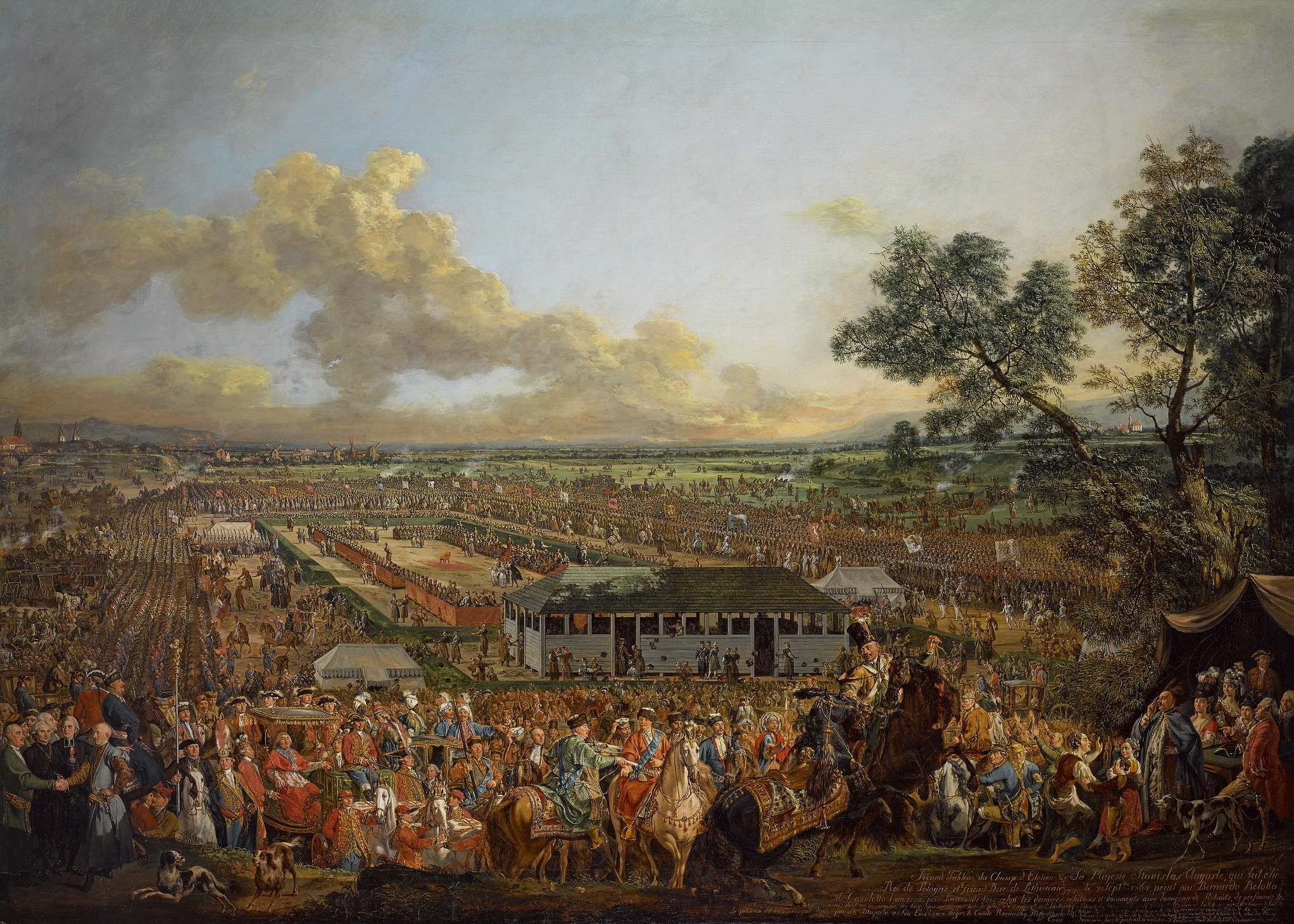
L'Élection de Stanislas Auguste (1778). "Election of Stanislas Augustus" by Italian painter Bernardo Bellotto first in 1776, which was given to court marshal Francizsek Rzewuski. The painting currently in the Poznan National Museum. A second one was painted in 1778 with more details. The painting depicts the election of 1764, September 7, outside of Warsaw, now a district of the capital. According to museum exhibition curator Stephane Loire, curator from the Painting Department of the Louvre Museum Andrzej Rottermund and curator at the Royal Château in Varsovie Hanna Malachowicz, Antonio Crutta is depicted at the far right, standing in front of Bellotto with his three daughters.

Antonio is depicted in Bernardo Bellotto's painting "Election of Stanislas Augustus" from 1776 and 1778. Mieczyslaw Wallis describes him as follows:

Standing in front of the tent, a stout grand man, deed in a fur cap and blue coat, in floral zupper and red greyhounds with a dagger stuck behind his belt, looking through the magnifying glass of the election, an expert in Eastern languages and head office of the Crown Chancellery, Antoni Łukasz Crutta (1725-1812), Albanian, or more specifically Italian, Albanian, probably a Venetian citizen who arrived in 1765 Warsaw, in 1775 he obtained an indigenate, and on February 26, 1778 he received the title of consistory officer in foreign countries.
