= Demetrio Reres =

15th-century Albanian and Calabrian Nobleman

Demetrio Reres Dhimitër Reres
- Epirote captain; Governor of Reggio province in Calabria
- Issue: Vasil; Joan
- Occupation: 15th century nobleman in Albania and Calabria

Demetrio Reres or Demetrius Reres (Albanian: Dhimitër Reres) is considered to have been a 15th-century Albanian and Calabrian nobleman. Since he is mentioned only in a document dating from 24 September 1665, 217 years after the events of the subject, and the document seems to have been falsified, the historicity of Demetrio Reres is debated among scholars.

== Origin ==
The only document that mentions Demetrio Reres reports him as related to the "illustrious Kastrioti family" while no document of the period in question actually supports this assertion.

== Military career ==
According to the tradition, in 1448 troops under the command of Demetrio Reres and his two sons George and Basil went from Albania to the rural areas of the Kingdom of Naples to suppress a rebellion against Alfonso V. Many of the soldiers had requested to be allowed to settle in the area to avoid struggling against Ottomans in Albania. Alfonso V readily gave his approval to the loyal protectors of his rule so they formed the first Arbëresh settlements in the area. His brother and two sons also established several Albanian settlements in Sicily. After the campaign Reres was awarded by Alfonso with the governorship of Reggio province in Calabria. In some historical works these Albanian-populated regions governed by Reres and his two sons were referred to as military colonies.

== Aftermath ==
He sired Joan and Vasil Reres. Andrea Reres, a descendant of Demetrio, founded the Basilian Monastery in Mezzojuso with the provision that the Greek rite would be used. The surname Reres is nowadays common among the Arbëreshë community.

== See also ==
- Renesi

== Bibliography ==
- Petta, Paolo (1996). Stradioti: soldati albanesi in Italia, sec. XV-XIX. Argo. ISBN 9788886211864.
