= Giorgio Renesi =

Giorgio Renesi (Albanian: Gjergj Renësi; Venetian: Zorzi Renesi) was an ethnic Albanian stratioti captain, serving the Republic of Venice in the late 16th century. He participated in various war actions, and fought in different fronts during the Ottoman–Venetian War (1570–1573).

== Biography ==
Giorgio was a member of the Albanian family of Renesi, who originated from the region around Lezhë, in northern Albania. Some members of the Renesi migrated in Dalmatia and settled in the city of Zara, becoming a numerous and important stradiotic family serving Venice in the Adriatic.

Venetian accounts about Giorgio Renesi began as early as the autumn 1570. He was sent by the bailo of Corfu to defend the countryside of Parga from attacks by the Ottomans. Thereafter he participated in different locations in Dalmatia, upper Albania and Epirus, and planned rebellions of the inhabitants of the region with the actions of the Holy League, against the Ottoman Empire. In the spring of 1571 the rebels defeated a part of the army of the beylerbey of Rumelia, who was at that time heading to the north of upper Albania. The rebels managed to take prisoners and murder several Ottoman soldiers.

In 1571 Giorgio became Knight of the Order of Saint Mark, along with other stratiot captains of Albania. Around 1591-1592 Giorgio is mentioned as governor of the stratiots of Corfu.

Bosicchio Renesi and most likely Giovanni Renesi III were Giorgio's sons, born in Zara.
