= Kuc =

Kuc may refer to:

== People ==
- Alma Kuc (born 1998), Polish gymnast
- Armisa Kuč (born 1992), Montenegrin footballer
- Dariusz Kuć (born 1986), Polish sprint athlete
- Edvin Kuč (born 1993), Montenegrin footballer
- Enes Küç (born 1996), German-Turkish footballer
- John Kuc (born 1947), American powerlifter
- Marina Kuč (born 1985), Montenegrin-German swimmer
- Samuel Kuc (born 1998), Slovak footballer
- Thomas Kuc (born 2002), American actor
- Wiesław Kuc (born 1949), Polish politician

== Other ==
- Kuç (disambiguation), various settlements in Albania
- Kiribati Uniting Church
- Kwantlen Polytechnic University, formerly Kwantlen University College
