= Rrencë =

- Village
- Location within Albania
- Coordinates: 42°4′N 19°33′E
- Country: Albania
- County: Shkodër
- Municipality: Shkodër
- Administrative unit: Guri i Zi
- Time zone: UTC+1 (CET)
  - Summer (DST): UTC+2 (CEST)

Rrencë is a village in the former municipality of Guri i Zi, northern Albania. At the 2015 local government reform, it became part of the municipality Shkodër. It is located 1.5 km east of the city of Shkodër and consists of 860 inhabitants and 236 houses. This settlement was founded by the Albanian Renesi tribe.
