= Vukatanë =

- Village
- Location within Albania
- Coordinates: 42°1′41″N 19°32′52″E
- Country: Albania
- County: Shkodër
- Municipality: Shkodër
- Administrative unit: Guri i Zi
- Elevation: 11 m (36 ft)
- Time zone: UTC+1 (CET)
  - Summer (DST): UTC+2 (CEST)

Vukatanë is a settlement in the former Guri i Zi municipality, Shkodër County, northern Albania. At the 2015 local government reform it became part of the municipality Shkodër.

Situated about 3.3 km from Shkodër, in Albania. Vukatana is located in the southern side of the town on the banks of the Drin river, which is the longest river in Albania.
