= Guri i Zi, Shkodër =

Guri i Zi
- Administrative unit
- Location within Albania
- Coordinates: 42°3′N 19°34′E
- Country: Albania
- County: Shkodër
- Municipality: Shkodër
  - Administrative unit: 81.7 km^{2} (31.5 sq mi)

Population (2011)
  - Administrative unit: 8,085
  - Administrative unit density: 99.0/km^{2} (256/sq mi)
- Time zone: UTC+1 (CET)
  - Summer (DST): UTC+2 (CEST)

Guri i Zi (Engl. "black stone") is a village and a former municipality in the Shkodër County, northwestern Albania. At the 2015 local government reform it became a subdivision of the Shkodër municipality. The population at the 2011 census was 8,085.

== Settlements ==
There are 10 settlements within Guri i Zi.

1. Gajtan
2. Ganjollë
3. Guri i Zi
4. Juban
5. Kuç
6. Mazrek
7. Rragam
8. Rrencë
9. Sheldi
10. Vukatanë
