= Kuç, Shkodër =

Kuç
- Village
- Location within Albania
- Coordinates: 42°2′23″N 19°31′31″E
- Country: Albania
- County: Shkodër
- Municipality: Shkodër
- Administrative unit: Guri i Zi
- Time zone: UTC+1 (CET)
  - Summer (DST): UTC+2 (CEST)

Kuç is a settlement in the former Guri i Zi municipality, Shkodër County, northern Albania. At the 2015 local government reform it became part of the municipality Shkodër.
