= Stratioti =

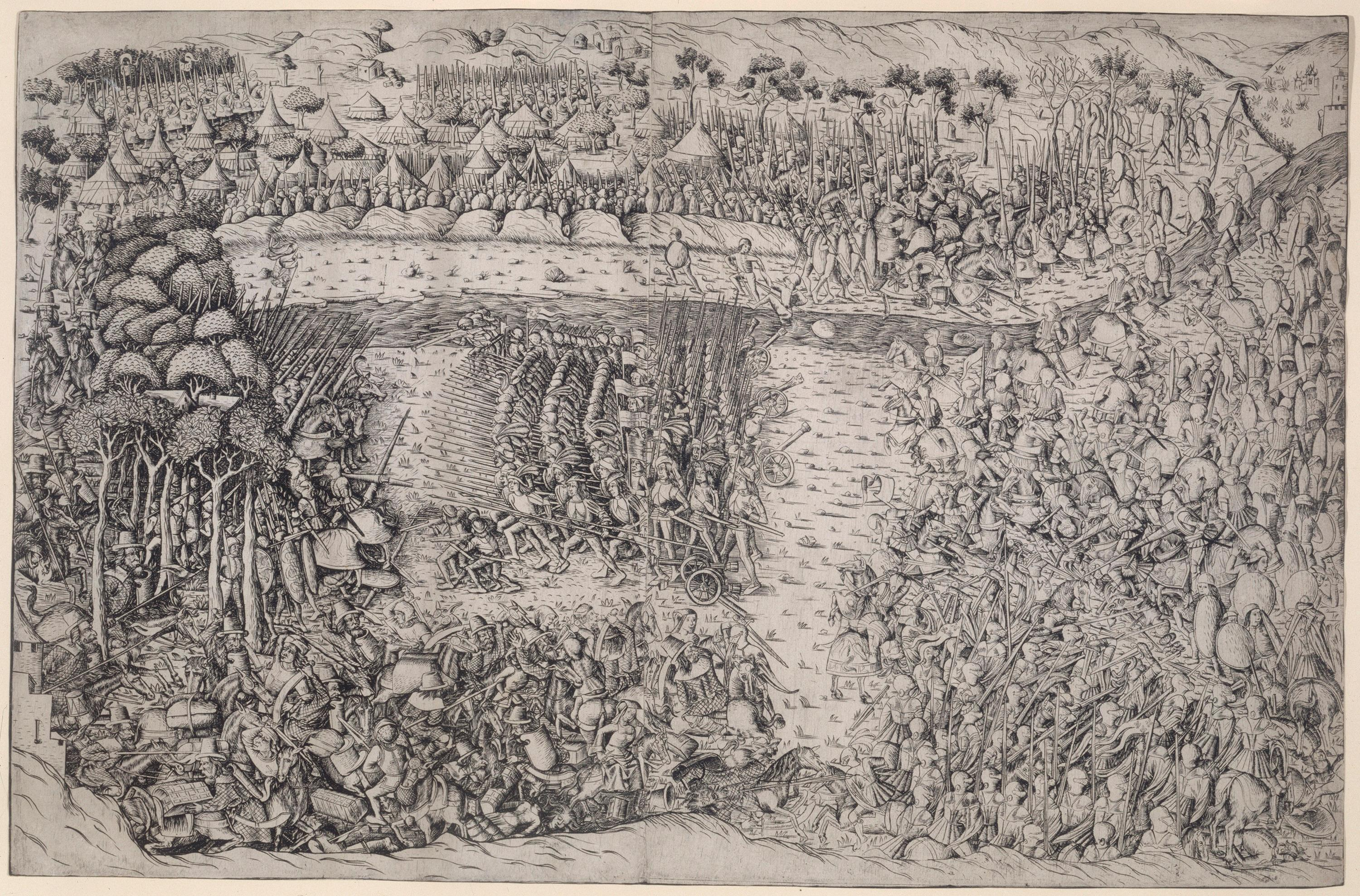
- French engraving of c. 1500 depicting stradioti of the Venetian Army at the Battle of Fornovo
- Active: 15th to 18th centuries
- Type: Mercenary unit
- Role: Light cavalry

The Stratioti or Stradioti (Note: Greek: στρατιώτες, στρατιώται stratiotes, stratiotai; Albanian: Stratiotë, Stratiotët, Stradiotë; Italian: stradioti, stradiotti, stratioti, strathiotto, strathioti; French: estradiots; Serbo-Croatian: stratioti, stradioti; Spanish: estradiotes) were mercenary units from the Balkans recruited mainly by states of Southern Europe and Central Europe from the 15th century until the middle of the 18th century. They were largely of Albanian origin (about 80%), others were of Greek (most of whom were captains) and South Slavic origin. They pioneered light cavalry tactics in European armies in the early modern era.

== Name ==
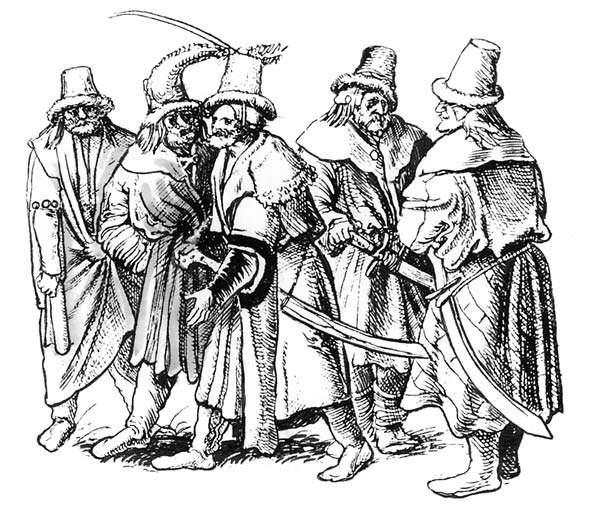
16th-century illustration of Stradiots

One hypothesis proposes that the term is the Italian rendering of Greek στρατιώτες, stratiotes or στρατιώται, stratiotai (soldiers), which denoted cavalrymen who owned pronoia fiefs in the late Byzantine period. It was also used in Ancient Greek as a general term for a soldier being part of an army. According to another hypothesis, it derives from the Italian word strada ("street") which produced stradioti "wanderers" or "wayfarers", figuratively interpreted as errant cavalrymen. Italian variants are stradioti, stradiotti, stratioti, strathiotto, strathioti. In Albanian they are called stratiotë (definite: stratiotët) in French estradiots, in Serbo-Croatian: stratioti, stradioti, in Spanish estradiotes.

Since many stradioti wore a particular cap, in Venice the name cappelletti (sing. cappelletto) was initially used as a synonym for stradiotti or albanesi. In the 16th and 17th centuries the term cappelletti was mainly used for light cavalry recruited from Dalmatia. A feature that distinguished the cappelletti form the stradiotti was their increasing usage of firearms. From the 17th century Venice recruited light cavalry no longer from the Morea, but mainly from Dalmatia and Albania, and the cappelletti gradually replaced the stradiotti. However they had not the same success as light cavalry was gradually abandoned.

== History ==
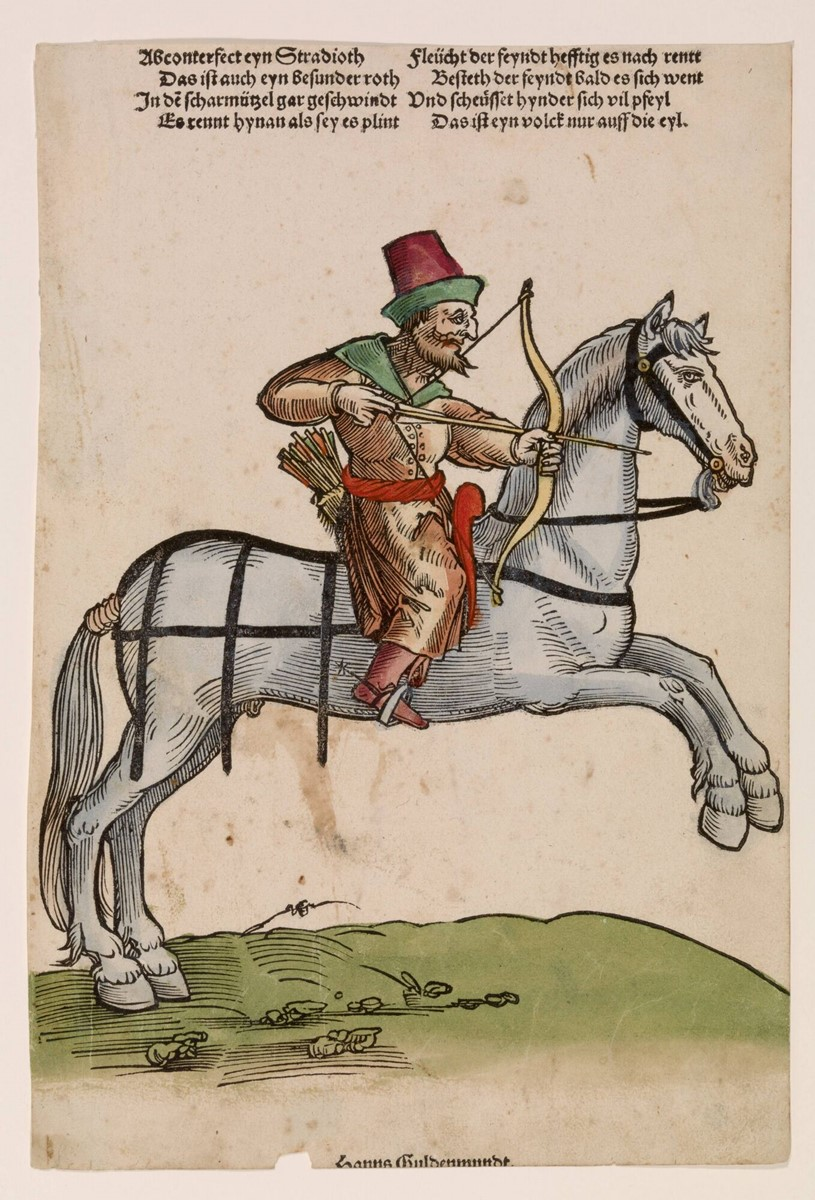
Stradiot Archer

The stradioti were recruited in Albania, Greece, Dalmatia, Serbia and Cyprus. Those units continued the military traditions of Byzantine and Balkan cavalry warfare. As such, they had previously served Byzantine and Albanian rulers, they then entered Venetian military service during the Ottoman-Venetian wars in the 15th century. It has been suggested that a ready pool of Albanian stradioti was the product of the northern Albanian tribal system of feud (Gjakmarrja) and consequent emigration. The precise year when stratioti units began to be recruited in western armies is not known. However, under 1371 state decrees of the Venetian Republic those Greeks that lived in Venetian controlled territories were allowed to join the Venetian army.

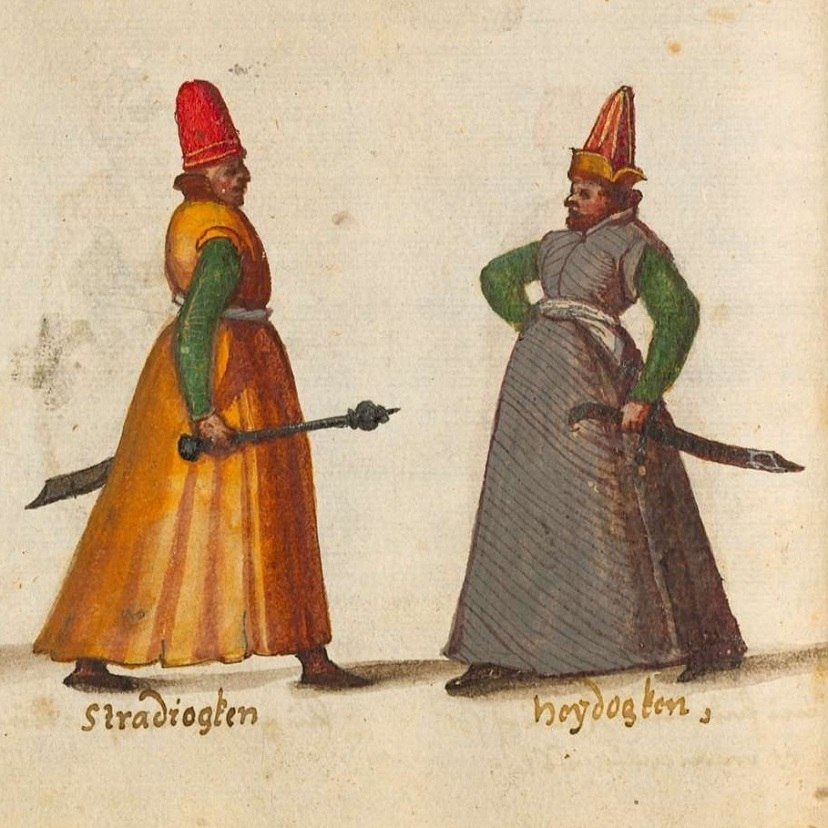
Stradiot and Haiduk

The precise definition of their ethnic identity was the subject of careful study, while modern scholarship concludes that they were Albanians and Greeks who mainly originated from the Peloponnese. Studies on the origin of their names indicate that around 80% of the stradioti were of Albanian origin, and very few of Slav origin (Crovati). The remainder were Greek, most of whom were captains. Some of the officers' surnames who were of Greek origin are Palaiologos, Spandounios, Laskaris, Rhalles, Komnenos, Psendakis, Maniatis, Spyliotis, Alexopoulos, Psaris, Zacharopoulos, Klirakopoulos, and Kondomitis. A number of them, such as the Palaiologoi and Komnenoi, were members of Byzantine noble families. Others seemed to be of South Slavic origin, such as Soimiris, Vlastimiris, and Voicha. Some renowned Albanian stratioti were the Alambresi, Basta, Bua, Meksi, Capuzzimadi, Crescia, and Renesi. The study on the names of the stradioti does not indicate that most of them came directly from Albania proper, rather from the Venetian holdings in southern and central Greece. The stradioti who moved with their families to Italy in the late 15th and early 16th centuries had been born in the Peloponnese, where their ancestors immigrated in the late 14th and early 15th century, after the request of the Byzantine Despots of the Morea, Theodore I and Theodore II Palaiologos, who invited the Albanians to serve as military colonists in the Peloponnese in the attempt to resist Ottoman expansion in the Balkans.

While the bulk of stratioti were of Albanian origin from Greece, by the middle of the 16th century there is evidence that many of them had been Hellenized and in some occasions even Italianized. Hellenization was possibly underway prior to service abroad, since stradioti of Albanian origin had settled in Greek lands for two generations before their emigration to Italy. Moreover, since many served under Greek commanders and together with the Greek stradioti, this process continued. Another factor in this assimilative process was the stradioti's and their families' active involvement and affiliation with the Greek Orthodox or Uniate Church communities in the places they lived in Italy. On the other hand the military service in Italy and other European countries slowed and in some cases reversed the process of Hellenization. Those Albanians of Greece who migrated to Italy have been able to maintain their identity more easily than the Arvanites who remained in Greece, hence constituting a part of the Arbëreshë people of Italy.

== Activity ==
=== Republic of Venice ===
With the end of the Byzantine Empire in 1453 and the breakup of the Despotate of the Morea through civil war between 1450 and 1460, Albanian and Greek stradioti increasingly found refuge and employment with the Venetians. The Republic of Venice first used stratioti in their campaigns against the Ottoman Empire and, from c. 1475, as frontier troops in Friuli. Starting from that period, they began to almost entirely replace the Venetian light cavalry in the army. Apart from the Albanian stradioti, Greek and Italian ones were also deployed in the League of Venice at the Battle of Fornovo (1495). The mercenaries were recruited from the Balkans, mainly Christians but also some Muslims. In 1511, a group of stratioti petitioned for the construction of the Greek community of Venice's Eastern Orthodox church in Venice, the San Giorgio dei Greci, and the Scuola dei Greci (Confraternity of the Greeks), in a neighborhood where a Greek community still resides. Impressed by the unorthodox tactics of the stratioti, other European powers quickly began to hire mercenaries from the same region.

Since the first Ottoman–Venetian war (1463–1479) and later Ottoman–Venetian wars of the 15th and 16th century Stratioti units, both Albanian and Greeks served the Venetian forces in the Morea. In addition the Venetian authorities allowed the settlement of Albanians in Napoli di Romagna (Nauplion) in the Argolis region, outside of the walls of the city. Relations between the two groups and relations between Albanians, Greeks and the central Venetian administration varied. Some families intermarried with each other, while other times disputes erupted as in 1525 when both Greeks and Albanians asked to serve only under the leadership of their own commanders. In the reports of the Venetian commander of Nauplion, Bartolomeo Minio (1479–1483) stressed that the Albanian stratioti were unreliable contrary to the Greek units which he considered loyal. In other reports, attitudes towards Albanians are positive. As Venice lost territory to the Ottomans in the Morea, the numbers of Stratioti the administration employed lowered. By 1524, no more than 400-500 Stratioti remained in Venetian Argolis.

By 1589, four Venetian Stratioti companies remained in Crete. Reports to the Provveditore generale di Candia warn him that the Stratioti should be "actual Albanians" (veramene Albanesi) unlike the Stratioti in Crete who were not "real Albanians but Cypriots and locals who have no military experience". Venetian sources described them more as "farmers than stradioti" who spoke Greek (parlavano greco).

The presence of the Albanian stradioti in Venetian territories for many decades had a significant impact in the way Venetians perceived what it meant to be Albanian. Although Stratioti units settled in western Europe and finally lost contact with their homelands, they were crucial in the spread of Greek-Orthodox and Uniate communities in Venice, as well as in other Italian and Dalmatian cities.

=== France ===
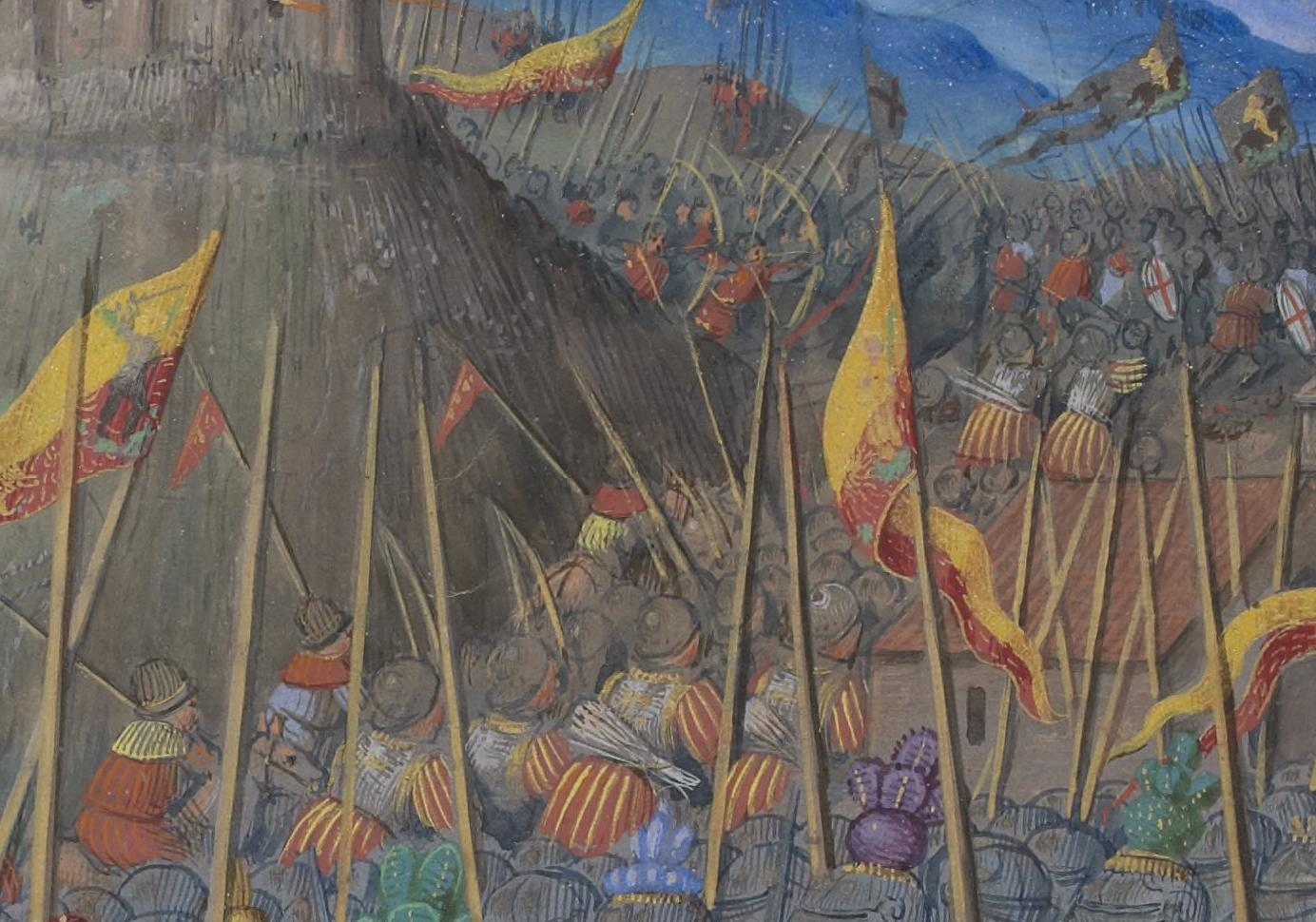
The citizens of Genoa surrender. A detail of the French archers, Stradiots and Genoese to the right of the fortress.

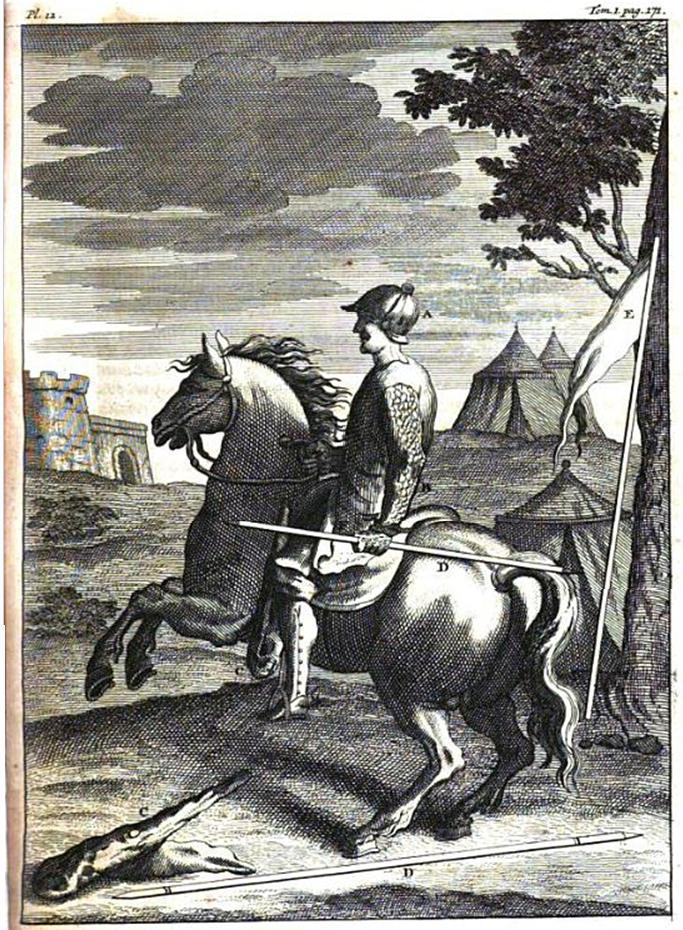
French estradiot and his arms. Notice the short double-pointed spear ("arzegaye"). Engraving, 1724 (G. Daniel).

France under Louis XII recruited some 2,000 stradioti in 1497, two years after the battle of Fornovo. Among the French they were known as estradiots and argoulets. The term "argoulet" is believed to come either from the Greek city of Argos, where many of argoulets come from (Pappas), or from the arcus (bow) and the arquebuse. For some authors argoulets and estradiots are synonymous but for others there are certain differences between them. G. Daniel, citing M. de Montgommeri, says that argoulets and estradiots have the same armoury except that the former wear a helmet. According to others "estradiots" were Albanian horsemen and "argoulets" were Greeks, while Croatians were called "Cravates".

The argoulets were armed with a sword, a mace (metal club) and a short arquebuse. They continued to exist under Charles IX and are noted at the battle of Dreux (1562). They were disbanded around 1600. The English chronicle writer Edward Hall described the "Stradiotes" at the battle of the Spurs in 1513. They were equipped with short stirrups, small spears, beaver hats, and Turkish swords.

The term "carabins" was also used in France as well as in Spain denoting cavalry and infantry units similar to estradiots and argoulets (Daniel G.)(Bonaparte N.). Units of Carabins seem to exist at least till the early 18th century.

Corps of light infantry mercenaries were periodically recruited from the Balkans or Italy mainly during the 15th to 17th centuries. In 1587, the Duchy of Lorraine recruited 500 Albanian cavalrymen, while from 1588 to 1591 five Albanian light cavalry captains were also recruited.

=== Kingdom of Naples ===
The Kingdom of Naples hired Albanians, Greeks and Serbs into the Royal Macedonian Regiment (Italian: Reggimento Real Macedone), a light infantry unit active in the 18th century. Spain also recruited this unit.

=== Spain ===
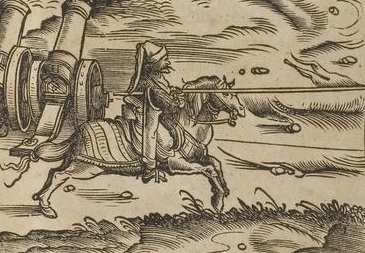
Early 16th century illustration of a Stradiot horseman

Stratioti were first employed by Spain in their Italian expedition (see Italian Wars). Gonzalo Fernández de Córdoba ("Gran Capitan") was sent by King Ferdinand II of Aragon ("the Catholic") to support the kingdom of Naples against the French invasion in Calabria. Gonzalo had two hundred "estradiotes Griegos, elite cavalry".

Units of estradiotes served also in the Guard of King Ferdinand and, along with the alabarderos (halberdiers), are considered the beginnings of the Spanish Royal Guard.

=== England ===
- In 1514, Henry VIII of England, employed units of Albanian and Greek stradioti during the battles with the Kingdom of Scotland.
- In the 1540s, Duke Edward Seymour of Somerset used Albanian stradioti in his campaign against Scotland.
- An account of the presence of stratioti in Britain is given by Nikandros Noukios of Corfu. In about 1545 Noukios followed as a non-combatant the English invasion of Scotland where the English forces included Greeks from Argos under the leadership of Thomas of Argos whose "Courage, and prudence, and experience of wars" was lauded by the Corfiot traveller. (Note: Cramer's translation of A.Noukios' work stops exactly where the text starts referring to Thomas of Argos. A Greek historian, Andreas Moustoxydes, published the missing part of the original Greek text, based on a manuscript kept in the Ambrosian Library (Milan). After Cramer's asterisks (end of his translation) the text continues as follows: [Hence, indeed, Thomas also, the general of the Argives from Peloponnesus, with those about him ***] spoke to them so: “Comrades, as you see we are in the extreme parts of the world, under the service of a King and a nation in the farthest north. And nothing we brought here from our country other than our courage and bravery. Thus, bravely we stand against our enemies, …. Because we are children of the Greeks and we are not afraid of the barbarian flock. …. Therefore, courageous and in order let us march to the enemy, …, and the famous since olden times virtue of the Greeks let us prove with our action.“ (*) Έλληνες in the original Greek text. This incident happened during the Sieges of Boulogne (1544–1546).) Thomas was sent by Henry VIII to Boulogne in 1546, as commander of a battalion of 550 Greeks and was injured in the battle. The King expressed his appreciation to Thomas for his leadership in Boulogne and rewarded him with a good sum of money.

=== Holy Roman Empire ===
In the middle of the 18th century, Albanian stratioti were employed by Empress Maria Theresa during the War of the Austrian Succession against Prussian and French troops.

== Tactics ==
The stratioti were pioneers of light cavalry tactics during this era. In the early 16th century light cavalry in the European armies was principally remodeled after Albanian stradioti of the Venetian army, Hungarian hussars and German mercenary cavalry units (Schwarzreiter). They employed hit-and-run tactics, ambushes, feigned retreats and other complex maneuvers. In some ways, these tactics echoed those of the Ottoman sipahis and akinci. They had some notable successes also against French heavy cavalry during the Italian Wars. Their features resembled more the akinjis than the sipahis, this occurred most probably as a result of the defensive character of 15th century Byzantine warfare.

== Practices ==
They were known for cutting off the heads of dead or captured enemies, and according to Commines they were paid by their leaders one ducat per head.

== Equipment ==
The stradioti used javelins, swords, maces, crossbows, bows, and daggers. They traditionally dressed in a mixture of Ottoman, Byzantine and European garb: the armor was initially a simple mail hauberk, replaced by heavier armor in later eras. As mercenaries, the stradioti received wages only as long as their military services were needed. They wore helmets which were known as "chaska", from the Spanicsh word "casco". From the end of the 15th century they also used gunpowder weapons.

The stradioti wore particular caps, which were very similar to those of the Albanian ethnographic region of Labëria, with conical shape and a small extension, reinforced inside by several sheets of paper attached together, ensuring surprising resistance. Those caps were called chapeau albanois (Albanian hat) in French.

== Notable Stratioti ==
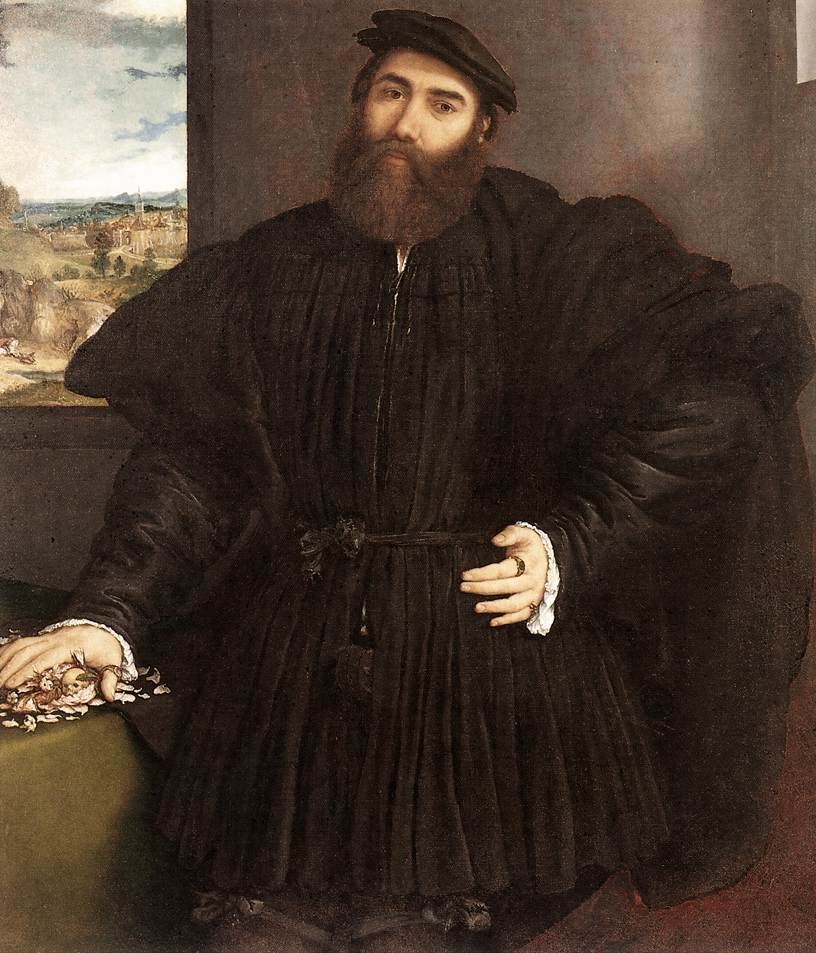
Mercurio Bua by Lorenzo Lotto

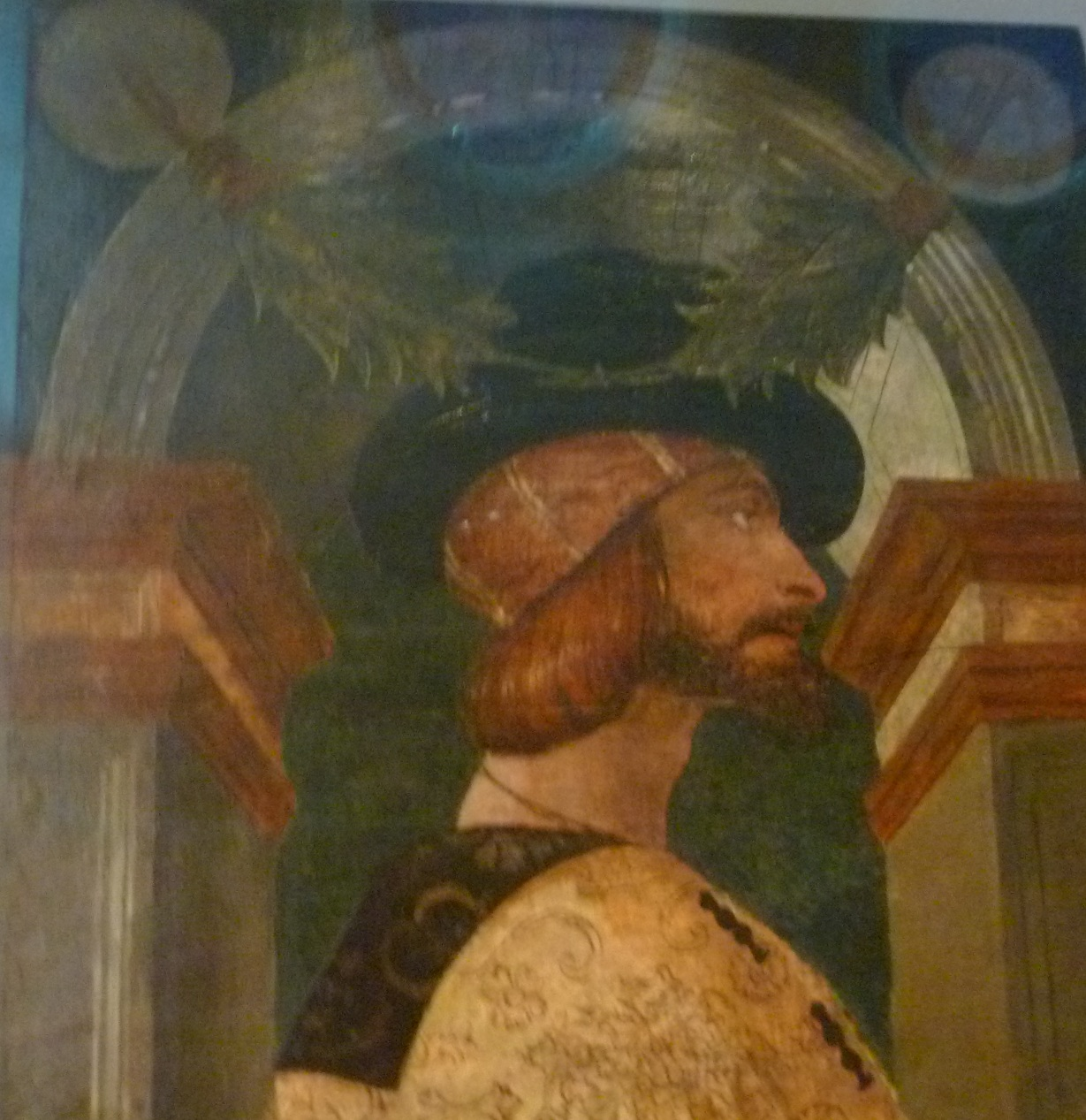
Theodoros Paleologos the Stradiot

- Thomas of Argos, Greek captain of a battalion of 550 Greek stratioti who served in the English army in the era of Henry VIII. Thomas was injured in the Siege of Boulogne (1546) fighting victoriously against a unit of more than 1,000 French (Moustoxydes, 1856)
- Giorgio Basta, Italian general, diplomat, and writer of Arbëreshë origin
- Peter Bua, Albanian stratioti captain in the Morea
- Mercurio Bua (son of Peter Bua), stratioti captain who participated in the important phases of the Italian Wars between 1489 and 1559 serving the Republic of Venice, the Duke of Milan Ludovico Sforza, the Kingdom of France, the Holy Roman Emperor Maximilian I and then Venice again
- Theodore Bua, Albanian stratioti captain
- Demetrio Capuzzimati, Albanian stratioti captain in Flanders and Italy
- Teodoro Crescia, Albanian stratioti captain in Italy, Flanders, Germany
- Panagiotis Doxaras, Greek horseman by the Venetian army and painter (1662–1729)
- Mark Gjini Albanian stratioti captain serving under Venice
- Krokodeilos Kladas, Stratioti captain and military leader
- Petros Lantzas (d. 1608), Greek stratioti captain
- Michael Tarchaniota Marullus, Greek Renaissance scholar, poet and humanist
- Emmanuel Mormoris, 16th century commander
- Graitzas Palaiologos, Greek stratioti commander
- Pedro de Candia (1485–1542), Greek stratioti who later served as a conquistador under the Spanish Crown, participating in the exploration of Panama and Colombia and the conquest of Peru
- Giovanni Renesi I (active 1568–1590), Albanian stratioti, served in the Kingdom of Naples
- Giovanni Renesi II (1567–1624), Albanian stratioti in Dalmatia and Republic of Venice; active in anti-Ottoman espionage and military action
- Demetrio Reres, Albanian Stratioti captain and nobleman

== Bibliography ==
=== Primary sources ===
- Bembi, Petri (1551). Historiae Venetae. Venetiis: Apud Aldi Filios. Available online in Latin.
- Bembo, Pietro (1780). Storia Veneta (in Italian). Venice.
- De Commines, Philip (1901). Memoirs. first published in 1524.
  - Battle of Fornovo: Memoirs, 1856 edition, London, vol. 2, p. 201.

=== Secondary sources ===
- Birtachas, Stathis (2018). "15 – Stradioti, Cappelletti, Compagnie or Milizie Greche: 'Greek' Mounted and Foot Mercenary Companies in the Venetian State (Fifteenth to Eighteenth Centuries)". A Military History of the Mediterranean Sea – Aspects of War, Diplomacy, and Military Elites. BRILL. ISBN 978-90-04-36204-8.
- Bugh, Glenn Richard (2002). Andrea Gritti and the Greek stradiots of Venice in the early 16th century. Vol. 32. Thesaurismata (Bulletin of the Istituto Ellenico di Studi Bizantini e Postbizantini di Venezia). pp. 81–94.
- Detrez, Raymond; Plas, Pieter (2005). Developing Cultural Identity in the Balkans: Convergence vs Divergence. Peter Lang. ISBN 90-5201-297-0.
- English Historical Review (2000). "Shorter Notice. Greek Emigres in the West, 1400–1520. Jonathan Harris". The English Historical Review. 115 (460). Oxford Journals: 192–193. doi:10.1093/ehr/115.460.192.
- Downing, Brian M. (1992). The Military Revolution and Political Change: Origins of Democracy and Autocracy in Early Modern Europe. Princeton University Press. ISBN 0-691-02475-8.
- Floria, B. N. (1978). "Vykhodtsy iz Balkanakh stran na russkoi sluzhbe". Balkanskia Issledovaniia 3, Osloboditel'nye Dvizheniia Na Balkanakh. Moscow: 57–63.
- Floristán, José M. (2019). "Stradioti albanesi al servizio degli Asburgo di Spagna (I): le famiglie albanesi Bua, Crescia e Renesi". Shêjzat – Pleiades (1–2): 3–46.
- Floristán, José M. (2020). "Estradiotes albaneses al servicio de los Austrias españoles (II): familias Alambresi, Basta, Capuzzimadi". Shêjzat – Pleiades (1–2): 232–260.
- Folengo, Teofilo; Mullaney, Ann E. (2008). Baldo, Books 13-15. Harvard University Press. ISBN 978-0-674-03124-1.
- Galaty, Michael; Lafe, Ols; Lee, Wayne; Tafilica, Zamir (2013). Light and Shadow: Isolation and Interaction in the Shala Valley of Northern Albania. The Cotsen Institute of Archaeology Press. ISBN 978-1-931745-71-0.
- Gramaticopolo, Andrea (2016). Stradioti: alba, fortuna e tramonto dei mercenari greco-albanesi al servizio della Serenissima (in Italian). Soldiershop Publishing. ISBN 9788893270489.
- Hammer, Paul E. J. (2003). Elizabeth's Wars: War, Government, and Society in Tudor England, 1544–1604. Palgrave Macmillan. ISBN 0-333-91942-4.
- Higham, Robin D. S. (1972). A Guide to the Sources of British Military History. Routledge & Kegan Paul. ISBN 0-7100-7251-1.
- Hoerder, Dirk (2002). Cultures in Contact: World Migrations in the Second Millennium. Duke University Press. ISBN 0-8223-2834-8.
- Howard, Michael (2009). War in European History. Oxford University Press. ISBN 978-0-19-954619-0.
- Kondylis, Athanaios (2006). Το Ναύπλιο (1389–1540): μια ευρωπαϊκή πόλη στην ελληνο-βενετική Ανατολή. Didaktorika.gr (Thesis). University of Athens. hdl:10442/hedi/22368.
- Korre, Katerina (2018). Μισθοφόροι stradioti της Βενετίας: πολεμική και κοινωνική λειτουργία (15ος-16ος αιώνας) (Thesis) (in Greek). Greece: Ionian University.
- Minchella, Giuseppina (2015). Frontiere aperte: Musulmani, ebrei e cristiani nella Repubblica di Venezia (XVII secolo). Viella. ISBN 978-88-6728-532-7.
- Monter, E. William (2007). A Bewitched Duchy: Lorraine and its Dukes, 1477–1736. Librairie Droz. ISBN 978-2-600-01165-5.
- Muhaj, Ardian (2016a). "Roli dhe prania e luftëtarëve shqiptarë në Europën veriore në shek. XVI" [The Role and Presence of the Albanian Light Cavalry in Northern Europe in the 16th Century]. Studime Historike (1–2): 81–98. ISSN 0563-5799.
- Muhaj, Ardian (2016b). "Le origini economiche e demografiche dell'insediamento degli arbëreshë in Italia. Dal medioevo alla prima età moderna". Basiliskos: 21–34. ISBN 978-88-98432-16-5. ISSN 2284-2047.
- Nicol, Donald M. (1988). Byzantium and Venice: A Study in Diplomatic and Cultural Relations. Cambridge: Cambridge University Press. ISBN 0-521-34157-4.
- Nicol, Donald M. (1994). The Byzantine Lady: Ten Portraits, 1250–1500. Cambridge and New York: Cambridge University Press. ISBN 0-521-45531-6.
- Nicol, Donald MacGillivray (2002). The Immortal Emperor: The Life and Legend of Constantine Palaiologos, Last Emperor of the Romans. Cambridge University Press. ISBN 0-521-89409-3.
- Nadin, Lucia (2008). Migrazioni e integrazione: il caso degli Albanesi a Venezia (1479–1552). Bulzoni. ISBN 978-8878703407.
- Nicol, Donald MacGillivray (1968). The Byzantine Family of Kantakouzenos (Cantacuzenus) ca. 1100–1460: A Genealogical and Prosopographical Study. Dumbarton Oaks Center for Byzantine Studies, Trustees for Harvard University.
- Nicolle, David; McBride, Angus (1988). Hungary and the Fall of Eastern Europe 1000–1568. Osprey Publishing. ISBN 0-85045-833-1.
- Nicolle, David; Rothero, Christopher (1989). The Venetian Empire 1200–1670. Osprey Publishing. ISBN 0-85045-899-4.
- Pappas, Nicholas Charles (1991). Greeks in Russian Military Service in the Late Eighteenth and Early Nineteenth Centuries. Institute for Balkan Studies. p. 7. "The stratioti continued the Byzantine and Balkan traditions of cavalry warfare, which emphasized ambushes, hit-and-run assaults, feigned retreats, counterattacks and other tactics little known to western armies of the time. Indeed, when the Venetians introduced stradioti into Italy in the late fifteenth century, they caused sensation among the condottieri and their warriors, principally because their tactics were so effective even against heavy cavalry. A number of military historians, including Paolo Iovio, Coriolano Cippico, Mario Sanudo, Erculi Riccoti, and Daniel E. Handy have described the activities of the stradioti in the West, and some military historians even attribute the reintroduction of light cavalry tactics in Western armies to the influence of the stradioti in Venetian armies."
- Pappas, Nicholas C. J. "Stradioti: Balkan Mercenaries in Fifteenth and Sixteenth Century Italy". Sam Houston State University. Archived from the original on 2015-09-24.
- Sathas, Konstantinos (1867). Hellenika Anekdota (Volume 1) (in Greek). Available online
- Setton, Kenneth M. (1976). The Papacy and the Levant (1204–1571), Volume I: The Thirteenth and Fourteenth Centuries. Vol. 1. Philadelphia: The American Philosophical Society. ISBN 0-87169-114-0.
- Societa Italiana di Studi Araldici (2005). "Sul Tutto: Periodico della Societa Italiana di Studi Araldici, No. 3" (PDF).
- Tardivel, Louis (1991). Répertoire des emprunts du français aux langues étrangères (in French). Québec: Les éditions du Septentrion. ISBN 2-921114-51-8.
- Wright, Diana Gilliland (1999). Bartolomeo Minio: Venetian Administration in 15th-century Nauplion. Washington D.C.: The Catholic University of America.
