= Thomas of Argos =

Captain of a battalion of Greek mercenaries

Thomas of Argos (Greek: Θωμάς εξ Άργους in the primary source) was the captain of a battalion of Greek stratioti who served as mercenaries with the English army during Henry VIII's wars against the Scots. Some details about Thomas' action are recorded by his contemporary Nikandros Noukios, who followed as a non-combatant the English invasion of Scotland in 1545 and the expedition to Boulogne in 1546. A part of Noukios' manuscript (originally in Greek) was published in English in 1841. A consequent part of the original manuscript, continuing the narration about Thomas, was published by the Greek historian Andreas Moustoxydes.

Thomas was the head of a unit of stratioti from the Peloponnese and is described as a man of "courage, prudence and experience in wars". Noukios followed Thomas and the English army to the River Tweed between England and Scotland where the light cavalry of stratioti made incursions against the Scots.

Noukios describes a confrontation between Thomas' unit of about 550 men and a superior group of some 1,000 French during the Siege of Boulogne. He gives a description of the unorthodox tactics, typical of the stratioti light cavalry, against a numerically superior unit of heavy armored cavalry. Before the battle Thomas boosted the courage of his men with this short speech:

Comrades, as you see we are in the extreme parts of the world, under the service of a King and a nation in the farthest north. And nothing we brought here from our country other than our courage and bravery. Thus, bravely we stand against our enemies, because their numbers cannot match our virtue. We are children of the Greeks(*) and we are not afraid of the barbarian horde. ... Therefore, courageous and orderly let us march to the enemy, ... and let us prove with our action the famous since olden times virtue of the Greeks(*)
(*) _{Έλληνες (Hellenes) in the original Greek text.}

The Greeks ambushed the French coming from Boulogne in early dawn and with maneuvers caused them to retreat in disarray. The battle was carried out mainly with lances and swords leaving 35 Greeks and 360 French dead. Thomas was wounded during that battle. Henry VIII praised his bravery and granted him an annual salary.

After the Boulogne expedition Thomas returned to England and Noukios departed to Italy.

Noukios mentions no other name for Thomas of Argos. Nicholas C. J. Pappas assumes that he is the same person as a Thomas Bouas, who was arrested by the French and executed in Turin in 1546.
