= Merovo =

Merovo Мерово Merovë
- Village
- Location within North Macedonia
- Coordinates: 41°56′N 21°10′E
- Country: North Macedonia
- Region: Polog
- Municipality: Želino

Population (2021)
  - Total: 544
- Time zone: UTC+1 (CET)
  - Summer (DST): UTC+2 (CEST)
- Car plates: TE
- Website: .

Merovo (Macedonian: Мерово, Albanian: Merovë) is a village in the municipality of Želino, North Macedonia.

== Demographics ==
As of the 2021 census, Merovo had 544 residents with the following ethnic composition:

- Albanians 515
- Persons for whom data are taken from administrative sources 29

According to the 2002 census, the village had a total of 901 inhabitants. Ethnic groups in the village include:

- Albanians 882
- Macedonians 1
- Others 18
