= Ambrose Petrocokino =

British businessman and collector

Ambrouzios 'Ambrose' Petrocokino
- Born: Ambrouzios Petrocokino; 20 January 1864; Bradford, West Yorkshire, England
- Died: 10 October 1926 (aged 62)
- Known for: Travel writer, politician, collector and donor of artefacts
- Spouse: Violet Anne May Sykes
- Children: Paul Ambrouzios Petrocokino

Ambrose Petrocokino (1864–1926) was a British business owner of Greek descent who was known as an avid traveller and collector of artefacts from India, China and Japan. He wrote two books describing his adventurous travels in South America and India. He also followed a military career, as a soldier in three different wars, including World War I.

== Early life and education ==
Ambrose Petrocokino was born on 20 January 1864 in Eldon Lodge, Bradford. He was the fifth child of an extended family of Greek émigrés who settled in Bradford, West Yorkshire in the mid-nineteenth century, following the Chios massacre and the dispersal of Greeks to western Europe to escape persecution under the Ottoman Empire.

His parents were Themistocles Pandia Petrocokino (1824–1900) and Merope Mavrogordato (1839–1912) both from Greece. The family later moved to Sedgley House near Manchester in 1876. They modified and extended the house over the following 20 years to accommodate their large family and servants. Sedgley House, now Sedgley Park Police Training College, retains many of its original architectural features, with the interior bearing the Petrocokino family crest on ceilings, staircases, and lamps installed by the family. The house, a Grade II listed building, is described by Historic England as "a remarkably intact and elaborate late-Victorian interior".

Ambrose attended Harrow School, an independent English boarding school.

== Military career ==
Petrocokino volunteered to fight for the Greeks during the 32-day Greco-Turkish War of 1897; he also served under the British Army in the Boer War (1899–1902) and the World War I. In the Boer War he was part of the Duke of Cambridge's Special Corps. At the start of World War I he enlisted again for the British Army and was in charge of prisoners on the Isle of Wight. However, by 1915 he had transferred to the Hampshire Regiment and served under this regiment in Mesopotamia and North Persia.

== Writing career ==
Petrocokino wrote two books in the early 20th century, describing in detail his journeys of exploration around the world. These were entitled 'Cashmere: Three Weeks in a Houseboat' and 'Along the Andes'.

== Political involvement ==
After leaving his parents' home in the north of England, Petrocokino settled in Reading and later Pangbourne, Berkshire. He became involved in various charities and political activities, in Pangbourne and Purley, standing as a Berkshire county councillor and as a member of the governing body of the local workhouse. In 1904 he married Violet Sykes, the youngest daughter of the late Frederick Henry Sykes, 5th Baronet of Basildon and Caroline Bettesworth. Their life together was relatively short, as Violet died in 1924.

== Travelling and collecting ==
Petrocokino's background and wealth allowed him opportunities to pursue his love of travel and his interest in other cultures. He travelled around the world three times, and during these journeys he bought or acquired a variety of artefacts and curiosities including ivory carvings and Wooden sculptures. Many of these were donated to Reading Museum in Reading, Berkshire after his death. An exhibition mounted by the museum in 2020, entitled 'Animal: World Art Journeys', featured several of these striking and intricately carved pieces, including a number of Japanese netsuke.

Petrocokino died in 1926, and was buried in St Mary's Church in Purley in Berkshire.
