= Rragam, Shkodër =

Rragam
- Village
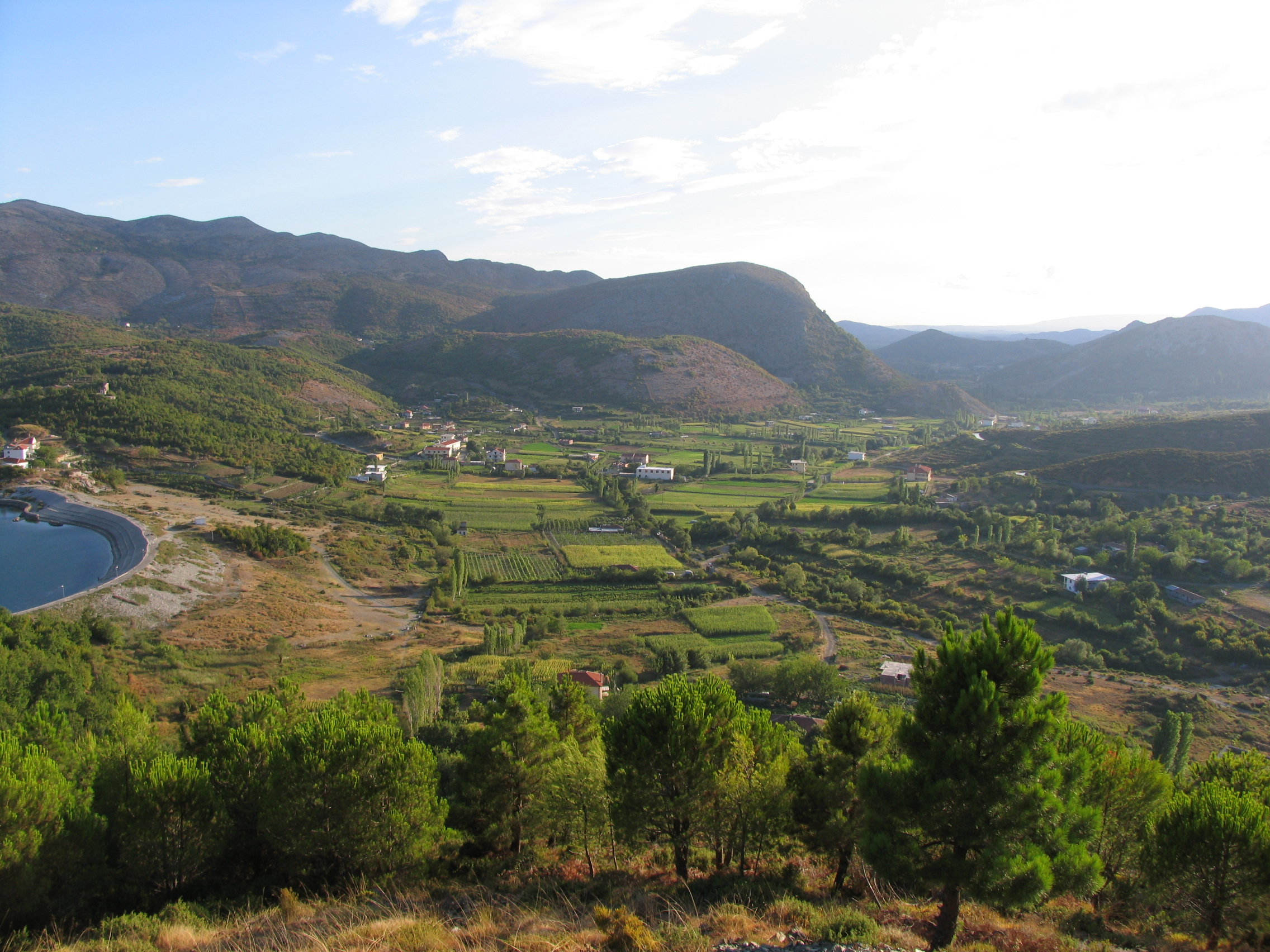

- Location within Albania
- Coordinates: 42°3′35″N 19°36′1″E
- Country: Albania
- County: Shkodër
- Municipality: Shkodër
- Administrative unit: Guri i Zi
- Time zone: UTC+1 (CET)
  - Summer (DST): UTC+2 (CEST)

Rragam is a settlement in the former Guri i Zi municipality, Shkodër County, northern Albania. As part of the 2015 local government reform it became part of the municipality Shkodër. It is part of the Zadrimë region.
