= George Katinakis =

English cricketer

Personal information
- Full name: George Demetrius Katinakis
- Born: 25 July 1873; Bayswater, London, England
- Died: 15 May 1943 (aged 69); Southwold, Suffolk, England
- Batting: Right-handed
- Bowling: Unknown

Domestic team information
- Years: Team
- 1904–1905: Hampshire

Career statistics
Competition	First-class
Matches	4
Runs scored	46
Batting average	9.20
100s/50s	–/–
Top score	16*
Balls bowled	18
Wickets	0
Bowling average	–
5 wickets in innings	–
10 wickets in match	–
Best bowling	–
Catches/stumpings	1/–
- Source: Cricinfo, 13 December 2009

George Demetrius Katinakis (25 July 1873 — 15 May 1943) was an English first-class cricketer and British Army officer.

The son of Demetrius Katinakis, a broker hailing from Constantinople in the Ottoman Empire, he was born at Bayswater in July 1873. Katinakis was commissioned into the British Army as a second lieutenant into the 4th (North York Militia) Battalion, Princess of Wales's Own Regiment of Yorkshire (later the Green Howards) in June 1894, with promotion to lieutenant in July 1895. He resigned his commission in September 1897, and went to South Africa. There he played minor cricket matches for Bulawayo and Rhodesia. Whilst in South Africa, Katinakis was involved in an affair with Elizabeth Scott Brown, the wife of Pretoria-based Major Gerald Handcock; he sought damages against Katinakis, with a court awarding him damages of £1,000. He would marry Elizabeth in 1902. Katinakis had returned to England in 1900, aboard the SS Scot. Following his return to England, he played club cricket on the Isle of Wight. Katinakis made his debut in first-class cricket for Hampshire against Kent at Tonbridge in the 1904 County Championship. He played first-class cricket infrequently for Hampshire, making two appearances in the 1905 County Championship and one in the 1906 County Championship. In four first-class matches, he scored 46 runs with a highest score of 16 not out.

Katinakis was later based in Folkestone, where in April 1913, he was charged with being drunk and disorderly and with breaking the glass windows of his cell.

He returned to military service in the First World War, which began the following year, with the King's Own Yorkshire Light Infantry. He was appointed a temporary major in March 1916, prior to resigning his commission on account of ill-health in March 1917, at which point he was granted the honorary rank of major. He later relocated to Southwold in Suffolk, where he lived during the Second World War. On 15 May 1943, a Luftwaffe air raid on nearby Lowestoft commenced. The Luftwaffe pilots noticed barrage balloons over Southwold and turned south to bomb the town. During the bombing of Southwold, six civilians were killed, including, at their home, Katinakis, aged 69 and his 45-year old second wife, Eva May (nee Harris), whom he had married following the death of his first wife in 1937.
