= Château des Tours =

Château in Montagne, Nouvelle-Aquitaine, France

- Château des Tours
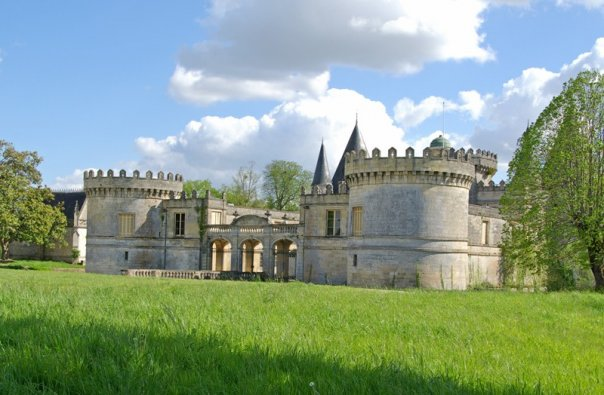
- The Château des Tours

- Location within France

General information
- Location: Montagne, Gironde, France, Montagne, France
- Coordinates: 44°55′30.9″N 0°7′8.9″W
- Construction started: 14th century

The Château des Tours is a château in the commune of Montagne in the Gironde department in the Nouvelle-Aquitaine region of south-western France.

== History ==
The Château de Montagne does not go beyond the 14th century. At that time it had three towers: one had a polygonal interior and was the dungeon, and the others were circular flanking an oblong building on the east and west corners of its south face; then, at the same corners on the north face, there are sentry boxes with Corbels. The oldest part is in the south of the present castle and is also a little higher. The dungeon with its machicolation and its Corbels covered by a dome dominates the whole mansion.

North of the original castle there was a courtyard formed by the castle and crenellated walls outside with wide and deep ditches below. These ditches remain but the walls were replaced in the 16th century by rectangular buildings. At the east and west corners of the north facade there are two round towers, less high than the others, but topped like them with machicolations. There is a door between these two towers above which are the Arms of Calvimont carved on a large stone: they have lain since 1793 a few steps in front of the door.

The Arms of the first Lords of Tours were carved in the tympanum of the door to the dungeon which is, due to the expansion of the chateau, in the south-western corner of the courtyard. The chapel is to the east and, outside the castle, dates from the 14th century although the two spans of the roof much resemble the transitional style of the 12th century. It was lit in the early days, by a single window opening in the rib of the east wall of the chevet but was sealed off in adapting this side of the rural chapel. To supplement it an opening was made in each side wall. The door is the same as the dungeon door.

- Raymond Guinodie, History of Libourne and other towns and Villages and its Arrondissement, Volume 3, 1876

It was restored by Viollet-le-Duc in the 19th century.

== Description of the castle by Bertall ==
The Château des Tours is one of the most interesting, most successful, and most opulent houses in this lovely corner of France. The house is built in the style of the 13th century with additions and connections in Renaissance style: a large courtyard, well decorated, closed porticos in Italian style, crenellated towers and moats surrounding the whole castle - the whole placed halfway up a hill overlooking a large uneven lawn strewn with picturesque patches of woods with old oaks, chestnuts, and old mature forests. At the bottom a stream meanders through the reeds under the shade of large trees. On the horizon, the slopes of the Dordogne that are placed behind the spires, arches, and walls of the ruins of Saint-Emilion.

It is admirable in view, in location, and in disposition. A charming home, the lords are most amiable; pretty babies wave gaily in the shady paths or on the flowery lawns. Beautiful horses, immaculate harnesses, and elegant carriages to go around the countryside. It is complete!

Of the château and the park, which stretches far and gets lost in the greenery of the valley, nothing reveals the wine-growing industry yet this industry is present on a large scale with very happy results in quality and in quantity.

Behind the curtain of tall trees there are cellars arranged with the utmost care, storehouses packed with wine, presses, and vats prepared to receive the harvest, stables for horses and oxen, sheds for wagons, ploughs, and all the tools of the winemaker.

Then, extending to the horizon, there are fields planted with vines spaced regularly and standing five or six feet high, supported by stakes which are called here, I am told, carassons (vine stakes).

Each vine, towards the base of the stock where the branches are fastened and there are new shoots for the year, is surrounded by a belt of rough clusters of blue-black velvet that indicates impending maturity and the next harvest.

- Bertall, 1 October 1876

== Current status ==
The Château des Tours has gradually fallen into disrepair, and it needs urgent restoration work.

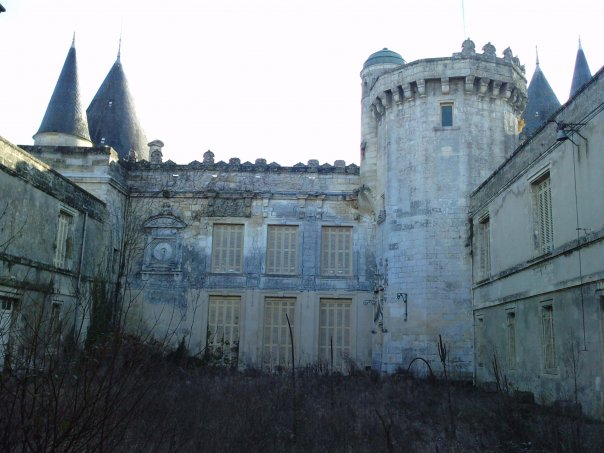
Interior courtyard

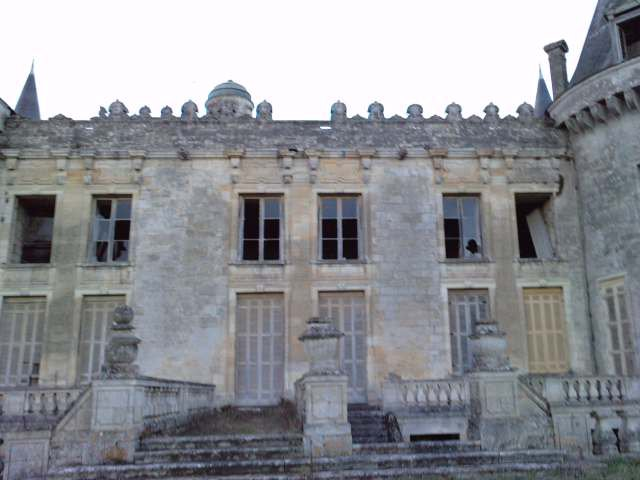
Dilapidated walls

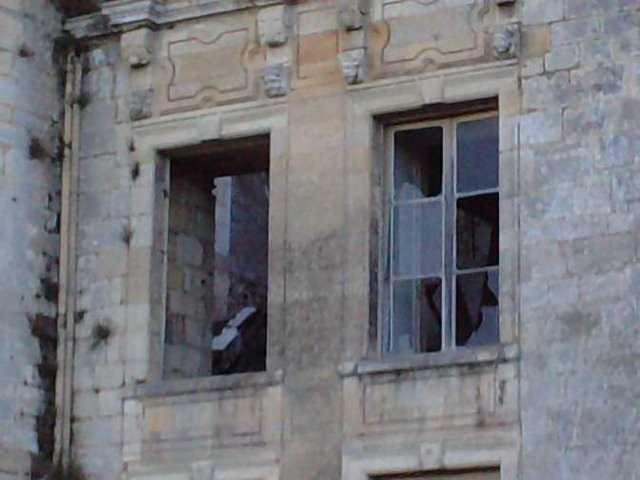
Broken windows

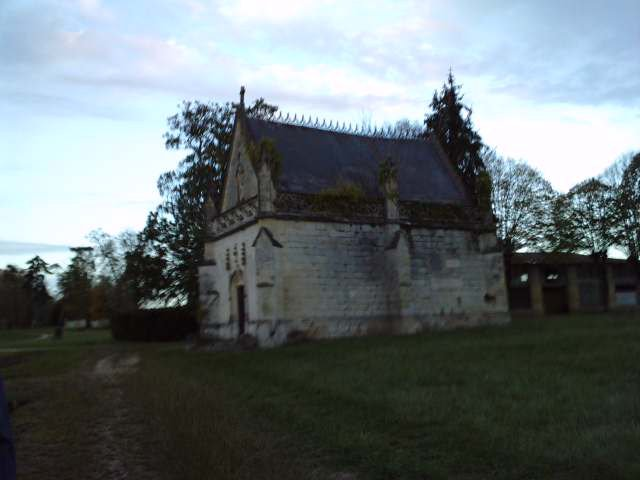
The Chapel

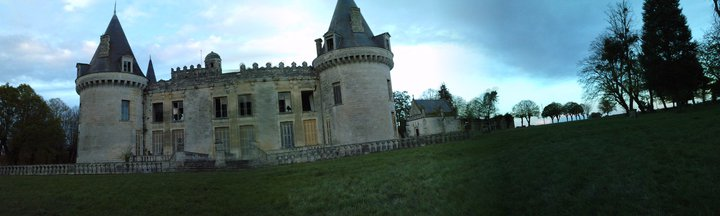
General view

== See also ==
- Château des Tours official website (in French)
