= Gajtan, Albania =

Gajtan
- Village
- Location within Albania
- Coordinates: 42°3′23″N 19°34′20″E
- Country: Albania
- County: Shkodër
- Municipality: Shkodër
- Administrative unit: Guri i Zi
- Time zone: UTC+1 (CET)
  - Summer (DST): UTC+2 (CEST)

Gajtan is a settlement in the former Guri i Zi municipality, Shkodër County, northern Albania. At the 2015 local government reform it became part of the municipality Shkodër. It is part of the Zadrimë region.
