= Giovanni Renesi II =

- Gjon Renësi
- Born: 1567; Zadar
- Died: 1624 (aged 56–57)
- Military career
- Allegiance: Republic of Venice
- Rank: Captain
- Unit: Stradioti

Giovanni Renesi (Albanian: Gjon Renësi, 1567-1624) was an Albanian military captain and mercenary. He was involved in the organization of spy networks in the Ottoman Empire in support of the Catholic powers of southern Europe and he participated in several plans for large-scale revolts against the Ottomans.

== Early life ==
Giovanni Renesi was born around 1567 in the town of Zara (modern Zadar). He came from an Albanian Catholic family, which belonged to the Renesi fis of Lezha in northern Albania. They had settled in Zara as refugees after the Ottoman conquest of Albania and joined the stradioti regiments of Venice like many other Albanian refugees in Dalmatia. His family had produced many military captains, administrators and governors in the Stato da Màr. His father and his brother were both military commanders of the Venetian Republic. Renesi served the Venetian Republic as a stradiot until 1607, when he was banished from the Venetian Republic for murder in a blood feud. Following these events, Renesi would regularly inform the Venetians of his future activities, which he probably did in the hope that they would lift the ban pending on him. A Venetian report in 1617-18 describes him as man of pale skin colour who had a lean body, a black beard and who dressed in "French style" (alla francese).

== Rebellion and espionage ==
At the beginning of 1607, Renesi was in Turin and met with Carlo Emanuele I of Savoy. He proposed to the duke to take part in a rebellion against the Ottoman Turks, which was promoted by the voivode Grdan of Nikšić and the patriarch Jovan II of Peć. Near the end of 1607 and beginning of 1608, Renesi participated in a mission in Mljet, led by Carlo Emanuele who sent out spies to the island and to Ragusa with the intention of supporting rebel leaders who had gathered in order to oppose Ottoman rule. Renesi had as role to negotiate directly with the leaders of the possible uprising rebels.

At the end of the summer of 1608, Renesi arrived in Dalmatia with the envoys of Carlo Emanuele, and informed Grdan about the duke's decision in relation to their previously planned rebellion. Carlo Emmanuele assured his support for the uprising for the months of January or February 1609, depending on the weather conditions. However, the intervention announced by Carlo Manuele for January–February 1609 did not take place and the duke lost all interest in the Balkans. Renesi together with the other representatives of the uprising villages, were forced to seek support from another prince, the Duke of Mantua, Vincenzo I Gonzaga.

Renesi arrived in Mantua at the end of 1609, accompanied by a Dutch merchant and two noblemen from Ragusa. They presented the plan to the duke and informed him that Maurice of Nassau was also desiring to participate in it. The talks with the Duke of Mentua prevailed until his death on February 9, 1612. Later in the same year, Renesi went to Milan to propose to another governor, Marquis de la Hinojosa, the undertaking of the uprising in Montenegro and Albania. Renesi tried to convince the duke by offering him, in case of victory, two of the most important strongholds in the region. Hinojosa encouraged Renesi to go to the court of Madrid as ambassador of the Albanians and the Serbs.

Renesi sent a letter to the bishop of Vigevano Lombardy who relayed it to the Spanish court in Madrid where Renesi asked for military support for the uprising.

In 1614, Renesi was in Parma, to propose the Duke Ranuccio I Farnese to assume leadership of the rebellion. Farnese sent him in the Balkans with money. On July 14 during the Convention of Kuçi, Renesi informed the local leaders of the Duke of Parma's support for their plans and they accepted to recognize Farnese as their lord. These plans were abandoned when he returned to Italy as internal European conflicts stopped any plans for a future campaign against the Ottoman Empire.

On August 1615, the pretender to the Ottoman throne, Sultan Yahya, and the Duke of Nevres met in Paris. Renesi was also present and Sultan Yahya gave him a decree of appointment addressed to the archbishops, nobles and leaders of the Balkans. In the decree Renesi was presented as Sultan Yahya’s ambassador and was authorized to negotiate in his name. The Duke of Nevres gave Renesi a passport which allowed him to travel freely. Renesi left Paris on April 1616, with orders to meet with the Dukes of Tuscany and Mantua before going to the Balkans.

In 1617, on Farnese’s request, Renesi went to Madrid. Farnese ordered his ambassador to Spain, Flavio Atti, to meet with the Duke of Lerma, the secretary Antonio de Aróstegui, the Marquis of Hinojosa and with the confessor of King Filipe II. During the meeting, Renesi told Hinjora that there were many provinces involved in the uprising and he explained to him that they were inhabited by Albanians and Slavs, and not by Greeks. Hinojosa offered to undertake the uprising in a union with Rome and Venice. Renesi argued that the undertaking of the rebellion would involve the initial costs of two armies and 12,000 soldiers. The negotiations at the Spanish court lasted until the end of October 1617, but no results were achieved.
