= Sophocles Alexiou =

British photographer of Greek descent

Sophocles Alexiou (born 1961 in Chelsea, London, England) is a British photographer of Greek descent. He works as a commercial photographer, his main speciality being portrait and wedding photography. He currently works in East Sheen.

Between 1996 and 1998 Alexiou won the London Portrait Group Trophy three times and was presented with the Kodak Gold Award three times. In 2005, he won an award for the best family portrait in Portrait Photographer of the Year. In 2008, he won a Silver Oskar in the British Professional Photography Awards.

== Awards ==
- March 1998 - The winner in the wedding category of the UK Kodak Wedding & Portrait Awards.
- January 2000 - Alexiou's image 'Millennium Woman' was selected for national display in celebration of portrait photography for the new Millennium.
- British Institute of Professional Photography - Portrait Photographer of the Year 2003
- The British Press Photographers Family Portrait Photographer of the Year 2005
- Master Photographers Association UK Wedding Photographer of the Year 2008 and Silver Oskar Winner
