= Giovanni Renesi I =

- Gjon Renësi
- Military career
- Allegiance: Republic of Venice
- Service years: 26 years in service
- Rank: Captain
- Unit: Stradioti

Giovanni Renesi (Albanian: Gjon Renësi; Venetian: Zuanne Renesi) was an ethnic Albanian stratioti captain, serving the Kingdom of Naples in the late 16th century. He participated in various war actions, counting in 1590 twenty-six years of service.

== Biography ==
Giovanni was a member of the Albanian family of Renesi, who originated from the region around Lezhë, in northern Albania. Giovanni left his farm and homeland to follow the Habsburg emperor.

In 1568 Giovanni and Teodoro Renesi asked for a salary from the Kingdom of Naples. Because of his services and his poverty, the Council of Italy proposed to give him in Naples five hundred scudi at once. King Philip II of Spain accepted the Council's proposal and communicated it to the viceroy of Naples, Pedro Afán de Ribera. However Giovanni received the payment only after three years, when he asked the king again.

Giovanni moved with his family from the Kingdom of Naples to Corfu. Around 1589-1590, at the request of his relative Pietro Renesi, Giovanni went to Cyprus to participate in an assembly where he met three bishops and other personalities of the island. The assembly decided to encourage Giovanni to send king Philip II of Spain a petition for help to fight against the Ottoman Empire.
