= Battle of Fundina =

1876 battle of the Montenegrin–Turkish War

- Part of Montenegrin–Ottoman War (1876–1878)
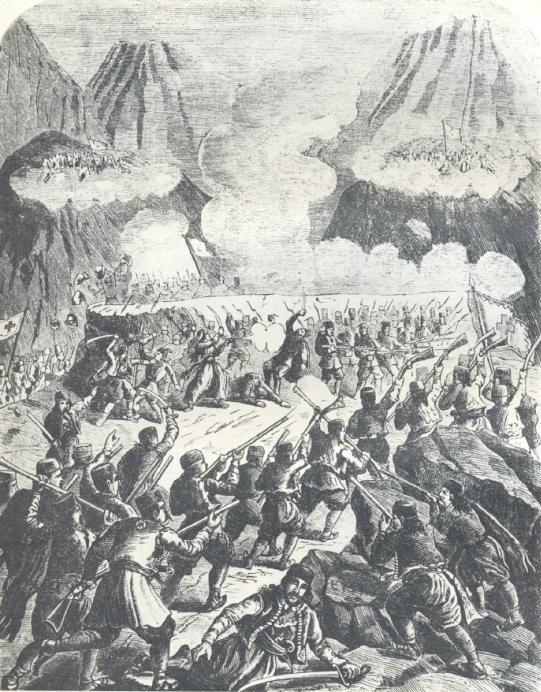
- Depiction of the Battle of Fundina
Date	2 August 1876
Location	Fundina, Montenegro 42.4506°N 19.3654°E
Result	Montenegrin victory

Belligerents
Montenegro	Ottoman Empire

Commanders and leaders
Ilija Plamenac; Marko Miljanov Popović	(Ottoman Empire) Mahmud Pasha

Strength
4,100	50,000 or 40,000

Casualties and losses
279	More than 10,000
- Location of Fundina

The Battle of Fundina took place on 2 August 1876 in Fundina, a village in Kuči, Principality of Montenegro. The day had a religious importance, as being the St. Elijah's Day (Eastern Orthodox calendar).

== Background ==
The Montenegrin Army was led by the two Montenegrin voivodes (or dukes) Ilija Plamenac, who had 2,100 men under his command, and Marko Miljanov, who had 1,800 men all of which were from the Kuci tribe. The Ottomans had a total strength of 40,000. Days before the battle, a Montenegrin Muslim, Mašo-Hadži Ahmetov revealed the Ottoman plans to Marko Miljanov, and thus the Montenegrins knew where the attack was going to come from.

Marko informed Ilija Plamenac about the plan of the Ottomans, who immediately came to Kuči upon invitation. The two voivodes agreed to invite all Montenegrin voivodes and officers to Kuči, after which they gathered the army. In Fundina, the Turks were faced by the battalions of several Montenegrin tribes at that time, like Kuči, Martinići, Bratonožići, Ceklin, Ljubotinja and others. Around two hundred soldiers from Zatrijepac also came to the aid of the Kuči. The Turkish army at Kuči was led by Mahmud Pasha, whose arrival was preceded by the dismissal of Ahmed Hamdi Pasha. Mahmud Pasha led a regular Turkish army to Fundina.

== Battle ==
On August 2, 1876, the dawn broke, in which the deployed guards of Montenegrin soldiers in Fundina awaited the enemy. At dawn, Turks were advancing towards them. Most of them were coming from the direction of Podgorica and Dinoša; reportedly, no single Turkish soldier was moving towards Kuči from Albanian territory. Otherwise, if they had, there would have been a good man in Albania to inform about the Turkish plans for Kuci. Advancing towards Fundina, the Turkish army was building fortifications. They planned to attack Kuči on the third of August, so the defense had to get ahead of the Turks.

The Ottoman army was well armed with rifles, sabers, and dervish axes, while the Montenegrin army was poorly armed with yatagans, (Note: Among cold weapons used in the Dinaric area, the most common are jatagans—knives with a longer curved or straight blade and a handle with "ears" that resemble the spread wings of a butterfly. In the Battle of Fundina, Montenegrins used two types of jatagans in the battle: bjelosapci (white-tailed) and crnosapci (black-tailed). The former was made out of yellow bone, while the latter was made out of black horn.) flintlock pistols and a small number of flintlock rifles and numbered only about five thousand soldiers.

Reportedly, Marko Miljanov climbed onto the observation post, took off his Montenegrin cap, placed it on his chest and said:

“Here, God, let me pray to you one more time and I will not bother you anymore.”

The Ottomans advanced from the Southwest towards Kuči, planning their final attack for 3 August, but since Montenegrin commanders knew of their plans, they counterattacked a day before. Reportedly, around 13:00, the Montenegrin army attacked the Turks, who intended to sleep that night and attack Kuči rested. A battle was fought at the foot of the Heljam hill. Above Fundina, a great roar and the clash of khanjars could be heard.

Most of the fighting occurred at the foot of Heljam hill, where the Ottomans were defending from the trenches. While Marko Miljanov was in the front lines, Ilija Plamenac was commanding the Montenegrin army from the back, developing a strategy. In the Rašović Kuča tower, they imprisoned and burned the Turkish agas and beys. According to the legend, which is still told today, when viewed from the direction of Podgorica, while the tower was burning, various colors rose to the sky. Now there is a memorial at that place. Supposedly, there are still ditches built of stone from that period throughout Fundina. Until recently, when plowing the fields, villagers would find buried heads, which were buried shallowly in small wooden boxes at that time.

The rest of the Montenegrins chased the remaining Ottomans southward towards Ćemovsko polje and Dinoša, forcing them into a fast retreat. The exact number of Montenegrin casualties is unknown, but it is certain that the Ceklin battalion suffered the greatest losses. The most successful part of the Montenegrin Army was the Martinići battalion, which killed 2,000 Ottomans via decapitation and captured 6 enemy flags. The pennant Novak Milošev Vujošević cut off 74 Turkish heads with his dagger. From the Russian emperor, the hero Novak Milošev, from the Kuči tribe, received a yatagan with jewels, on which it is written, "Whoever fights, I cut him down, and whoever does not, I leave him."

== Aftermath ==
The importance of this Montenegrin victory was that it stopped the Ottoman advance and secured the Montenegrin victory during the first half of the Montenegrin–Turkish War of 1876–1878.

At the mills under Fundina, the voivodes Ilija Plamenac and Marko Miljanov met to congratulate each other on the victory. The Montenegrin army, exhausted from the battle, gathered on the hill and under the hundred-year-old elms next to the numerous spring waters in the villages of Premići, Rašovići, and Ljuhari. The soldiers from Malissori (also known as Malësia) who helped the Montenegrins in this battle congratulated the Kuči on the decoration, which King Nikola Petrović presented to them in front of his army, and congratulated them on the second of August.

On August 3, 1876, Marko Miljanov gathered his army at Rano Brdo in the village of Rašovići in Fundina to count the dead and wounded fighters. Of all the Montenegrin battalions, the Ceklin had the most killed and wounded. The number of Turks killed was over ten thousand, or twice the number of Montenegrin soldiers who defended Kuči.

After the battle, Marko Miljanov sent a "gift" to Mahmud Pasha—a live wolf captured during the battle, symbolizing Montenegrin pride and freedom. After the battle at Fundina, the Montenegrin army paid tribute to Duke Marko Miljanov by giving him the most beautiful Turkish saber seized from the battle and the house in Medun, where the Turkish court had operated before the battle, which is today a museum. The army gave serdar Škrnje Kusovac a horse that a Turkish officer rode into battle with. After the battle, the Kuči clan was awarded a medal for bravery by King Nicholas I.

Many Montenegrins broke the seized flintlock rifles after the battles. This was because the Turks had hidden gold coins in them, which led to many of them being found by the Montenegrins. The rifles themselves were of great value because they were richly decorated with gold, silver and nacre. According to the memories of the fighters from the Battle of Fundina, Marko Bojov Rašović, an officer in the army of King Nikola, from the village of Rašovići in Fundina, made a military map that depicts the strategy of the war at that time.

== See also ==
- Montenegrin-Turkish War of 1876-1878
- Battle of Vučji Do
- Principality of Montenegro
- Marko Miljanov Popović

== Sources ==
- Wyon, Reginald; Prance, Gerald (1903). The Land of the Black Mountain: The Adventures of Two Englishmen in Montenegro. London, Methuen & Co. p. 76.
- William H. Guttenberg; History becomes alive
- "Herojstvo u priči potomaka (Heroism in the stories of descendants)". Dan (in Serbian). 7 January 2006.
- Stefan, Vladislav Alexander (2008). My Passion. ISBN 9781889545936.
