= Tomo P. Oraovac =

Serbian writer

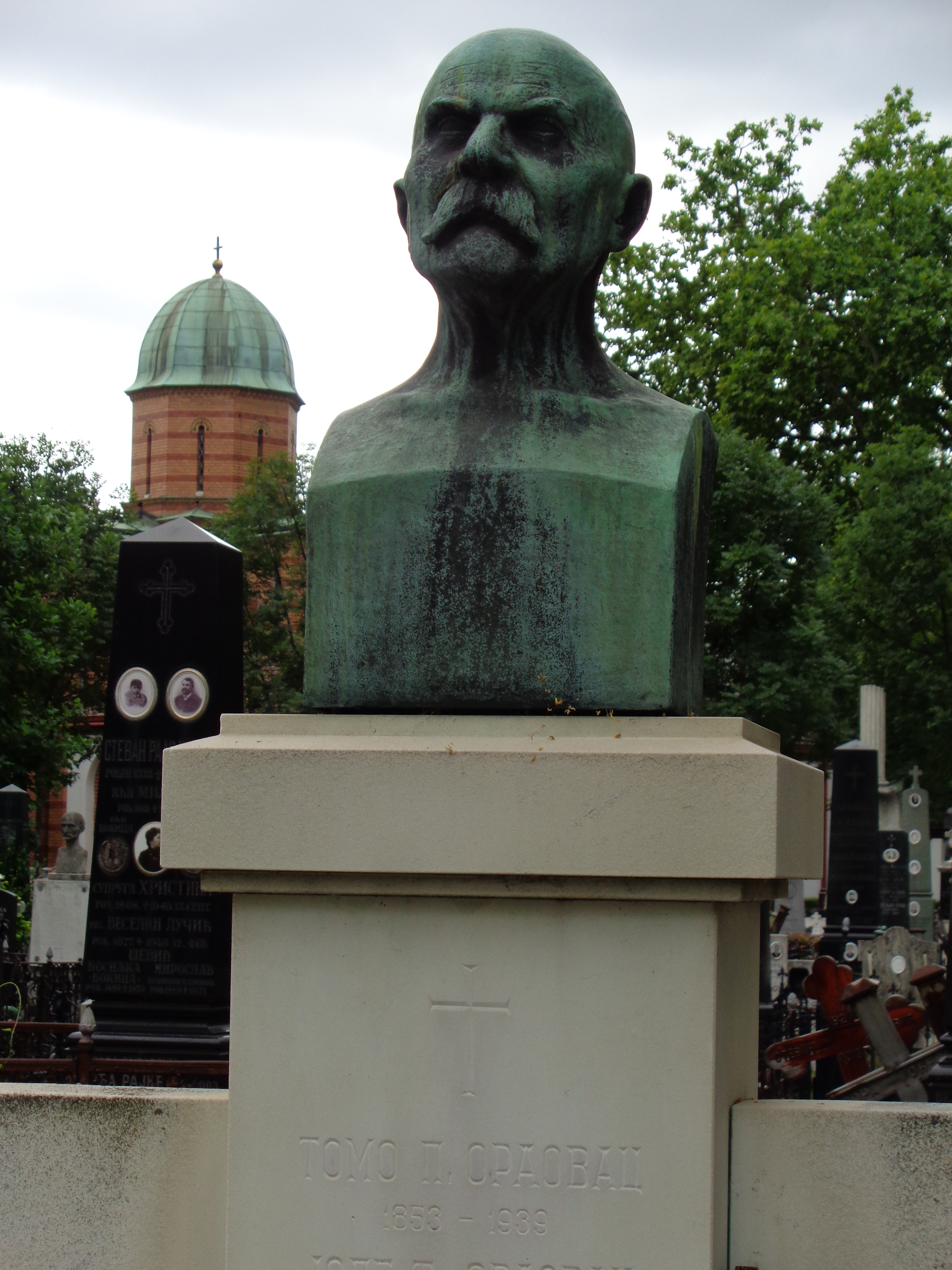
Bust of Oraovac at his grave in Belgrade

Tomo P. Oraovac (Oraovo, Principality of Montenegro, 6 October 1853 – Belgrade, Kingdom of Yugoslavia, 3 March 1939) was a Serbian writer, poet, publicist, fighter for constitutional freedoms in Montenegro, Inspector of the Ministry of Finance and Member of Parliament.

== Biography ==
He was born in the village of Oraovo in Kuči, Montenegro, on 6 October 1853 (Julian Calendar).

He belonged to the first generation of Serbs who studied at the School of Theology in Cetinje (1869-1872). After completing his education, he worked as a teacher, in Danilovgrad, then in Cetinje, where he quickly became its principal. Initiated the convening of the first assembly of Montenegrin teachers, in which he advocated uniform instruction and abolition of corporal punishment in schools.

During the Great War, he performed significant duties in the supply of food to Serbian refugees from Herzegovina. In 1876, Prince Nicholas appointed him Chief Administrator for the reception of food and aid from Imperial Russia. He received high honours for his services to the Montenegrin people. He was appointed Chief Intendant at Bar, where he remained until 1881. He initiated the establishment of the Bar Reading Room, supported by the most respected citizens, and, along with other prominent and free-spirited Montenegrins, launched a movement to establish a democratic and parliamentary regime.

Because Oraovac was opposed to the absolutist regime of Prince Nikola, he was expelled from Montenegro in 1883 and was forced to move to the Kingdom of Serbia.

There he served as a clerk in the police and in the Ministry of Finance. He worked as the District Chief, Taxman, Comptroller and Inspector in the Ministry of Finance, and remained in this position until his retirement, after fifty years of civil service.

Between the two world wars he was a member of Radical Parties that was led by Stojan Protić. He was a member of the Society for the Study of the History of Montenegro as its president and lecturer.

He was involved in scholastic and literary activity and publicity. When he was young he began to write lyric and epic poetry. Some of his songs, which were produced during his time in Montenegro, became very popular.

He wrote about the Cetinje Monastery and the centuries-old independence of Montenegro in the Zeta Gazette (Zetski glasnik). Before his death, he prepared to print "Famous Montenegrins", which was published posthumously the following year.

== Works ==
=== Books ===
- "Three Famous Herzegovinians", Belgrade (1908)
- "The Arbanassi Question and Serbian Law", Belgrade (1913)
- "The Anathema of Lovčen", Geneva (1918)
- "Duke Tripko Džaković", Cetinje (1935)
- "War on Lake Skadar: Conquering the City of Zabljak", Belgrade (1935)
- "Famous Montenegrins", Zemun (1940)

=== Articles ===
- "Property of the Cetinje Monastery, Ivan Beg's Testament", Zetski glasnik, Cetinje 8/1936, no. 33-2.
- "On the Centenary of the Independence of Montenegro", Zetski glasnik, 7/1935, no. 1-4, 4-5.

== See also ==
- Marko Miljanov
- Tripko Džaković

== Works cited ==
- Ђ., Т. (March 4, 1939). "Tomo P. Oraovac" Томо П. Ораовац. Politika. Belgrade. p. 13.
- Ratković, Milenko (2016). Anegdote o Piscima Анегдоте о писцима (PDF). Bar, Montenegro.
