= Tripko Džaković =

Tripko Džaković (c. 1838 – October 30, 1875) was a Montenegrin Serb voivode who fought in many battles against Ottoman Turks.

In 1852 he participated in the fighting with Pljevlja Turks near Bistrica, where he was wounded twice. During the Montenegrin-Ottoman War from 1861 to 1862, he distinguished himself by his heroism and was a tribal Bayraktar. He was recognized by the Turks as the elder of the Tribes of Montenegro, particularly the tribes of Šaranci and Jezera after the demarcation in 1859. He was appointed tribal duke of great merit.

During the Herzegovina uprising in 1875, with a detachment of 500 armed men, he defended the crossing over Tara near the village of Premčan, where he was killed in battle.

== Literature ==
- Military Encyclopedia, Belgrade, 1971, book two, pp. 599.
- Tomo P. Oraovac, "Voivode Tripko Džaković", Belgrade, 1935

== See also ==
- Ilija Plamenac
- Gavro Vučković Krajišnik
- Marko Miljanov
- Joaksim Knežević
- Božo Petrović-Njegoš
