= Baćović =

Baćović (Cyrillic script: Баћовић) is a Serbo-Croatian surname. Notable people with the surname include:

- Petar Baćović (1898–1945), Bosnian Serb Chetnik leader
- Simo Baćović (1828–1911), Montenegrin voivode
- Vasilije Baćović
