= Janko Jolović =

Yugoslav partisan (1897–1942)

- Born: January 14, 1897; Bandin Odžak, Glasinac plateau, Bosnia and Herzegovina
- Died: September 1942 (aged 45) Bandin Odžak, near Rogatica, Bosnia and Herzegovina
- Allegiance: Yugoslav Partisans
- Branch: Partisan resistance
- Rank: Political leader
- Commands: Regional National Liberation Committee, Rogatica
- Conflicts: World War II in Yugoslavia
- Other work: Forest workers' organizer, political activist

Janko Jolović (January 14, 1897 in Bandin Odžak - September 1942), was a Yugoslav partisan and the first president of the Regional National Liberation Committee in Rogatica.

== Biography ==
=== Early life ===
Janko was born on January 14, 1897, in Bandin Odžak on Glasinac plateau near Sarajevo. He comes from a working class but wealthy family. After the First World War, he married Ljubica, with whom he had a daughter, Jela, and three sons.↵Several members of the Jolović family were members of the Serbian volunteer units in Russia and on the Thessaloniki front. Janko's older brother, Milivoje Jolović, participated in the October Revolution as a Red Army fighter. After returning from Russia in 1923, he tried to convince Janko to flee to Russia, where the proletariat is in power. Janko refused and remained in his country, working and later fighting for workers and peasants' wellbeing.

=== Public and political engagements ===
At the outset of the Second World War, Janko was among the first partisans fighting Germans, with a goal of defense and ultimately liberation of people regardless of their religion and ethnicity.

He is listed as a member of the leadership of the KPJ and SKOJ in Sokolac - as part of the organ of the revolutionary movement before the armed uprising. Janko's party task was to organize forest workers in Romanija. On that occasion, Hasan Brkić stayed with him on several occasions, with whom he arranged the organization of URS woodworkers' unions.

The following were chosen for the headquarters of the Romanija company, which had to expel the Ustashe and gendarmes from the region: Slaviša Vajner Čiča (company commander), Pavle Goranin Ilija (commissioner), Oskar Danon Jovo (assistant commander), Danilo Đokić (assistant commander), Slobodan Princip, Mihailo Obrenović and Brnako Milutinović "Obren" (staff members).

Janko and Čiča organized gatherings in Bandina Odžak and invited people from all the villages of Glasinac to join the company. Janko visited Serbian, Croatian and Muslim villages, organized village guards, listed volunteers and assigned them to Čiča's company.

In August 1941, he participated in the liberation of Sokolac, Vlasenica and surrounding towns. In September of the same year, the free territory extended from Romanija all the way to the Drina. Soon after that, the KPJ District Committee was formed in Romanija, of which Janko was a member.

The liberation of Rogatica followed. The attack lasted until 16–23. October, when native and Ustasha troops were expelled from Rogatica. Immediately after the liberation, Janko approached the formation of the County NOO, whose president he was elected at the suggestion of Slaviša Vajner.

=== Capture and death ===
In the spring of 1942, Janko retreated with the people from Foča towards the Piva. However, the supreme headquarters in Vrbnica made a decision that all units from Romanija would break through back to their terrain and continue the fight. Groups started to break through as soon as they were ready to move. Janko led a larger group of people with several fighters to Romanija. When they arrived in the village of Borija, they were surrounded by Chetniks. All fighters surrendered to protect the people. A group of about fifteen partisans from Romanija was taken to the forest towards Borija for shooting, but the shooting was abandoned at the last moment, so they were handed over to the Ustashe authorities in Trnovo. The Ustashe took them from Trnovo to prison in Sarajevo. Janko was soon returned to Rogatica by the Ustaše, where he was imprisoned in the Regional Government (the place where his Regional People's Committee is also located). After the intervention of the people of Rogatica, Janko was released from prison.

During the night of September 11, he was caught in a shepherd's hut on Bandina Odžak, by the Chetnik Dobrica Đukić and his Chetnik group. The Chetniks wounded his wife Ljubica by stabbing her multiple times with a bayonets, and Janko was kept tied to a spruce tree for four days. On the fifth day, Dobrica Đukić and Dušan Vuković took him under the Romanija Cliffs, a steep karstic rock face featuring a deep jama (cave) called Zvek or Bezdan, they tortured him and threw him alive into the pit.

== Legacy ==
A street in the Sarajevo neighborhood of Dobrinja bears his name.
