= Ilija Plamenac =

Montenegrin vojvoda and military commander

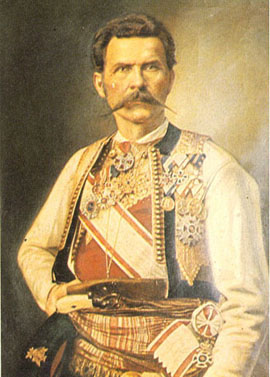

1st Minister of War of Principality of Montenegro
- In office 20 March 1879 – 19 December 1905
- Monarch: Nicholas I
- President of the State Council: Božo Petrović-Njegoš
- Preceded by: Position established
- Succeeded by: Janko Vukotić

1st Mayor of Podgorica
- In office 1879–1886
- Preceded by: Position established
- Succeeded by: Luka Nenezić

Personal details
- Born: 16 July 1821 Boljevići, Crmnica, Montenegro
- Died: 6 March 1916 (aged 95)
- Occupation: Military leader, politician

Ilija Plamenac (Serbian Cyrillic: Илија Пламенац; 1821 – 6 March 1916) was a Montenegrin vojvoda and military commander during the Montenegrin–Ottoman Wars of 1862 and 1876–1878. After his victory in the key Battle of Fundina in 1876, he served as Minister of Defence under King Nikola for more than 25 years.

== Early life and ancestry ==
Ilija Plamenac was born in 1821 in Boljevići, in the region of Crmnica in Monetengro. His father Mihailo Plamenac was a priest.

Ilija gained basic literacy in Boljevići, before continuing his elementary education in Cetinje Monastery. He studied under Dimitrije Milaković for over two years. When Milaković was dispatched to St. Petersburg by the Price-Bishop Petar II Petrović-Njegoš, Plamenac studied under Đorđije Petrović-Njegoš. During this time, he witnessed Njegoš's negotiations with Herzegovinian vizier Ali-paša Rizvanbegović in Dubrovnik, during the Battle of Grahovo in 1836.

As a young man, Plamenac was ordained in 1843. After serving as a priest for nearly a decade, he became a tribal captain under the rule of Prince Danilo in 1851.

Ilija was related to Jovan Plamenac, leader of the True People's Party.

== Military command ==
=== Battles of Murići and Krnjice (1861–1862) ===
In the run-up to the Montenegrin–Ottoman War of 1862, Plamenac, a tribal captain at the time, was ordered by Prince Nikola to attack Skadarska Krajina, namely the villages of Murići and Šestani, starting the Battle of Murići. The attack was to open a new front against the Ottomans, with the intent of easing pressure on the Uprising in Herzegovina. The villages were easily occupied in November 1861 by a unit of Crmnica tribesmen.

The Ottoman government responded immediately, and ordered the mobilization of around 3,000 men with the intent to recapture the occupied areas. Plamenac was ordered to retreat from Murići and Šestani, and leave a smaller force in the villages of Krnjice and Seoca. The Ottomans responded with an ultimatum, demanding the Montenegrin forces retreat from the two villages and threatening war. Prince Nikola acquiesced to their demands, with the condition of a general amnesty for all those from the villages involved in the attack on Skadarska Krajina. Having received confirmation of the amnesty, he ordered Plamenac to retreat with his forces in February 1862.

The local populace mostly retreated from Krnjice fearing reprisals. However, a group of men from Krnjice under the command of captain Kola Petrov Lukić barricaded themselves in Gornje Krnjice. An Ottoman unit led by Hasan Hot attacked Petrov's forces. A unit from Crmnica led by Plamenac, as well as a detachment of several thousand Montenegrins led by Petar Vujović went to the aid of Petrov's men. The Battle of Krnjice ended in a victory for Montenegro and was used as casus belli by the Ottomans leading to the Montenegrin–Ottoman War of 1862 which raged from April to August. During the war, Ilija Plamenac was stationed near the border with Skadarska Krajina in a unit led by vojvoda Mašo Đurović.

=== Senator and diplomat ===
After the war, Prince Nikola appointed Plamenac to the Administrative Senate of Montenegro and the Highlands. He was to replace his uncle, Turo Stevov Plamenac, who had died in the Battle of Meterizi in August 1862. Simultaneously, Ilija became a vojvoda.

Plamenac was designated to lead a diplomatic mission to Constantinople in 1866. His goal was to negotiate property laws, the occupation of several de jure Montenegrin villages, and the building of forts near Montenegro after the Montenegrin-Ottoman war of 1862. Plamenac arrived in Constantinople in mid 1866, and handed a memorandum on Montenegrin-Ottoman territorial issues to Mehmed Emin Âli Pasha, the Foreign Minister.

Disheartened with the time Âli Pasha kept him waiting, Plamenac spoke to the Grand Vizier Mehmed Rushdi Pasha. The Grand Vizier arranged a meeting with Sultan Abdülaziz and a mixed commission was established. Vojvoda Ilija Plamenac and captain Pero Jokašev Pejović, his translator, represented Montenegro. The commission worked up to September 1866 and ended on a positive note for the Montenegrins. The Ottoman Empire agreed to retreat from the disputed village of Novo Selo, take down its fort on the Visočica near Spuž and hand over Velje Brdo and Malo Brdo with the condition that its populace continue to pay taxes to the Sanjak of Scutari. The agreement was signed on 26 October 1866.

Plamenac travelled to Saint Petersburg and Berlin in 1869 with Prince Nikola, Belgrade in January 1871 and Vienna in 1874. Most of these travels concerned procuring military equipment, since his task as Senator was the reorganization and modernization of the army of Montenegro.

=== Montenegrin–Ottoman War of 1876–1878 ===
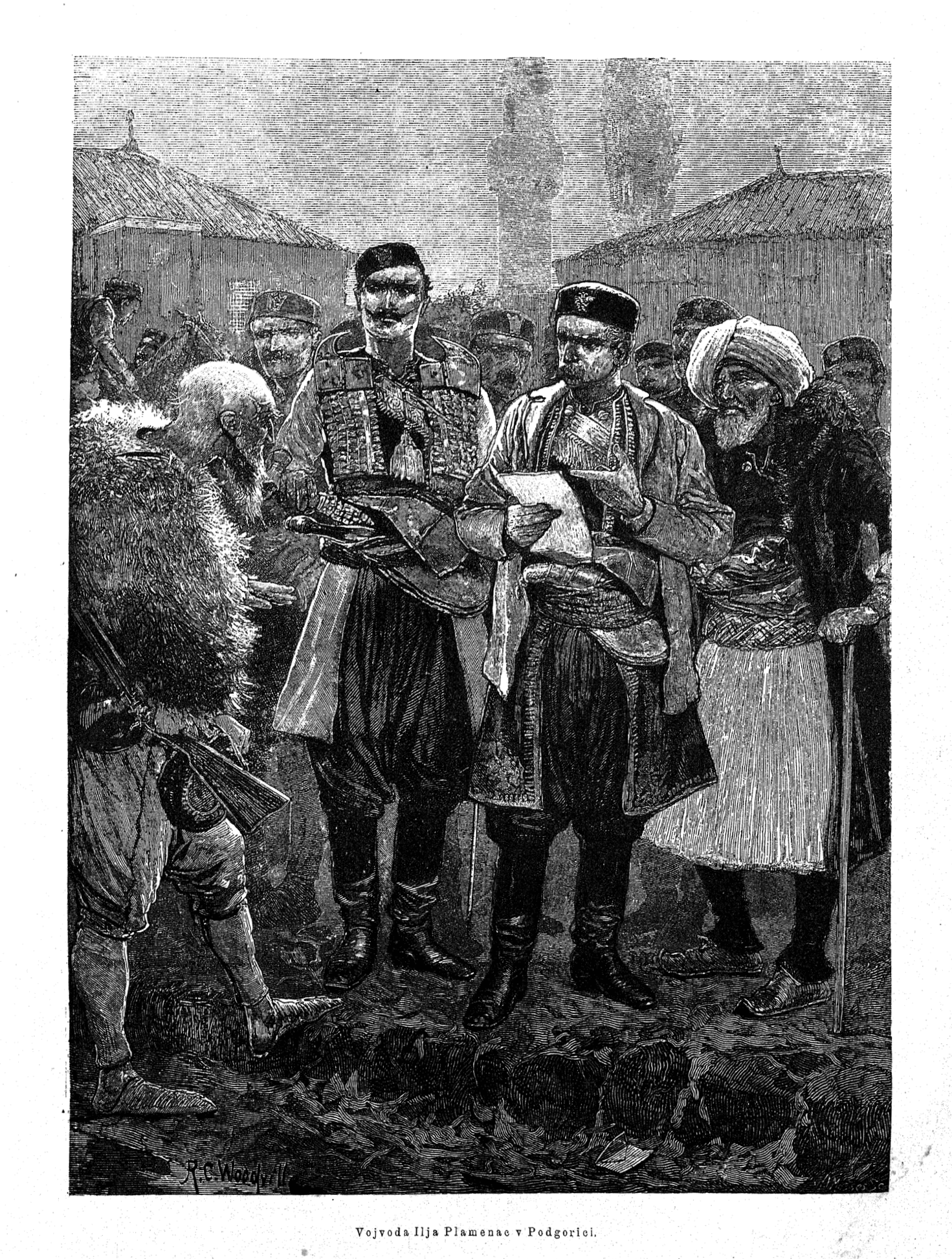
Ilija Plamenac enters Podgorica in the aftermath of the war in 1879, woodcut by Richard Caton Woodville Jr.

At the beginning of the Montenegrin–Ottoman War of 1876–1878, Plamenac was appointed commander of a unit consisting of three battalions and one highland battery. Around 2,000 men were placed under his command. His unit was part of the Southern Army under the command of Božo Petrović-Njegoš.

Countering movements by the Ottoman army, Plamenac stationed his troops in the village of Fundina in Kuči in August 1876. The ensuing Battle of Fundina ended in an astounding victory for the Montenegrins, and turned the tide of the war. Together with Marko Miljanov Popović, Plamenac led a force of less than 5,000 men and defeated an Ottoman army of around 20,000 men under Mahmud Pasha with heavy casualties for the Ottomans. After Ilija's success in the Battle at Maljat in October 1876, the two sides signed a truce that lasted until April 1877 when the Russo-Turkish War started.

In early June 1877 the Ottoman advance was halted at the Battle of Martinići. In late July, Plamenac led a force that participated in the Siege of Nikšić. Following the liberation of Nikšić, the troops under Plamenac moved to Virpazar, from where they intended to cross the mountain of Sutorman and take hold of the area between Bar and Ulcinj. At first, their mission was to halt the arrival of reinforcements from Ulcinj and Shkodra that intended to break the Siege of Bar. In early November 1877, Plamenac took the region of Mrkojevići with heavy casualties for the Ottomans, and from there staged an attack on Možura hill, north of Ulcinj. His unit defeated an Ottoman unit of around 2,000 men on Možura, and got in position to attack Ulcinj from that place. In early 1878, the troops under Plamenac stormed Ulcinj suffering heavy casualties.

In the aftermath of the war, Plamenac became commander of the Littoral and Skadarska Krajina, two regions acquired by Montenegro following the Congress of Berlin. The troops under Plamenac and Božo Petrović-Njegoš took Spuž, Velje Brdo, Malo Brdo and Podgorica in 1879. Plamenac became the first Mayor of Podgorica. After negotiations with the authorities of the Sanjak of Scutari, Plamenac took the regions of the Gruda and Hoti in late 1880.

== Political career ==
In 1879, with the formation of the new Government of Montenegro, the Ministry and the State Council, Plamenac served as the Minister of Defence of the Principality of Montenegro. He served in the Cabinet of Božo Petrović-Njegoš from 1879 to 1905, and as the first Mayor of Podgorica from 1879 to 1886.

With the advent of parliamentarianism and more capable Western-schooled political elites, Plamenac became increasingly sidelined. His place in government was a mostly symbolic position. He was replaced after the entry into force of the liberal Constitution of Montenegro in 1905. After this, he would go on to write his memoirs, mostly centered on refuting claims of cowardice and poor leadership in the Battle of Fundina laid out against him by his former compatriot Marko Miljanov.

== Honours ==
Ilija Plamenac received the Ottoman Order of the Medjidie Third Class from Mehmed Emin Âli Pasha following their successful negotiations in 1866. He received the Russian Order of Saint Anna Second Class during his trip to Saint Petersburg with Prince Nikola in 1869, and Order of St. George Fourth Class on 12 April 1877. Upon visiting Prussia in 1869, Plamenac received the Order of the Crown Second Class. He was also awarded the Serbian Order of the Cross of Takovo and Medal for Bravery as well as other Italian, Bulgarian, French and Austrian orders.
