= Milica Miljanov =

Montenegrin soldier (c. 1860 – 1950)

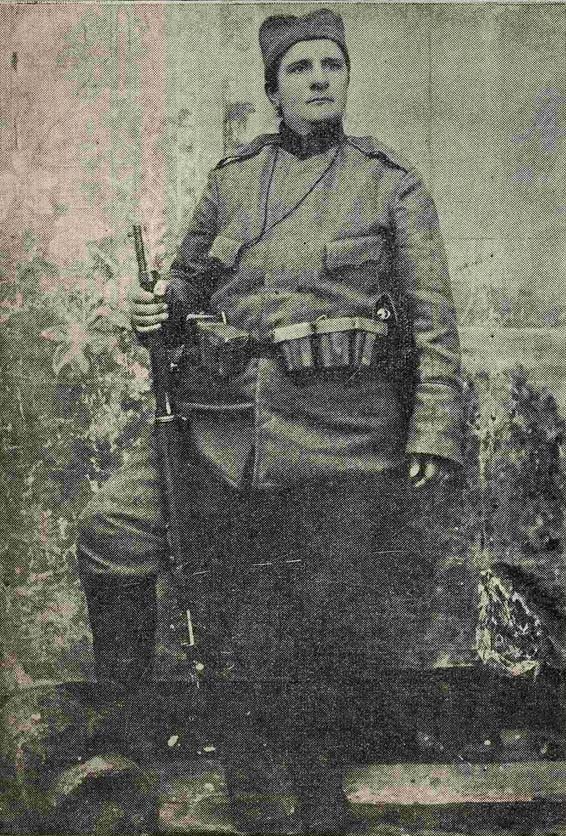
Milica Miljanov

Milica Markova Popović (Serbian Cyrillic: Милица Маркова Поповић; c. 1860 – 1950) was a Serb soldier and war heroine from Montenegro famous for her participation in the first and second Balkan wars and World War I. She was on active service at an age when even men were relieved from active duty, and fought across the Balkan warfront. Her daughter was Olgivanna Lloyd Wright, wife and associate of American architect, Frank Lloyd Wright.

== Biography ==
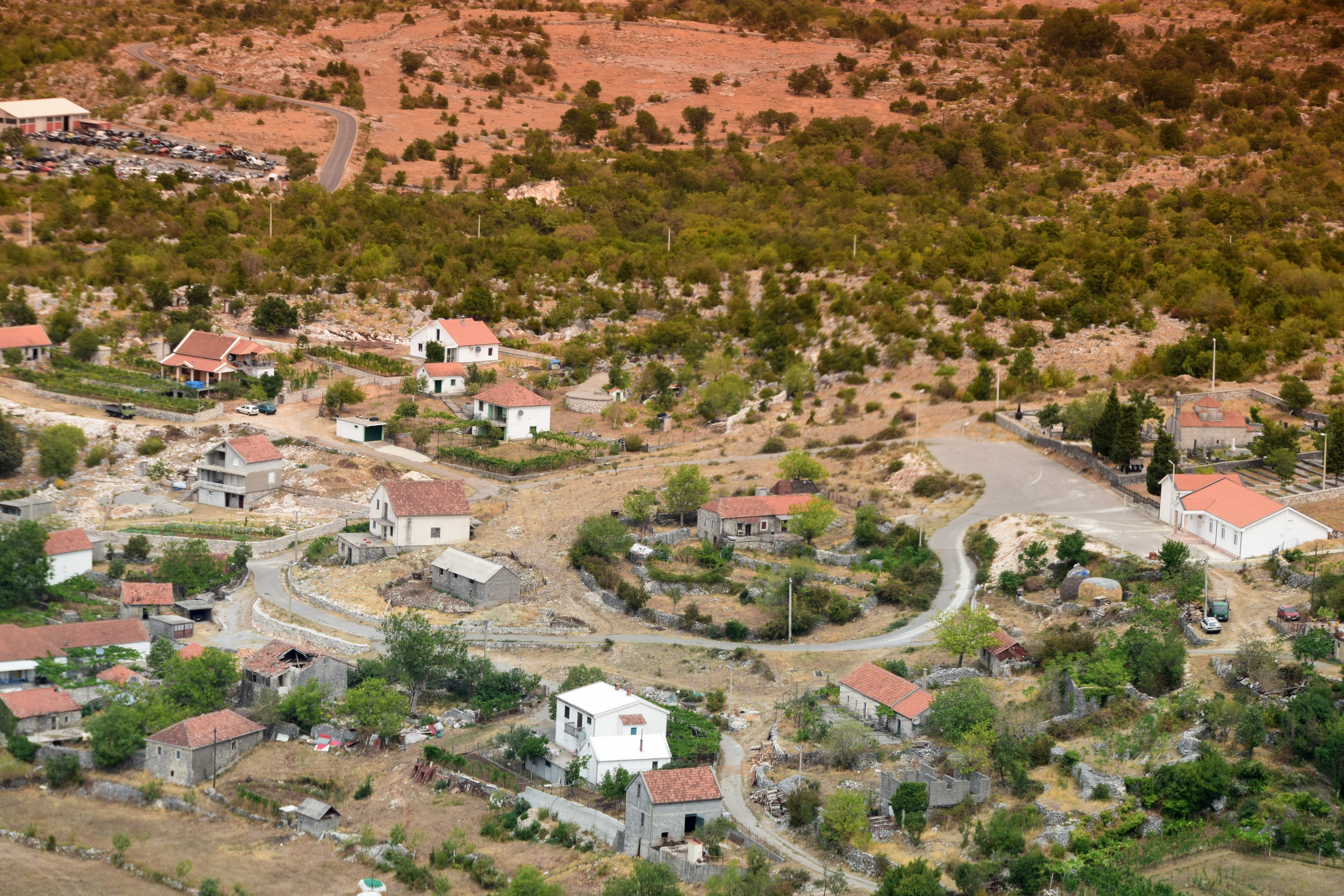
Medun, the birthplace of Milica Miljanov

Milica Miljanov was born in Medun, around 1860. She was one of three daughters of the Montenegrin duke, Marko Miljanov. She married Ivan Lazović.

Her father had no sons, so her older sister Andjelija accompanied him in the historic Battle of Fundina in 1876. Milica Miljanov volunteered in the army decades later, in 1914, as a mother and at an age when even men are relieved from active duty, fighting all across the Balkan war front. Unlike other women, for instance Antonija Javornik, who joined the army, she did not change her identity and name, and was able to fight as a woman till the end of the war.

Her daughter, Olga, born in 1898, was a writer, dancer, composer, philosopher and teacher, who was remembered as Olgivanna Lloyd Wright, the wife and associate of the American architect, Frank Lloyd Wright.

== Legacy ==
The role of women in World War I was reflected in the monodrama „Čelične ratnice - Žene dobrovoljci u Prvom svetskom ratu” ("Steel Warriors - Women's Volunteers in the First World War"), which was held in December 2014 at the Historical Museum of Serbia, in the accompanying program of the exhibition "Serbia 2014", as well as on other occasions in subsequent years. This monodrama transmits the testimonies of women who, as warriors, volunteer nurses or humanitarian workers, took part in World War I. Among the numerous testimonies is the story of Miljanova. The text is based on original records, authentic statements, and passages from the biographies of women warriors of World War I.
