= Simo Baćović =

Montenegrin military leader

Simo Baćović (Serbian Cyrillic: Симо Баћовић; 1828 – 4 September 1911) was a Montenegrin voivode born in Banjani.

He was a general of the rebels during the Vukalović's Uprising, he blockaded Ottoman garrisons in cities of Trebinje and Gacko. He also commanded Montenegrin divisions during Herzegovina uprising and Montenegrin–Ottoman War (1876–1878). He led his division to victory in Battle of Vučji Do.
