= Krstaš-barjak =

The krstaš-barjak (Serbian: крсташ-барјак, lit. 'Crusader flag'; from krstaš, "crusader", barjak, "flag, banner") refers to various war flags with crosses in the centre, part of Serb tradition, originating from medieval military flags. It is known that Serbian Emperor Stefan Dušan (r. 1331–55) adopted the Byzantine cross flag (divellion, which was purple and had a golden cross in the center). According to Serbian epic poetry, during the Ottoman period, hajduks had war flags with crosses (krstaš-barjak) or icons of saints (svetački barjak). The krstaš-barjak is mentioned in poems of the Kosovo Cycle; knight Boško Jugović bears it at the battle of Kosovo (1389).

It was used as the general rebel flag during the Serbian Revolution (1804–17), and as the secondary flag of the supreme commander (Karađorđe 1804–13; Miloš Obrenović 1815–17). It was adopted as a military flag by the Principality of Montenegro (1852–1910) and Kingdom of Montenegro (1910–1918). The Montenegrin war flag used in the Battle of Vučji Do (1876) was red with a white cross pattée in the center and a white border, and tradition holds that it was adopted from the war flag of Kosovo which found itself in Montenegro after surviving knights brought it there. In Peroj (in Istria), it is held that their ancestors (who migrated from Montenegro) had a war flag used at Kosovo in their possession.

The Takovo Uprising (1888), Miloš Obrenović initiating the Second Serbian Uprising (1815–17).

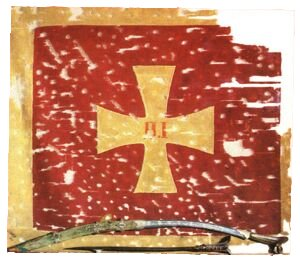
Bullet-ridden war flag from the Montenegrin–Ottoman Battle of Vučji Do (1876).

== See also ==
- Serbian cross

== Annotations ==
1. In Serbian linguist Vuk Karadžić's 1818 dictionary, the krstaš-barjak is translated as German: Die Kreuzfahne and Latin: vexillum cruciatum.

== Sources ==
- Kostić, Lazo M. (1960). O zastavama kod Srba: istoriska razmatranja. Munich.
- Markuš, Jovan B. (2007). Grbovi, zastave i himne u istoriji Crne Gore (PDF). Svetigora. p. 73. ISBN 9788676600540 – via Academia.edu.
- Smodlaka, J. (1933). "Borbe i govor zastava". Nova Evropa. 26 (11): 513–525.
