= Vučji Do =

Vučji Do Вучји До
- Village
- Location within Montenegro
- Country: Montenegro
- Municipality: Nikšić

Population (2011)
  - Total: 22
- Time zone: UTC+1 (CET)
  - Summer (DST): UTC+2 (CEST)

Vučji Do (Montenegrin: Вучји До) is a settlement in the municipality of Nikšić, Montenegro.

== Geography ==
Vučji Do is located near the Montenegro–Bosnia border, c. 6 km east from Bileća.

== History ==
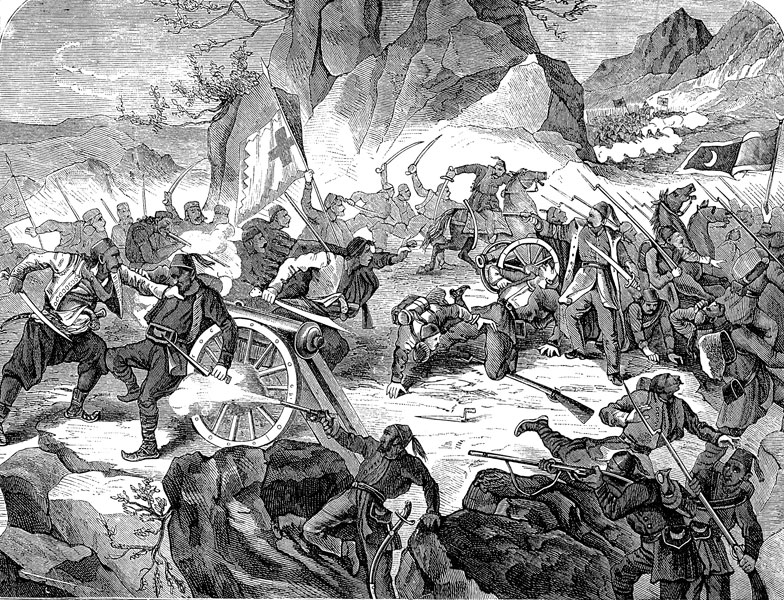
Battle of Vučji Do (18 July 1876).

In the early modern period, the region was part of the Nikšić tribe. Vučji Do was the site of the Battle of Vučji Do (18 July 1876), in which Montenegrin and Herzegovinian battalions defeated the Ottoman army.

== Demographics ==
According to the 2003 census, the total population was 30, 29 of whom were Serbs (96,66%), 1 was Montenegrin (3,33%).

According to the 2011 census, its population was only 22, 18 of them Serbs.

Demographic history
Censuses	1948	1953	1961	1971	1981	1991	2003	2011
Total pop.	105	113	89	80	51	34	30	22
