= Montenegrin–Ottoman War (1876–1878) =

Conflict between the Principality of Montenegro and the Ottoman Empire from 1876 to 1878

Montenegrin–Ottoman War of 1876–1878
- Part of Great Eastern Crisis
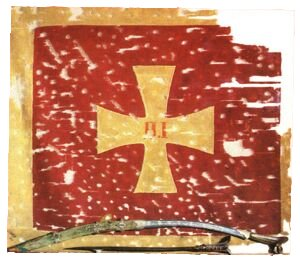
- Montenegrin krstaš-barjak from the Battle of Vučji Do, damaged by bullets from the Ottoman forces, one of the symbols of the war and Montenegrin resistance.
Date	18 June 1876 – 19 February 1878
Location	Principality of Montenegro and Sanjak of Herzegovina
Result	Montenegrin victory: Treaty of San Stefano; Treaty of Berlin
Territorial changes	De jure independence of Montenegro: Montenegro gains the towns of Nikšić, Kolašin, Spuž, Podgorica, Žabljak and Bar increasing Montenegro territory from 4,405 km² to 9,475 km².

Belligerents
Montenegro (Finland) Finnish volunteers	Ottoman Empire

Commanders and leaders
Prince Nicholas I Marko Miljanov Popović; Simo Baćović	Ahmed Muhtar Pasha; Osman Pasha; Mustafa Celalettin Pasha †

The Montenegrin–Ottoman War (Serbian Cyrillic: Црногорско-турски рат, romanized: Crnogorsko-turski rat, "Montenegrin-Turkish War"), also known in Montenegro as the Great War (Вељи рат, Velji rat), was fought between the Principality of Montenegro and the Ottoman Empire between 1876 and 1878. The war ended with Montenegrin victory and Ottoman defeat in the larger Russo-Turkish War of 1877–1878. Six major and 27 smaller battles were fought, among which was the crucial Battle of Vučji Do.

A rebellion in nearby Herzegovina sparked a series of rebellions and uprisings against the Ottomans in Europe. Montenegro and Serbia agreed to declare a war on the Ottomans on 18 June 1876. The Montenegrins allied themselves with Herzegovians. One battle that was crucial to Montenegro's victory in the war was the Battle of Vučji Do. In 1877, Montenegrins fought heavy battles along the borders of Herzegovina and Albania. Prince Nicholas took the initiative and counterattacked the Ottoman forces that were coming from the north, south and west. He conquered Nikšić (24 September 1877), Bar (10 January 1878), Ulcinj (20 January 1878), Grmožur (26 January 1878) and Vranjina and Lesendro (30 January 1878).

The war ended when the Ottomans signed a truce with the Montenegrins at Edirne on 13 January 1878. The advancement of Russian forces toward the Ottomans forced the Ottomans to sign a peace treaty on 3 March 1878, recognising the independence of Montenegro, as well as Romania and Serbia, and also increased Montenegro's territory from 4,405 km^{2} to 9,475 km^{2}. Montenegro also gained the towns of Nikšić, Kolašin, Spuž, Podgorica, Žabljak, Bar, as well as access to the sea.

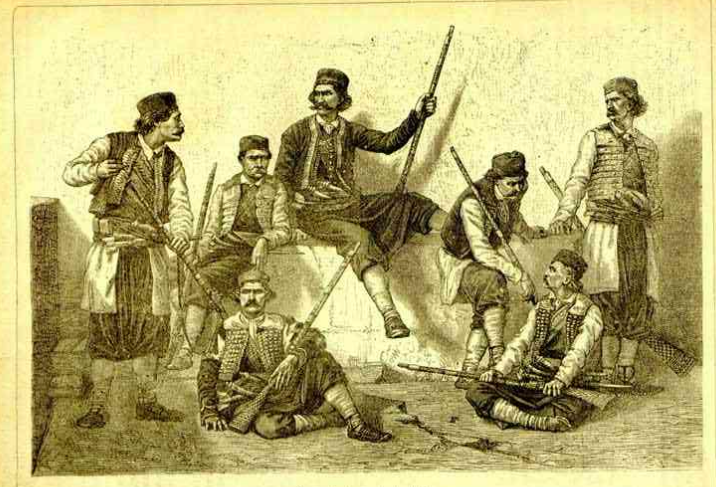
Montenegrin clan chieftains and military commanders on the eve of the war in 1876.

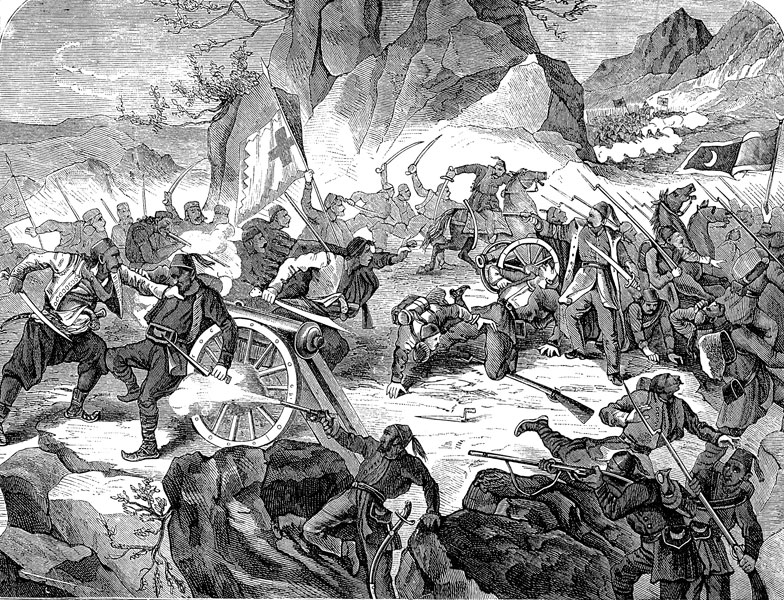
Battle of Vučji Do (18 July 1876).

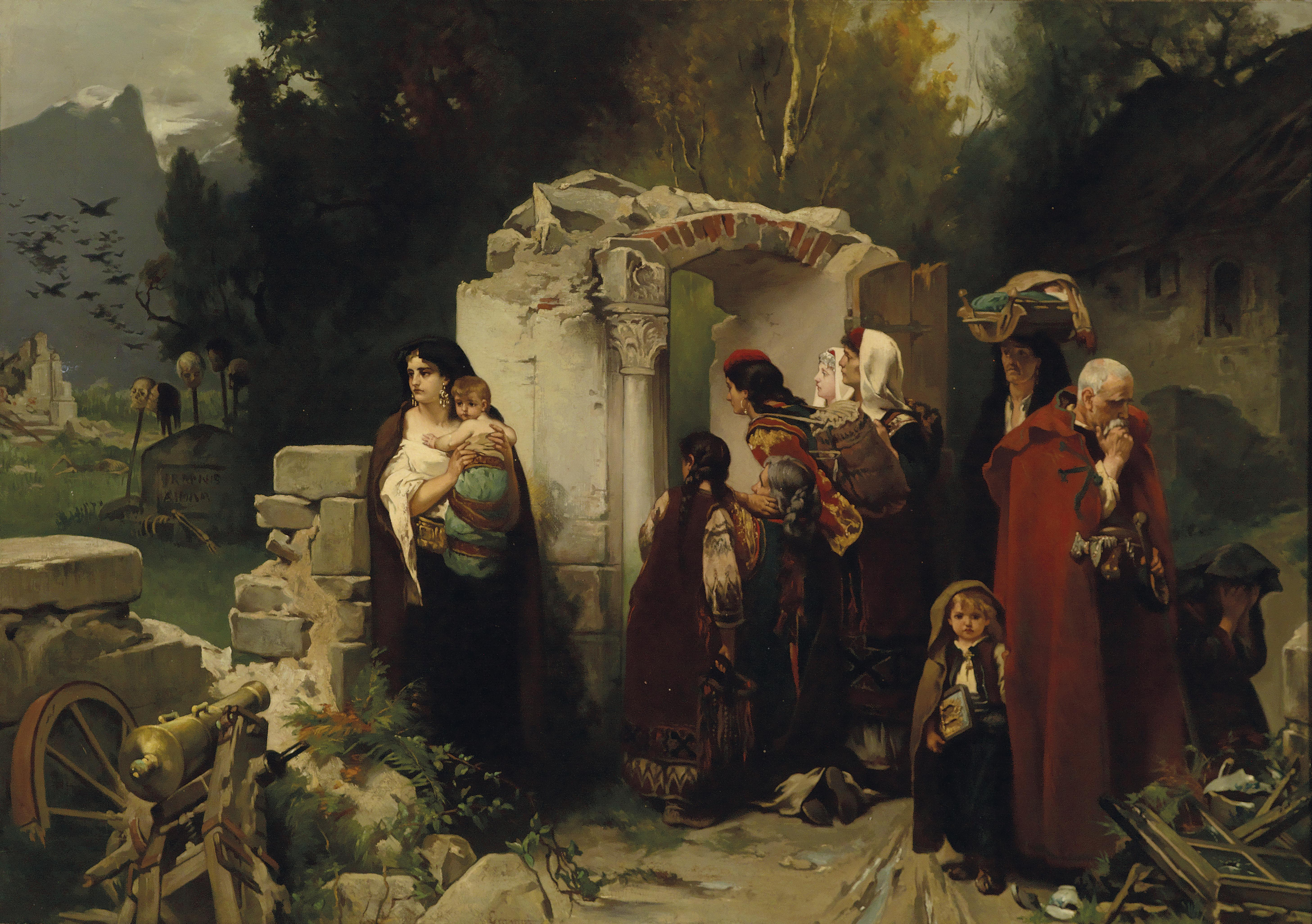
The return of Montenegrin refugees to their home village by Jaroslav Čermák, 1877

== Background ==
In October 1874, an influential Ottoman statesman, Jusuf-beg Mučin Krnjić, was murdered in Podgorica, which at the time was an Ottoman town near the border with Montenegro. It is believed that he had been killed by a close relative of vojvoda Marko Miljanov, a Montenegrin general who also, most likely, instigated the assassination. As a consequence, the Ottomans launched an action of retaliation against the local population and Montenegrin citizens present at the farmers' market in Podgorica, modern-day capital of Montenegro. It is estimated that 17 unarmed Montenegrins had been killed. This event is known as the "Podgorica's slaughter" (Podgorički pokolj). It resulted in bad relations between Montenegro and the Ottoman Empire, which further deteriorated with the outbreak of the uprising in Herzegovina (1875). Montenegro conducted the uprising, providing the rebels with military and financial aid and representing their interests to the Porte. Montenegro requested that part of Herzegovina be handed over to the Montenegrins, but the Porte declined. Because of this, Montenegro declared war on 18 June 1876 (30 June), immediately followed by its foremost ally, the Principality of Serbia.

== War ==
In the beginning of the war, when Miljanov arrived at Kuči, at the Ottoman frontier, the Kuči revolted and attacked the Ottomans. The Pasha filled Medun and other small forts, Fundina, Koći, Zatrijebač and Orahovo with soldiers.

The Piperi and Kuči tribes together attacked Koći, killing a small part, while they found Ottomans in tower houses whom they wanted to destroy with wooden cannons. An epic poem about the war tells how Abdi Pasha the Cherkessian with 20,000 soldiers of the sanjak of Scutari was sent by the sultan to attack the Kuči and Piperi. The poem tells how part of the army advanced on Koći and then fought in Zatrijebač and Fundina.

In the Montenegrin-Ottoman war, the Montenegrin army managed to capture certain areas and settlements along the border, while encountering strong resistance from Albanians in Ulcinj, and a combined Albanian-Ottoman force in the Podgorica-Spuž and Gusinje-Plav regions. At Medun, 20,000 Ottoman soldiers were defeated by 5,000 Montenegrin soldiers, and 4,500 Ottoman soldiers were killed. As such, Montenegro's territorial gains were much smaller. Some Muslims and the Albanian population who lived near the then southern border were expelled from the towns of Podgorica and Spuž. These populations resettled in Shkodër city and its environs.

== Notable battles ==
- Battle of Vučji Do (18 July 1876)
- Battle of Fundina (2 August 1876)

== See also ==
- Battles for Plav and Gusinje (1879–1880)
- Expulsion of the Albanians (1877–1878)
- Herzegovina uprising (1875–1877)
- Montenegrin–Ottoman War (1852–1853)
- Montenegrin–Ottoman War (1861–1862)
- Serbian–Ottoman Wars (1876–1878)
- Yugoslavism

== Sources ==
- Владимир Ћоровић. "Пут на Берлински Конгрес". Историја Срба.
- Спиридон Гопчевић, „Црногорско-турски рат 1876. до 1878. године". Београд 1963
- William James Stillman (1997). Hercegovački ustanak i Crnogorsko-turski rat: 1876-1878. Službeni list SRJ. ISBN 978-86-355-0370-7.
