= Medun =

Medun Медун
- Village
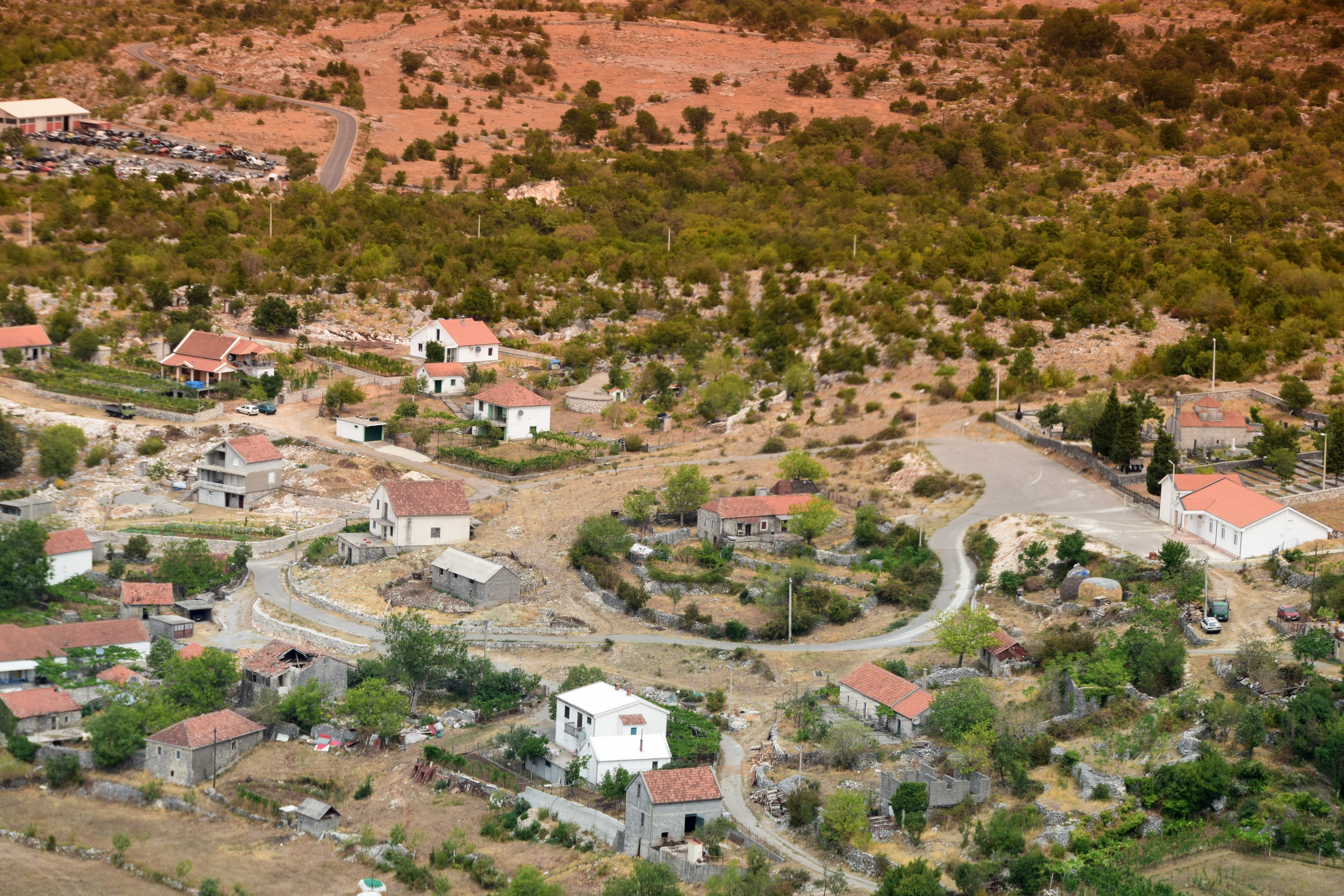
- View of town of Medun from the lookout point on the old fortress of Meteon (Medun).

- Location within Montenegro
- Coordinates: 42°28′21″N 19°21′42″E
- Country: Montenegro
- Municipality: Podgorica

Population (2011)
  - Total: 100
- Time zone: UTC+1 (CET)
  - Summer (DST): UTC+2 (CEST)

Meteon (Labeatidis terrae), Roman times

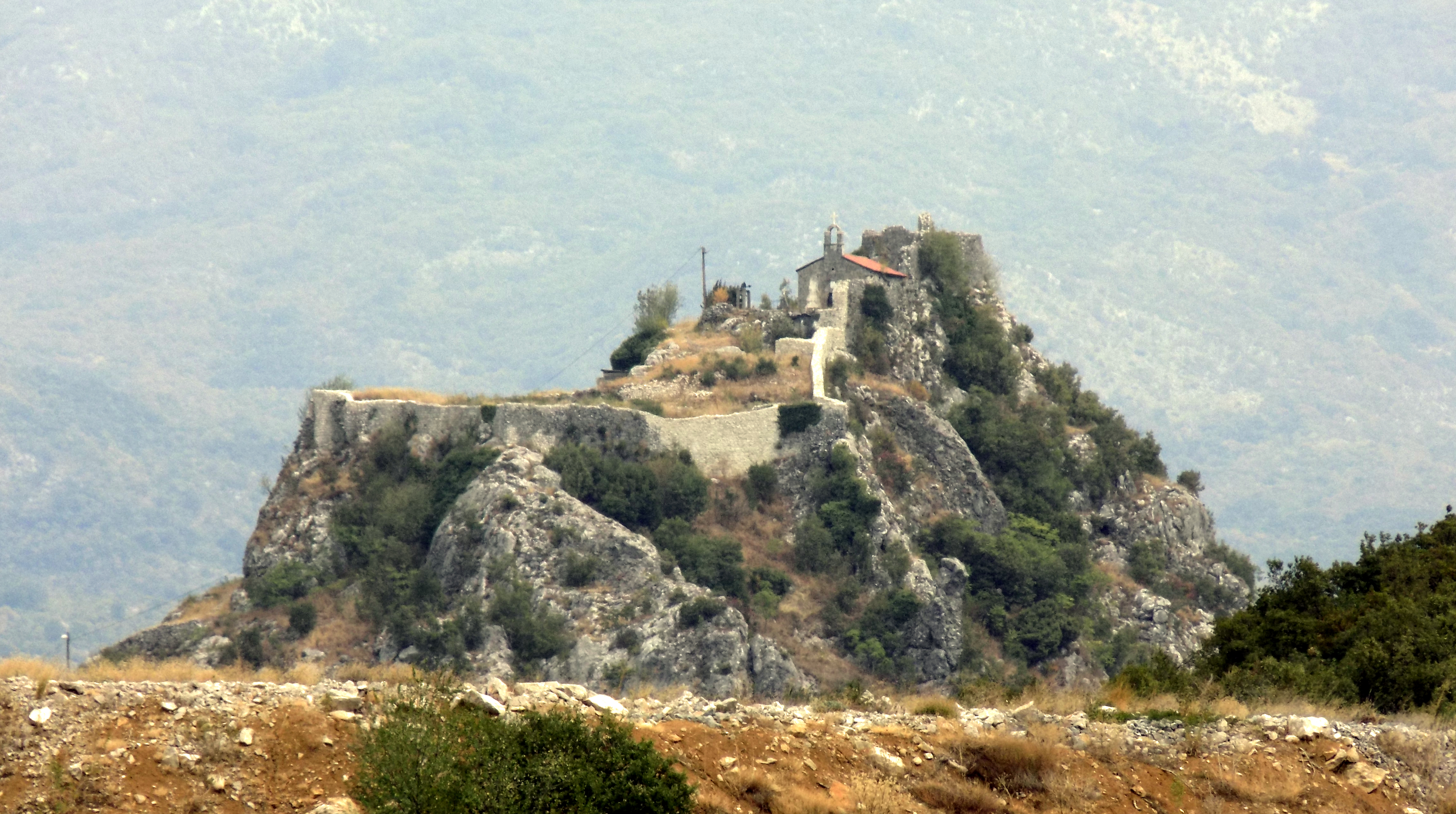
Remains of the old town of Meteon.

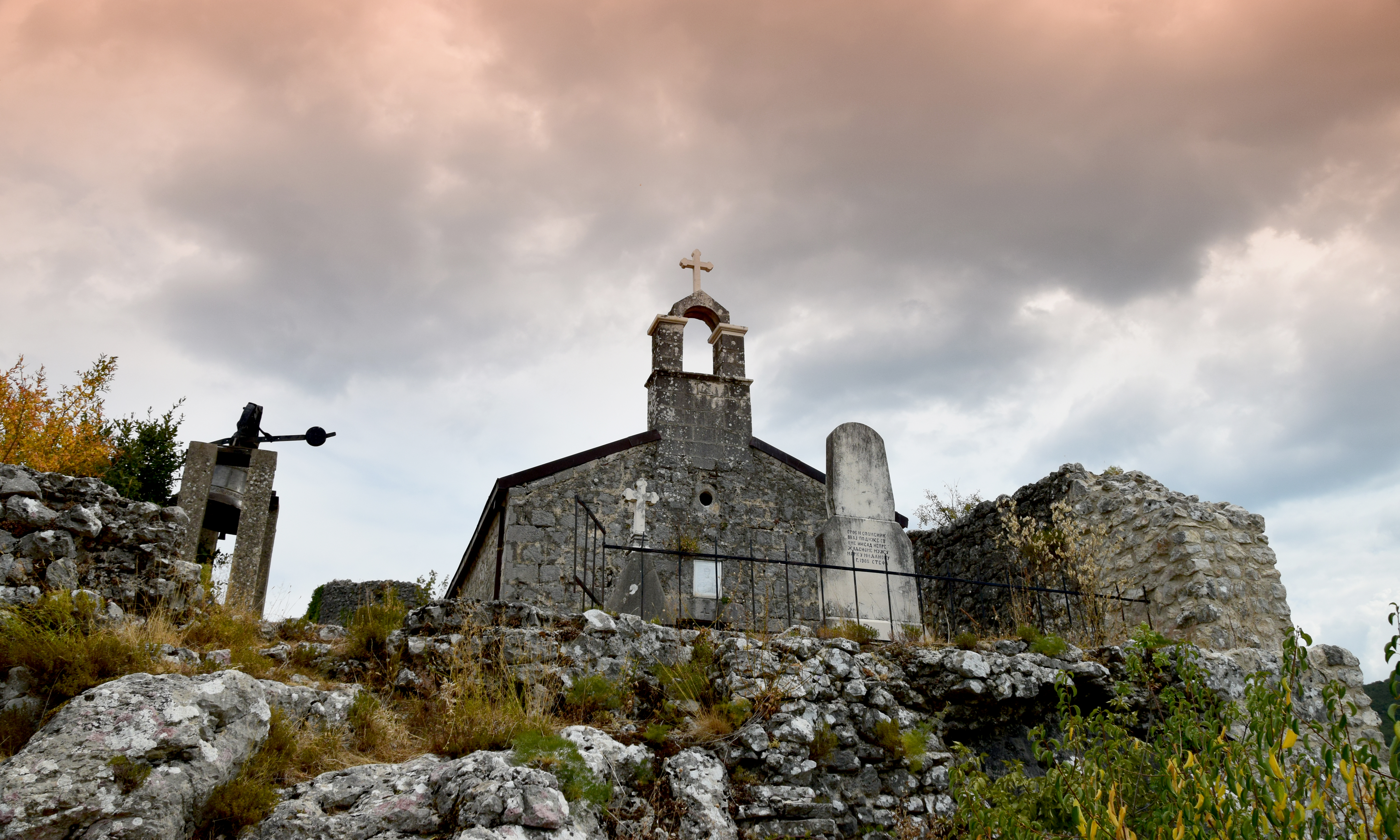
Church on the fortress.

Medieval Medun in the Upper Zeta, Middle Ages

Medun (Montenegrin Cyrillic: Медун) is a settlement located 13 km northeast of the capital Podgorica, Montenegro. The village houses the archaeological site of the ancient fortified city of Medeon. It is situated in the tribal area of Upper Kuči, one of the highland tribes. In the 2003 census, it had 108 inhabitants. In ancient times, Medun was inhabited by the Illyrians between the 4th and 3rd centuries BC.

== Geography ==
As Mariano Bolizza described in 1614, it is situated on a beautiful hill on a cleft in the mountainside, between two other mountains, overlooking a very spacious valley.

== History ==
=== Ancient and Roman times ===
Medun is an old town and fortress, situated 13 kilometers northeast from Podgorica, Montenegro. It was erected originally as a fortress, later on as a town, between 4th and 3rd centuries BC, by Illyrians living in the area. It was known as Medeon (Ancient Greek: Μεδεών), Meteon, or Modunense.

Well preserved walls of the fortress were built of big blocks of trimmed stone, placed in a number of rows. With respect to solidity and size of the construction it substantially differs from the construction of other, less significant Illyrian towns. From the cultural-artistic point of view, two lower dig ups in the rock on the road from the lower to the upper town are very interesting. Studies refer to the conclusion that it was the place of performance of rituals related to the cult of snake that represented myth ancestor to the Illyrians. Necropolis is sited north from the upper town. It originates from the Iron Age, but has not been studied. Medeon hosted the Ardiaei king Gentius, his wife Teuta and the rest of his family until they were taken captives by the Roman legions, who effectively ended the independence of Illyria and created the Roman province of Illyricum.

Medun was mentioned by Livy (59BC-17AD) as a civitas of the Labeates, an Illyrian tribe which lived around the Lake Skadar, then known as Lacus Labeatis. Roman legions conquered Medun around 167 BC, during the Third Illyrian War. On that occasion the Ardiaei king Gentius and his family were captivated, marking the establishment of Illyricum.

Besides the stairways cut into the cliffs on all sides, dating from the Iron Age, from this earlier period is also a portion of the west wall, subsequently built over by a medieval wall. Different parts of the medieval fortification date from different periods.

=== Middle Ages ===
It was referred to later, in the 7th century, by the Ravenna Geographer, under the name Medion. The medieval fortification had been built on the ruins of the Roman city. Slavs migrated to the area during the Slavic migrations into Europe and the Balkans.

čelnik Đuraš Ilijić (1326–1362) held Upper Zeta, including the city, subordinate to King Stefan Dečanski (r. 1321–1331), and Emperors Dušan the Mighty (r. 1331–1355) and Uroš the Weak (r. 1355–1371). The Balšić noble family which had taken control of Lower Zeta (lands previously held by Lord Žarko), went after Head of Upper Zeta Đuraš Ilijić in 1362, and killed him, expanding further the Zeta župa. The family is recognized as Oblastni gospodari (Lords) in charters of Emperor Uroš the Weak (r. 1355–1371).

The 1444 charter of King Alfonse V documents Medun as the property of Stephen Vukčić Kosača. In 1445, Herceg Stjepan ceded the Upper Zeta and the Medun fortress to despot Đurađ. A duke of despot Đurađ defended Medun in 1452 from Stefan I Crnojević who was a duke in the Venetian service. In 1455, despot Đurađ had to give the fortress to the Turks in their victorious drive through Southeastern Europe.

The Ottomans captured Medun in 1456.

During the rule of Ivan I Crnojević (r. 1465–1490), a certain Imrahor Aga took refuge in the region, constantly fighting the Crnojevići and attempted to expel their people from Medun. A bloody battle was fought between the two, in which Imrahor and many other leaders were slain, however, the town is taken by the Ottomans. The battle marked the downfall of the Crnojevići and the loss of a state.

The region was organized into the Sanjak of Shkodra, and in 1514, the Zeta region was established into the Sanjak of Montenegro, which would be headed by Stanko Crnojević, the son of Ivan I. Stanko was sent in 1485 to Constantinople as a guarantor of loyalty at the Ottoman court, and he converted to Islam and took the name Skanderbeg, subsequently being put for Sanjak-bey of Montenegro.

=== Early modern ===
Mariano Bolizza of Kotor, a servant of the Republic of Venice, wrote a report in 1614, initially for describing Sanjak of Shkodra's land routes which could best be utilized by local couriers conveying official correspondence from Venice to Constantinople and back, and to survey the military potential of the territory. He also provided a very detailed overview of towns and villages in Montenegro and northern Albania; their respective chiefs and men in arms, as well as demographics. Kuči, Bratonožići and part of Plava were under the soldiers of Medun, the spahee, but the commander was not named; and the highlanders would pay the Ottoman officials a portion of their income. Medun was described as a little town on a hill, strategically situated, but badly guarded and in ruins, of which fortification was held by the Dizdar Aga and 200 "very war-like people". It was one of 8 cities of the Sanjak of Shkodra. In 1688 the tribes of Kuçi, Kelmendi and Pipri captured the town defeating 2 Ottoman counter-assaults capturing many supplies on the process before retreating.

=== Modern ===
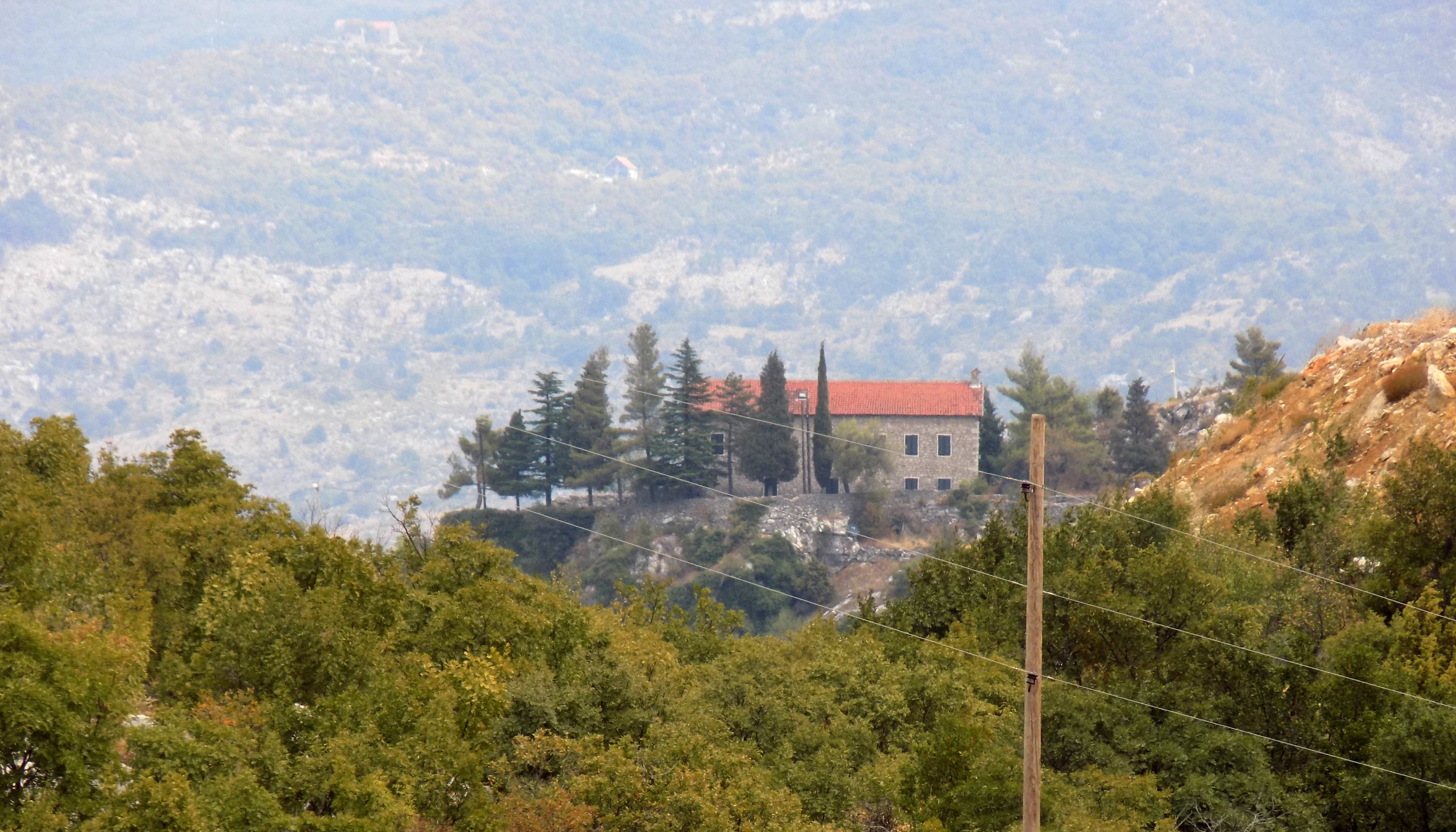
Museum of Marko Miljanov.

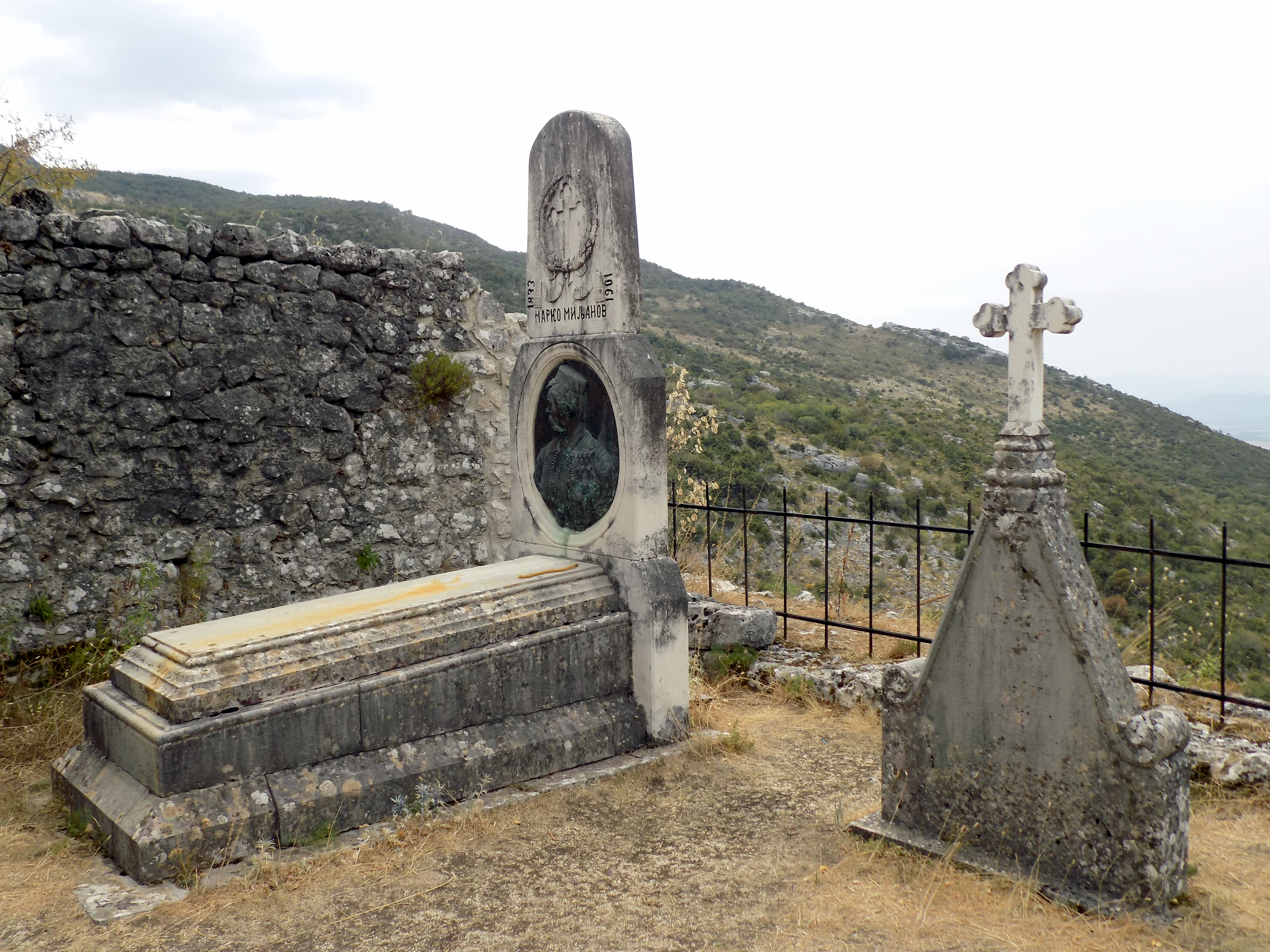
Tomb of Marko Miljanov on the fortress Meteon.

The famous writer, and Kuči tribe leader, Montenegrin duke and hero Marko Miljanov (1833–1901) lived at the foot of walls of the town and the fortress. He was buried in the acropolis in front of the small church dedicated to Archdeacon Stephen, built in Miljanov's honour the same year of his death.

A rebellion in nearby Herzegovina (1875–1878) sparked a series of rebellions and uprisings against the Ottoman forces in Europe. Montenegro and Serbia agreed to declare a war on Turkey on 18 June 1876. Nichola I's cousin had twice routed the Ottomans at Medun. A Montenegrin victory in Danilograd in Zeta, and the capitulation of Medun, concluded the first year of the Montenegrin–Ottoman War (1876–1878). In 1877/1878, Nicholas I of Montenegro acquired a seaboard on the Adriatic, and on 13 January 1878 Nicholas I and Ahmed Muhtar Pasha signed a truce, ending the war.

Medun has not yet been studied sufficiently. Not only that it is interesting for its distant and rich past, it also represents an object significant for studying of all cultural epochs, from prehistory to the Middle Ages.

== Demographics ==
In the Ottoman Defter of 1485, Medun had 15 homes.

In the Ottoman defter of 1582, the settlement was majority Muslim with only 2 Christian households.

Medun had at least 200 inhabitants in 1614.

Total: 108 inhabitants (2003 census)

- Serbs: 74 (68,51%)
- Montenegrins: 32 (29,62%)
- Yugoslavs: 1 (0,92%)
- Unknown: 1 (0,92%)

According to the 2011 census, its population was 100.

Ethnicity in 2011
Ethnicity	Number	Percentage
Serbs	64	64.0%
Montenegrins	32	32.0%
other/undeclared	4	4.0%
Total	100	100%

== Marko Miljanov Museum ==
The museum dedicated to Marko Miljanov is located in the building in Medun, where he lived from 1878 to 1901 and wrote most of his works. After his death, the house was used as a primary school until 1971, when it became a memorial museum. The permanent exhibit presents details from his life: personal items – clothing, weapons, jewelry; a collection of manuscripts, editions of his works, and a library. There are also ethnographic items from his time, used in Kuče and neighboring tribes, including folk costumes and everyday items, such as furniture, cutlery, wooden dishes, etc.

== Notable people ==
- Marko Miljanov (1833–1901), writer, born in the village
- Milica Miljanov (ca. 1860-1950), soldier and WWI heroine
