= Battle of Vučji Do =

1876 battle during the Montenegrin-Ottoman War of 1876-78

Coordinates: 42°56′38″N 18°24′28″E

- Part of: Montenegrin–Ottoman War (1876–78); Herzegovina Uprising (1875–78)
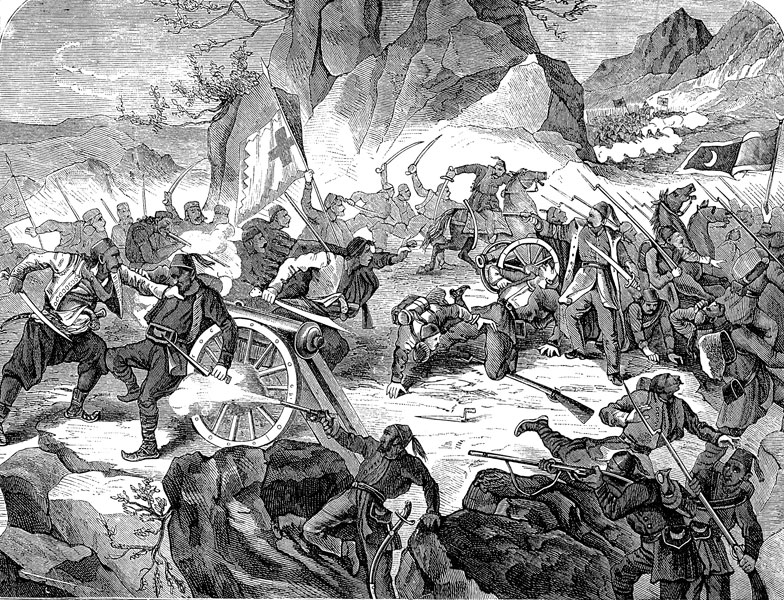
- From the illustrative magazine Orao (1877)
Date	18 July 1876
Location	Vučji Do, Montenegro
Result	Montenegrin-Herzegovinian victory

Belligerents
Montenegro; Herzegovinian rebels	Ottoman Empire

Commanders and leaders
Prince Nikola I Petar Vukotić; Simo Baćović; Anto Daković	Ahmed Muhtar Pasha; Osman Nuri Pasha (POW)

Strength
14,000: 17 Montenegrin battalions 11 Herzegovinian battalions 4 cannons	45,000: 24 battalions 12 cannons

The Battle of Vučji Do was a major battle of the Montenegrin-Ottoman War of 1876-78 that took place on 18 July 1876 in Vučji Do, Montenegro, fought between the combined forces of Montenegrin and Eastern Herzegovinian tribes (battalions) against the Ottoman Army under Grand Vizier Ahmed Muhtar Pasha. The Montenegrin-Herzegovinian forces heavily defeated the Ottomans, and managed to capture two of their commanders. In addition, they captured a large consignment of armaments.

== Background ==
As the Uprising in Herzegovina continued, Germany, Russia and Austria-Hungary proposed a two-month truce at the meeting held in mid-May. At the same time negotiations between the Serbian and Montenegrin governments result to the two declaring war on the Ottoman Empire on 30 June 1876.

== Battle ==
The battle took place in Vučji Do, near Nikšić.

Selim Pasha was killed by Đoko Popović, from the Cuce tribe, while Osman Pasha was captured by Luka Dragišić, from the Piperi tribe.

== Gallery ==
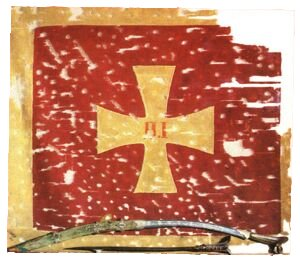
Montenegrin flag used in the battle, damaged by Ottoman bullets.

== Sources ==
- Gavro Vukotić, Rat 1876 Crne Gore sa Turskom, Cetinje 1929. (COBISS.SR-ID:30379271)
- Lj. Poleksić, Boj na Vučjem Dolu 28. jula 1876, Ratnik, X/1940
- Dimitrije Trifunović, Vučji Do, Military encyclopaedia (second edition), том X, p. 626, Vojnoizdavački zavod Belgrade, Belgrade 1975
- Milutin Miljušković Velike crnogorske bitke: Vučji do i Fundina, Podgorica 1997. (COBISS.SR-ID:121793031)
