= Marko Miljanov =

19th century Montenegrin chieftain, general and writer

- Марко Миљанов
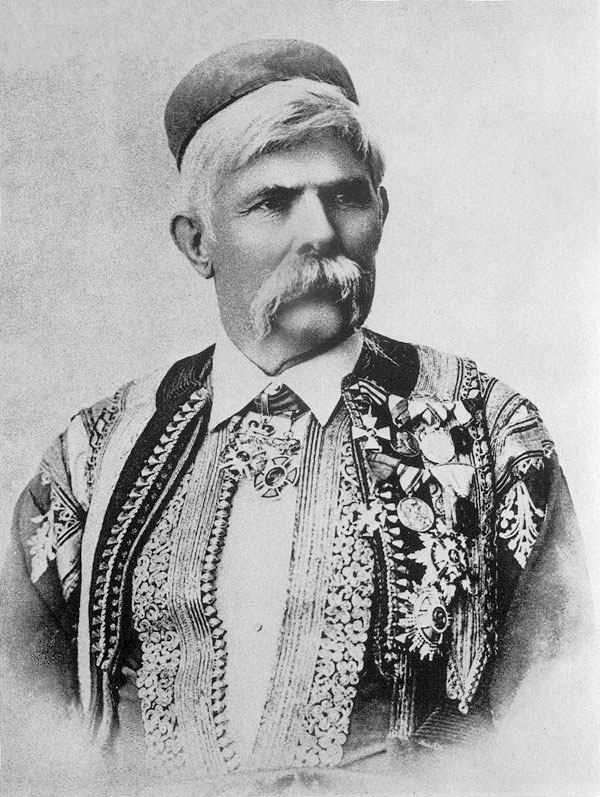
- Miljanov at old age, seen in folk costume, with numerous medals
- Born: 25 April 1833; Medun, Sanjak of Scutari, Ottoman Empire
- Died: 2 February 1901 (aged 67); Herceg Novi, Kingdom of Dalmatia, Austria-Hungary
- Occupations: Clan chief, statesman, writer
- Known for: Literary works on Montenegrin society.
- Title: Chief of the Kuči clan Chief of the Bratonožići clan
- Children: Milica Miljanov
- Relatives: Olgivanna Lloyd Wright (grand-daughter)

Marko Miljanov Popović (Serbian Cyrillic: Марко Миљанов Поповић, pronounced [mâːrkɔ mǐʎanɔʋ pɔ̌pɔʋit͡ɕ]; Albanian: Mark Milani Popoviq; 25 April 1833 – 2 February 1901) was a Brda chieftain and Montenegrin general and writer.

He entered the service of Danilo I, the first secular Prince of Montenegro in the modern era, and led his armed Kuči tribe against the Ottoman Empire in the wars of 1861–62 and 1876–78, distinguishing himself as an able military leader. He managed to unite his tribe with Montenegro in 1874. There was later a rift between Miljanov and Prince Nikola I. He was also an accomplished writer who gained repute for his descriptions of Montenegrin society.

His grand-daughter Olgivanna Lloyd Wright headed Frank Lloyd Wright's fellowship and foundation in the United States.

== Biography ==
Marko was born in the village of Medun on 25 April (St. Mark's Day) 1833, and was given the name "Marko" accordingly. His father was Miljan Jankov Popović, while his mother Borika was an Albanian Catholic born in Orahovo. He was baptized by Orthodox priest Spasoje Jokov Popović. He was fluent in Albanian, using it in cases when meeting with Albanian speakers. When visiting the people of Ulcinj, Miljanov explained that Albanian was the language spoken by his family at home. Miljanov considered himself a Serb. Near the end of his life, Miljanov wrote a letter to one of the Kuči clan leaders. In the letter he writes: I am dying happy, and although I didn't live long enough to read my books, I'll be listening from the grave as grandsons of my friends read them. As a Kuč, I am dying mostly happy, but as a Serb, I'm dying unhappy and dissatisfied.

The village of Medun was located in the Kuči tribe (in present-day Podgorica Municipality, Montenegro) of the Brda (Highland) region. The tribe at the time was de facto independent from the Ottoman Empire as well as the direct rule of Petar II Petrović-Njegoš. Like his fellow highlanders, Miljanov took part in hajdučija (guerilla fighting) against the Ottomans in the region.

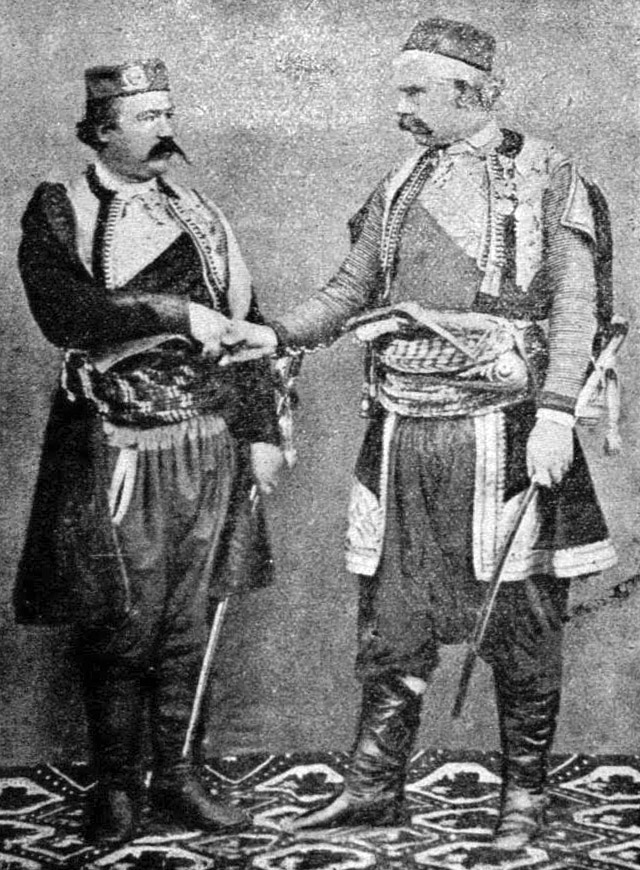
Herzegovinian chieftain Lazar Sočica and Marko Miljanov shaking hands.

In 1856, he came to the Montenegrin capital Cetinje and entered the service of Prince Danilo in his guards unit called perjanici. For his bravery and successes in raids on Ottoman territory and as a man of confidence, he was awarded in 1862 the position of judge and head of Bratonožići tribe (that neighboured Kuči). For his work on the unification of Kuči with Montenegro in 1874, he had a price set on his head by the Ottomans. The same year saw his appointment to the Montenegrin Senate (from 1879 transformed into a State Council).

In the 1876–78 war against the Ottomans, he was one of three commanders that victoriously led Montenegrin forces in the Battle of Fundina. In 1879 the Brda forces under his supreme command were defeated by the Albanian irregulars in the Battle of Novšiće, fought for the territory of Plav and Gusinje. After a fierce disagreement with Prince Nikola in 1882, he had to leave the State Council and decided to retire from public life to his native Medun. Although he was 50 years old, Marko Miljanov, who was illiterate like most of his countrymen, decided to learn to write. He explained his urge in a foreword to the lost manuscript of his epic songs with the words: "Dear Serb brother, if you had the chance to see the heroes that I have seen, your heart would give you no peace until you have responded to the heroes who die merrily for their own and rights of all of us."

He died at Herceg Novi in 1901.

== Works ==
Marko Miljanov died before any of his works were published. All works were originally published in Serbia, as Marko was a well-known dissident to King Nicholas.

- Examples of Humanity and Bravery (Serbian: Примјери чојства и јунаштва, Belgrade 1901), his most important work, is a collection of true anecdotes depicting practical examples of achieved ethical ideal Montenegrins of his time strived for. It is a lasting monument to the otherwise unsung heroes of the Montenegrin struggle for independence in the 19th century. The anecdotes describe common and humble people, their language and customs and their deeds that made other Montenegrins and Albanians admire them. Marko's language and phrase is plain and coarse, however, his message is resounding.
- The Kuči Tribe in Folk Stories and Poems (Serbian: Племе Кучи у народној причи и пјесми, Belgrade 1904), his second published book, is a collection of historical, folkloric and ethnographical (anthropological) data on the Kuči tribe.
- Life and the Customs of Albanians (Serbian: Живот и обичаји Арбанаса), is a work on the immediate neighboring Albanian Catholic tribes which describes their culture and daily life. Written in 1907 describing the customs of the Albanian Malesors (Highlanders). Although he spent a lifetime fighting the Albanians, he was also much fascinated and an admirer. The book was published posthumously. The book describes the culture of Northern Albanian Highlanders (the "Malesors"), their customs (including besa, "oath", and vendetta), kinship and hospitality.
- Serbian Hajduks (Serbian: Српски хајдуци), epic
- Something about the Bratonožići (Serbian: Нешто о Братоножићима), epic

== Gallery ==
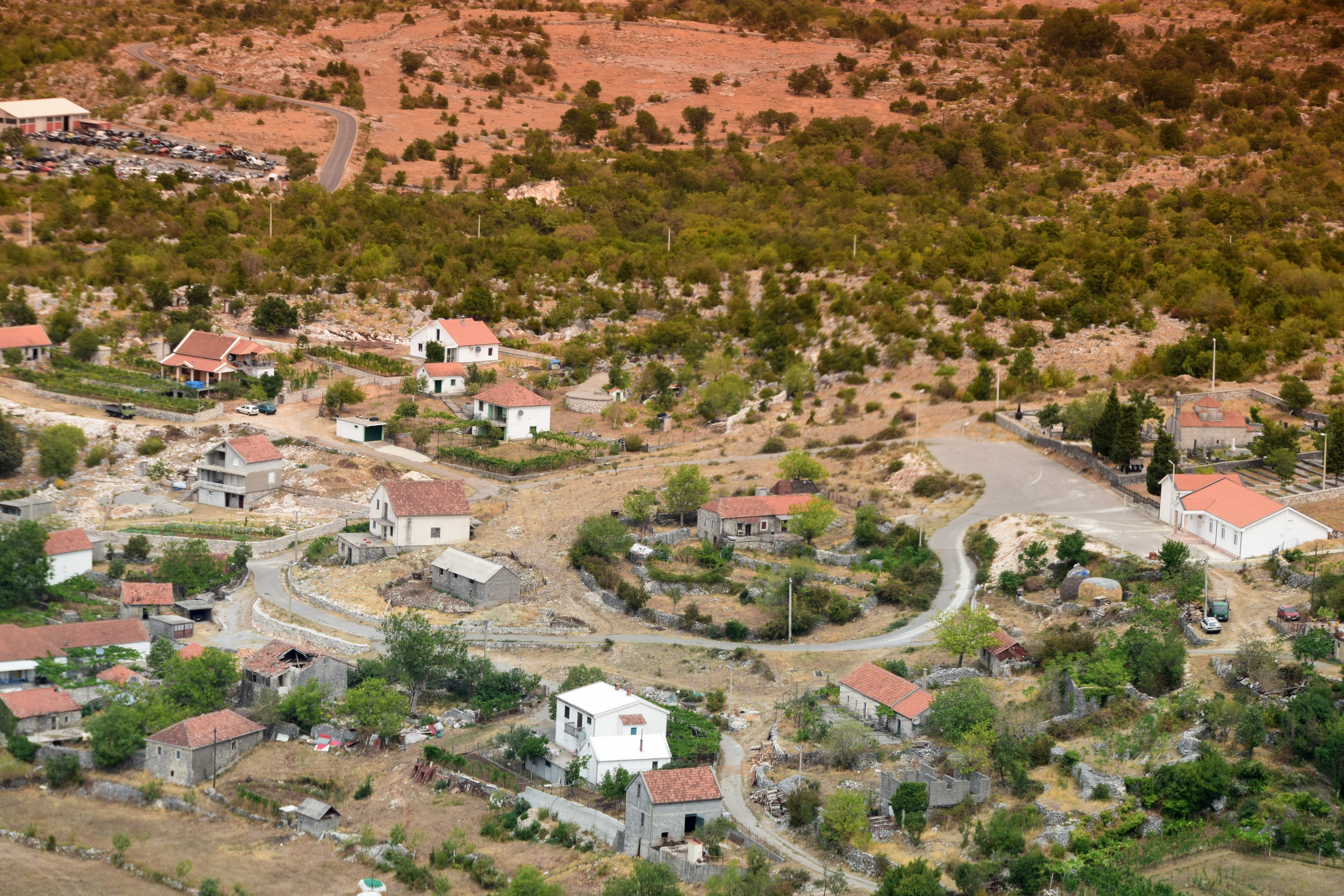
Medun, Kuči, the birthplace of Marko Miljanov Popović

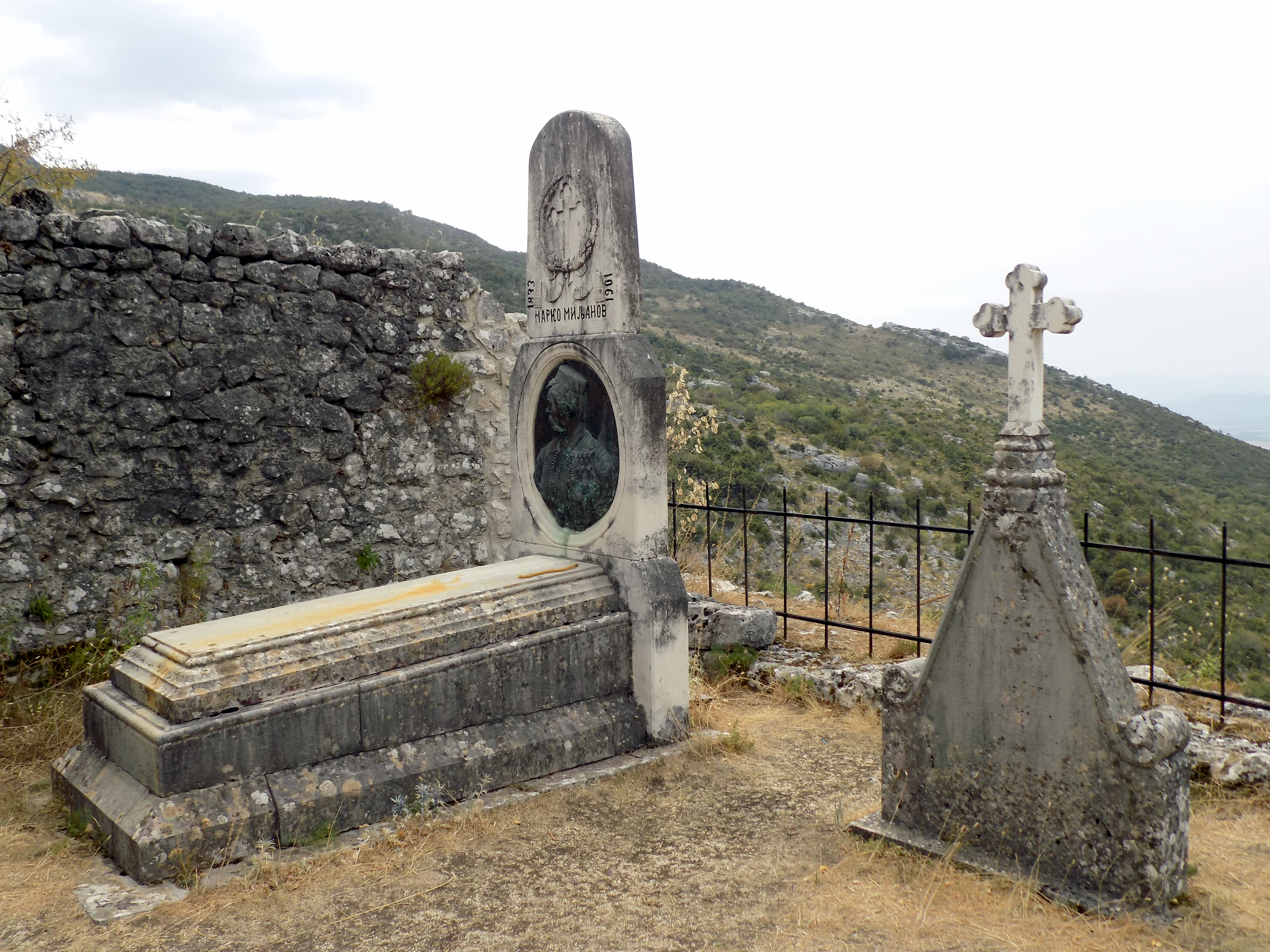
Tomb of Marko Miljanov on the fortress Meteon (Medun)

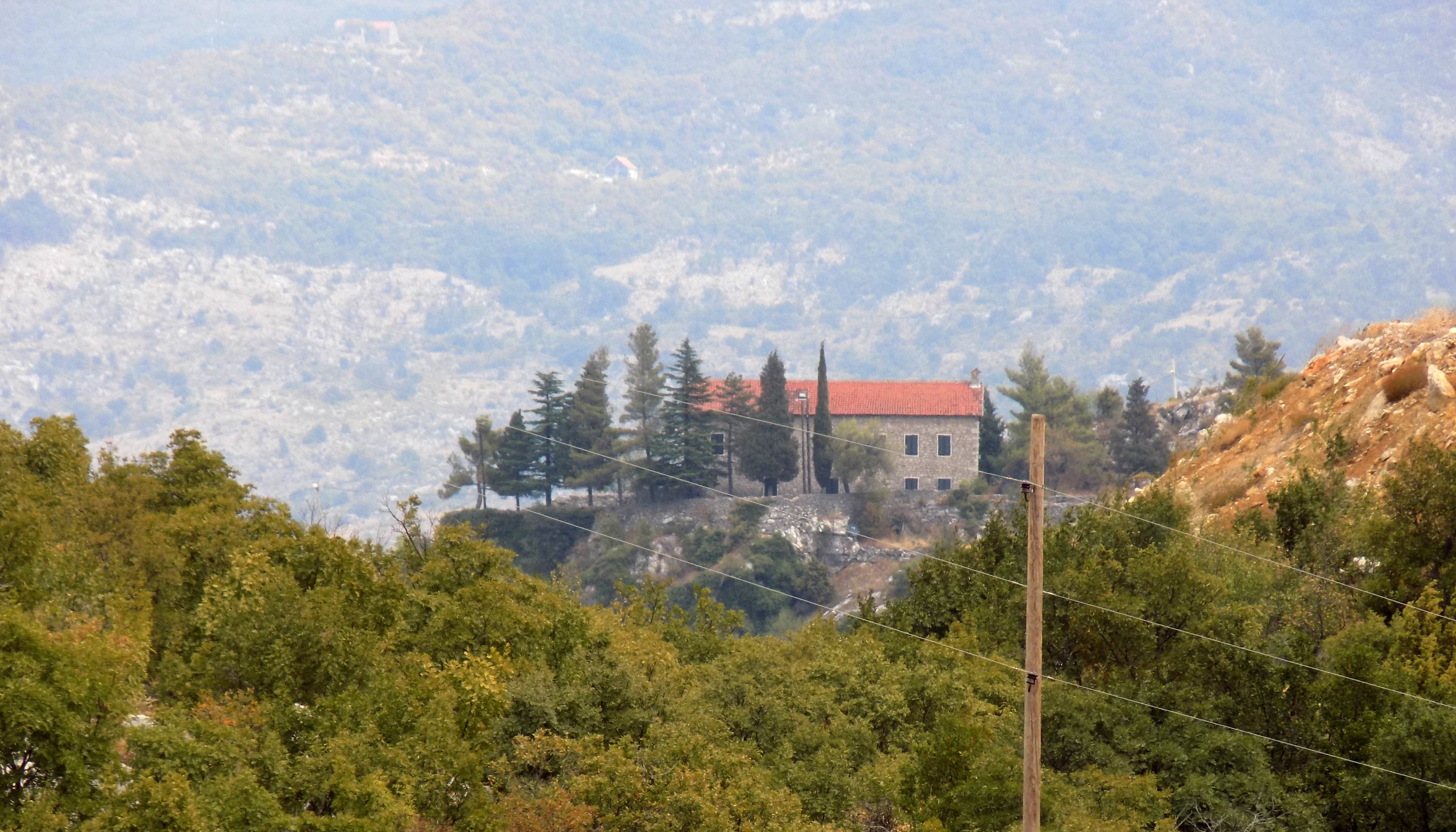
Museum of Marko Miljanov

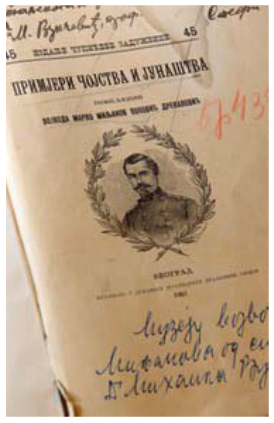
1901 edition of Miljanov's "Examples of Humanity and Bravery"

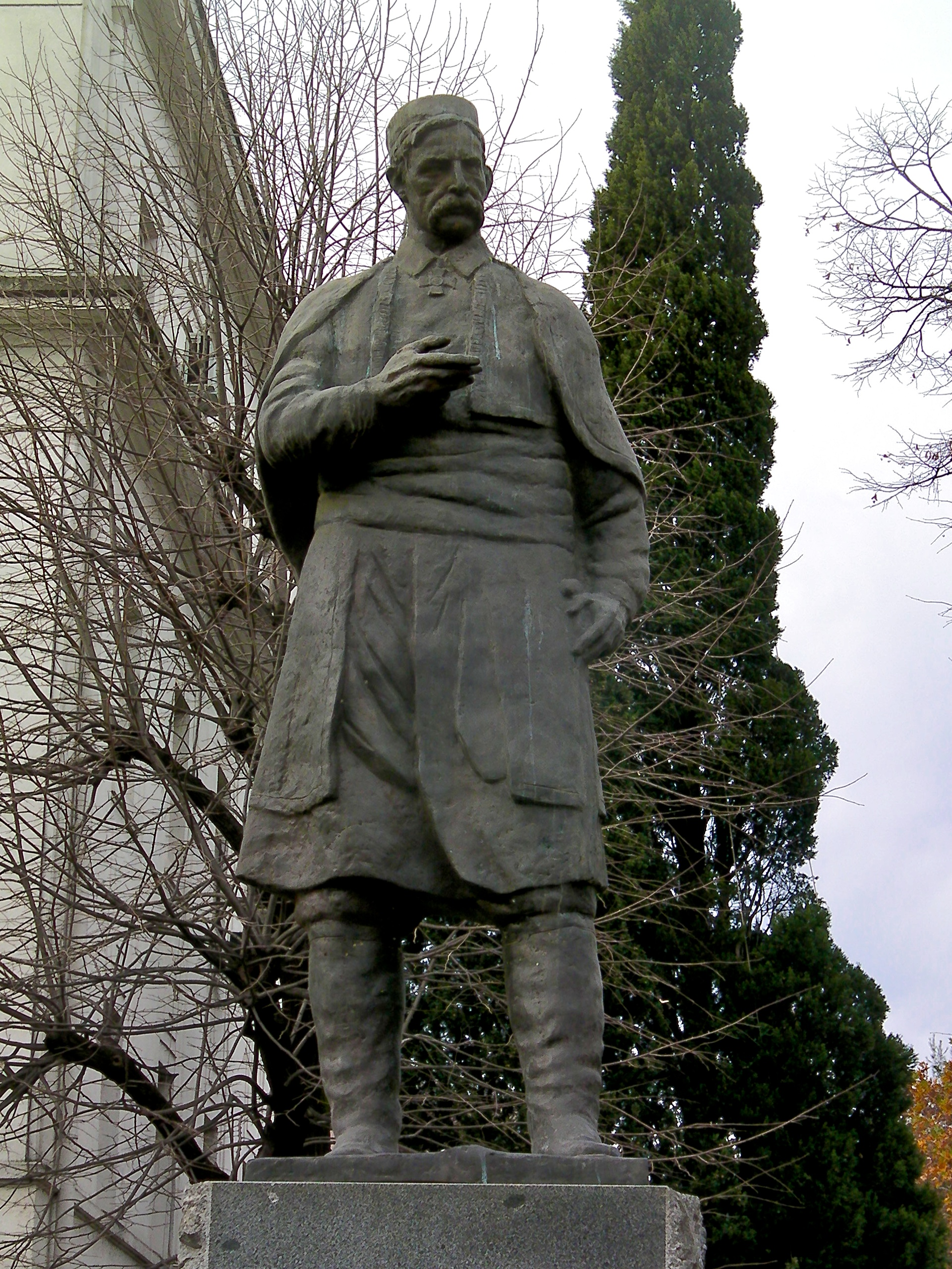
Monument to Marko Miljanov in Podgorica

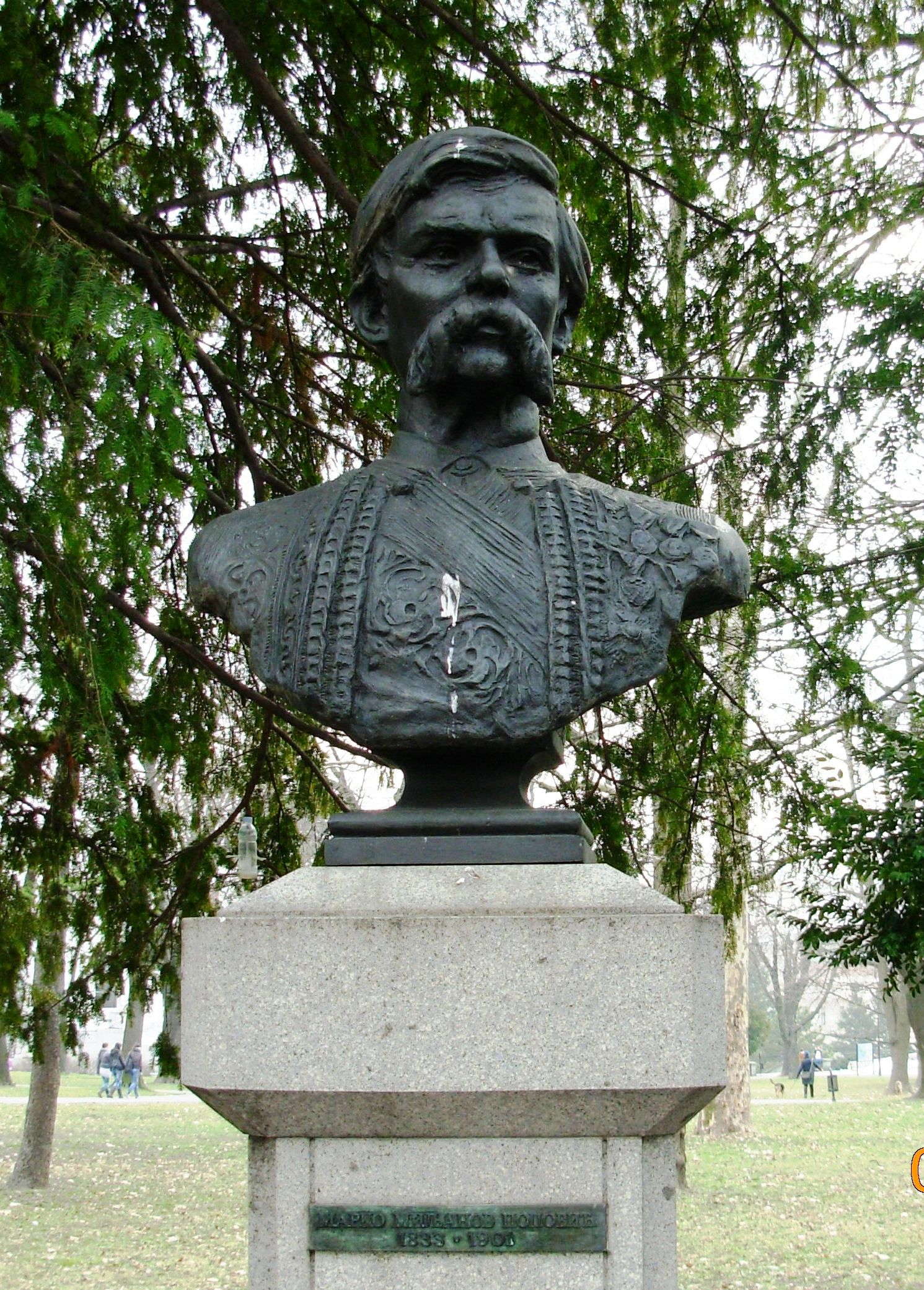
Memorial bust of Marko Miljanov in Belgrade, Kalemegdan

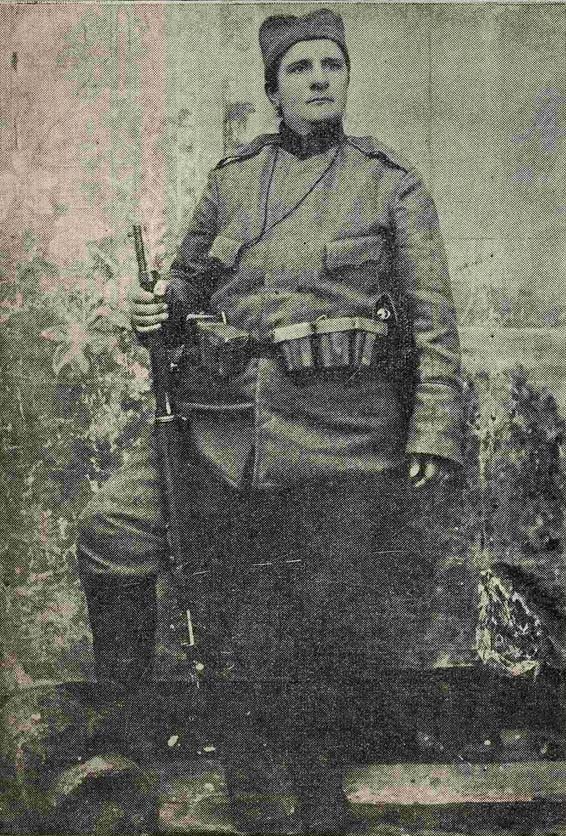
Miljanov's daughter Milica, soldier and war heroine in World War I

== See also ==
- Tomo P. Oraovac

== Bibliography ==
- Đukić, Trifun (1957). Marko Miljanov. Nolit.
- Jovanović, J. (1952). Marko Miljanov.
- Miljanov, Marko (1904). Племе Кучи у народној причи и пјесми.
- O., C. (29 January 1944). "Марко Миљанов". Српски народ: 7.
- Mirović, Dejan (15 May 2013). "Marko Miljanov – srpski heroj i pisac". Nova srpska politička misao.
