= Banjani (Sokolac) =

Banjani Бањани
- Village
- Location within Bosnia and Herzegovina
- Coordinates: 43°54′34″N 18°50′07″E
- Country: Bosnia and Herzegovina
- Entity: Republika Srpska
- Municipality: Sokolac
- Time zone: UTC+1 (CET)
  - Summer (DST): UTC+2 (CEST)

Banjani (Serbian Cyrillic: Бањани; earlier: Bandin Odžak, Бандин Оџак) is a village in the municipality of Sokolac, Bosnia and Herzegovina.
