= Cem (river) =

River in Montenegro and Albania

Cem Cijevna, Цијевна
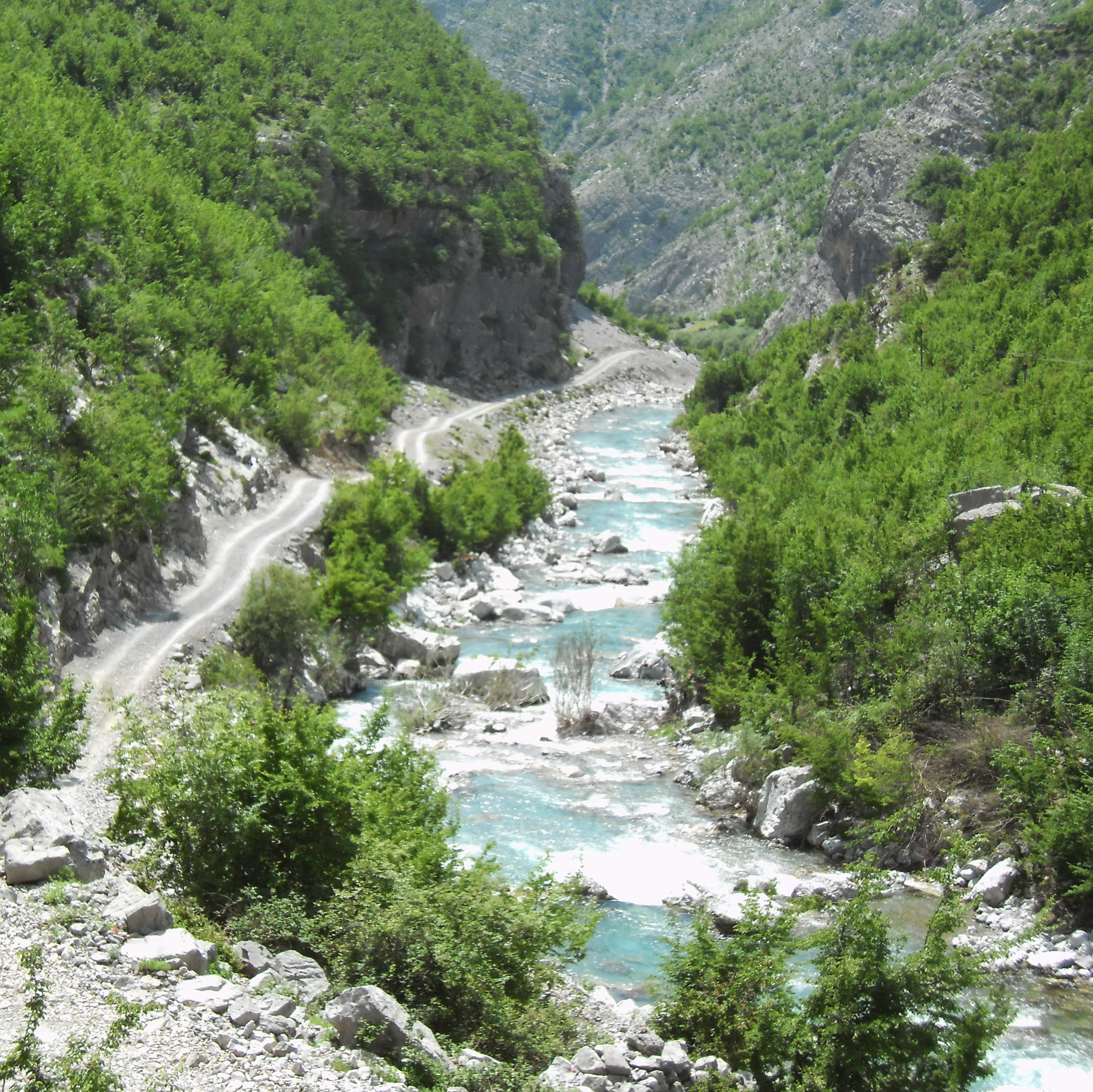
- Cem river flowing through Kelmend

Location
- Countries: Albania and Montenegro

Physical characteristics
- Source
  - location: Accursed Mountains
- Mouth
  - location: Morača
  - coordinates: 42°21′04″N 19°12′20″E
- Length: 58.8 km (36.5 mi)
- Basin size: 368 square kilometres (142 sq mi)
- Discharge
  - average: 24.86 m^{3}/s (878 cu ft/s)

Basin features
- Progression: Morača→ Lake Skadar→ Bojana→ Adriatic Sea

The Cem (Albanian: Cem, or in its definite form Cemi), also known as the Cijevna (Cyrillic: Цијевна), is a river that rises in Kelmend, Albania and after nearly half of its length crosses into Montenegro, where it flows into the River Morača near the capital Podgorica.

The Cem is fully formed at the confluence of its two tributaries the Vukël Cem and the Selcë Cem. It passes mostly through limestone terrain with many karstic formations. These features of the Cem's basin have their origin in the tectonic activity of the Alpine orogeny, which formed the Dinaric Alps. The terrain through which it flows in its 58.8-kilometre (36.5 mi) course, is at an elevation of more than 1,200 m (3,900 ft) and can reach as low as 50 m (160 ft). It passes through narrow valleys and steep canyons, where waterfalls are formed before it reaches the Zeta plain. As it approaches the Morača, the Cem area shifts from a continental climate to a Mediterranean one. The drainage basin of the Cem encompasses 368 square kilometres (142 sq mi) and is part of the Adriatic river basin.

The first cultural indicators of human settlement in the Cem river basin are from the late Copper Age and early Bronze Age (3500-2300 BC). Illyrian tribes such as the Labeatae lived in the area in classical antiquity. In the following millennia, the area passed under the control of the Roman Empire and its eastern counterpart, Slavic principalities, the Republic of Venice and the Ottoman Empire. The Cem basin was the home of Albanian tribes (fise) such as Kelmendi, Hoti, Gruda and Triepshi until the 20th century. Today, the river is divided between Albania and Montenegro.

The Cem is one of the last free-flowing rivers in Europe. The river's basin is a source of very high biodiversity, and hundreds of plant and animal species live along its banks. Mammals include wild boars, brown bears and red foxes. The river's canyon is an Important Bird Area for species like the short-toed snake eagle and the Levant sparrowhawk. The marble trout is one of the 22 fish species in the river, which consistently ranks as one of the least polluted rivers in Albania and Montenegro. In the 21st century, it is threatened by industrialization, the installation of small hydropower stations and the effects of climate change in Europe.

== Etymology ==
The Greek geographer Ptolemy was the first to mention the Cem as Kinna in ancient Greek. In Tabula Peutingeriana a location named Cinna in Latin is connected to the river. These two forms are considered to be written forms of a local, Illyrian name Cinua. Albanian Cem and medieval Slavic Cenva and Cemva ultimately stem from this original name of the river. The phonological evolution of Cinua to the Albanian Cem presupposes the Slavic second palatalization. Montenegrin– and also Bosniak and Serbian – Cijevna is derived from Serbo-Croatian cijev (pipe), but other toponyms preserve the older name Ćemovsko polje (field of Cem).

== Course ==
The Cem originates in Kelmend, Malësi e Madhe, Albania and flows through the region of Malësia. The river has two tributaries: the Vukël Cem (Cemi i Vuklit) and the Selcë Cem (Cemi i Selcës), which join at the confluence of Tamarë. The Vukël Cem – the more important of the two in terms of water volume – rises at 900 m (3,000 ft) above sea level and flows for 17.9 km (11.1 mi). It passes through a narrow canyon, a terrain which widens only near Kozhnja, where deposition has formed a small limestone valley. A creek called the Nikç Cem (Cem i Nikçit) contributes to its volume in the rainy period. A small hydropower project has been built where the Cem i Nikçit passes through Kozhnja.

The Selcë Cem rises at 1,250 m (4,100 ft) on Mount Bordolec near Lëpushë and flows for 22.5 km (14.0 mi) mostly through narrow limestone terrain until it reaches the valley of Tamarë. In its course it passes through the Gropat e Selcës karstic caves, the canyon of Gerrlla, 900 m (3,000 ft) long and 25 m (82 ft) deep, and the 30-metre-high (98 ft) waterfall of Sllapi before reaching Dobrinjë.

The Cem then flows to the southwest for 26.5 kilometres (16.5 mi) before crossing into Montenegro, near the village of Grabom. The Albania-Montenegro border crossing is located ca. 5 km (3.1 mi) west of Grabom. In Montenegro, the river flows through the villages of Tuzi for 32.3 kilometres (20.1 mi) before it flows into the Morača, just south of Podgorica. The terrain through which the river flows in Montenegro is divided into two parts. Firstly, it forms a steep canyon and then slowly crosses into the Zeta plain, of which a part is called Ćemovsko polje after the river. On the plain, Špiro Mugoša Airport has been built between the Cem and the Ribnica to the east of Podgorica Airport. The land here has become more urbanized and industrialized.

The Cem canyon (Kanjon Cijevne/Kanioni i Cemit) is 12 km (7.5 mi) long and has a depth of 903 m (2,963 ft). It is the natural habitat of many animal, insect and plant species. The canyon starts at the Albania-Montenegro border and forms a distinct geomorphological formation that crosses into Ćemovsko polje just before the village of Dinosha.

== Geology ==
Geomorphology of the Dinaric Alps. Cem is found in the Accursed Mountains/Albanian Alps subdivision in B31

The geomorphological features of the Cem basin have their origin in the tectonic activity of the Alpine orogeny, which has been forming the Dinaric Alps and its southern range, the Accursed Mountains since the Late Mesozoic and Cenozoic era. The Cem basin is in the High Karst Unit. In this sub-unit, tectonic activity lifts the landmasses vertically and carbonate rocks form a large part of the landscape, which is defined by fluvial processes like the deposition of carbonate sediments by the river caused by the flow of the river. As the Accursed Mountains have had glacial features, thus a high accumulation of water, the end of the Ice Age saw a general increase of the Cem's discharge, which in turn increased fluvial processes in the basin.

An abundance of limestone has enabled the formation of uvalas, caves and other karst formations. However, water is retained in limestone, and so the denudation of geological formations is decreasing. The result of these interconnected processes is that the Cem flows mostly through elevated, vertical and steep terrain, which forms canyons and crosses into small valleys. In these places, such as in the valley of Tamara, non-carbonate rocks have caused horizontal erosion to occur. Then, the river exits high elevation areas and flows towards the Morača as the relief flattens and a polje is formed by karst processes.

== Drainage basin ==
The Cem crossing Albanian-Montenegrin border - topographical map

The drainage basin of the Cem is a 368 square kilometres (142 sq mi) part of the Adriatic river basin, along with other rivers that empty into Lake Skadar, a total area of 6,560 square kilometres (2,530 sq mi). The river and its tributaries originate within the 238 km^{2} (92 sq mi) of the basin that are within the borders of Albania; 130 km^{2} (50 sq mi) are in Montenegro. To the north, it borders the basin of the Vermosh and to the east that of the Lëpushë. To the south, the Cem's basin ends near Bogë.

The river flows from above 1,250 m (4,100 ft) to no more than 50 m (160 ft). In Montenegro, waterfalls more than 50 m (160 ft) high are formed. Annual precipitation is about 2,500 mm (98 in). The month with highest precipitation is November (361 mm (14.2 in)) and the driest month is July (69.9 mm (2.75 in)). Snowfall can be observed as late as May. There is on average a 40-day period of annual snowfall and an accumulation average of 70 cm (28 in).

The Cem has a continental climate in its upper part and a Mediterranean one as it reaches the Morača. The annual temperature averages 6.8-7 °C - January being the coldest month at -3 °C and July the hottest at 15.7-20 °C. Water temperatures range from 5 °C in the spring to 13 °C in the summer. There are three local winds that affect the Cem in Albania. The Murlani is a dry and cold northern and northeastern wind which blows towards the Adriatic, whereas the Shiroku and the Juga are humid and warm southern winds which are associated with rainy periods.

== Discharge ==
The river's streamflow increases as tributaries and springs flow into it. Elevation and other morphological features also cause variations in its discharge. In general, the upper part of the Cem in Albania has a lower velocity and thus a lower streamflow than the flow of the Cem through the canyon in Montenegro, where the Cem's streamflow increases as it descends. When it reaches the Zeta plain, it slows again as it flows into the Morača.

The Cem of Vukël contributes 10.2–10.5 m^{3}/s (360–370 cu ft/s) to the river. Measurements at Tamarë, where the confluence with Cem of Selcë is located, show an average discharge of 13.99–14.4 m^{3}/s (494–509 cu ft/s). As the river passes into Montenegro near Grabom, karstic springs in at Dverbta and Brezhda increase its streamflow. After this point the average discharge through the canyon is 24.86 m^{3}/s (878 cu ft/s), but as it crosses into the valley, it can drop below 5 m^{3}/s (180 cu ft/s) in the dry summer months. The maximal discharge rate of the river has been observed in May at 41.6 m^{3}/s (1,470 cu ft/s).

Causes of the flow decrease include its use in the water supply network and environmental factors linked to climate change, which has led to a cyclical decrease of rainfall, groundwater and karstic springs water yield to the river. This trend of flow decrease was observed in the Trgaj measurement station near Dinosha, in 2019, where the summer flow was at a very low 3 m^{3}/s (110 cu ft/s). As the Cem pours into the Morača, it can contribute up to 35 m^{3}/s (1,200 cu ft/s) to the total discharge of 210 m^{3}/s (7,400 cu ft/s) of that river into Lake Shkodra.

== Ecosystem ==
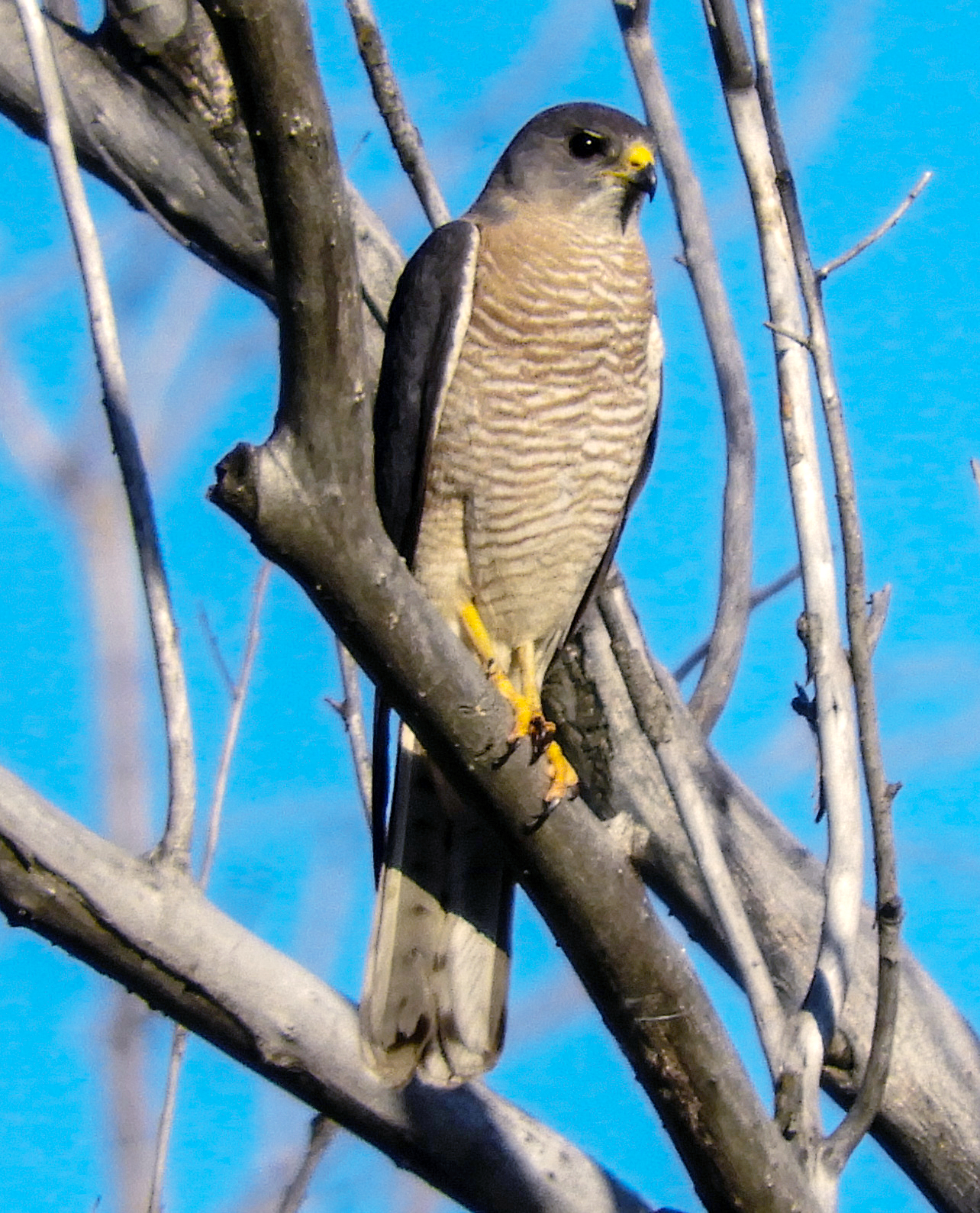
The Levant sparrowhawk (Accipiter brevipes) breeds in the river's canyon

The ecosystem of the Cem river basin is very biodiverse. The riparian zones of the Cem support hundreds of plant and animal species endemic to the region. Mammals include wild boars, brown bears, red foxes, brown hares, pine martens and the - until recently - endangered Eurasian otter. The total number of mammal species in the Cem valley has not yet been completely surveyed.

Many bird species live on the banks of the Cem and the river's canyon is an Important Bird Area. Short-toed snake eagles, Levant sparrowhawks and the rock partridge use the canyon for breeding and nesting in the summer months. The Egyptian vulture, an endangered species - once very common in the Balkans - lived in the canyon until 1997, when it became extinct there as in many other areas in the Balkans. In Albania, 130 bird species in total have been identified along the Cem and its tributaries.

There are 22 species of fish in the river including endemic marble trout and eel. The height of the Cem above sea level affects flora distribution zones. At elevations between 900–1,200 metres (3,000–3,900 ft) oak trees are common around Selcë and Vukël, but as elevation drops pomegranates become much more common. In the river basin about 40% of the total plant species found in Albania, have been identified. In the Cem canyon, 813 plant species have been identified, with a total of 959 in the wider canyon area. The canyon is host to a quarter of the total plant species of Montenegro.

A full identification of the flora of the Cem has yet to be completed. In 2018, the moss species Fissidens fontanus was identified for the first time in the part of the river in Montenegro, near Podgorica and in the nearby Sitnica river.

== Environmental issues ==
Until the 1990s, Kelmendi's geographical position as a heavily guarded border zone and lack of industrial development preserved the Cem's ecosystem. Ecological indicators and water quality assessment have consistently shown that the Cem is one of the least polluted rivers in the country. While in the post-1990 transition era there were no adequate monitoring stations, since 2008-2010 environmental monitoring has become more frequent. Within Albania, in recent years, the Cem's ecosystem and very high biodiversity have been threatened by the planned installation of 14 small hydropower plants. As of 2020, construction of two units has begun, in Muras (2 MW) and Dobrinjë (1 MW), both along the Cem of Selcë.

In Kelmend, locals have protested strongly against the projects as water used for irrigation will be significantly reduced, and the impact on the ecosystem will endanger ecologically sustainable development in the entire area. In Podgorica, after protests by environmental activists, the Montenegrin government requested full documentation of the Strategic Impact Assessment of the proposed hydropower plants on the river flow as both countries have signed the Espoo Convention, which requires transnational consultation on projects that impact natural resources across borders. The Albanian government has declared that the river's flow towards Montenegro will not be affected. The same process of hydropower expansion is also planned for many of the free-flowing rivers of the Balkans including Morača, where the Cem debouches.

In Montenegro, the river is ranked as one of the cleanest rivers in the country. As in Albania, before the 1990s, the part nearest to the border was heavily militarized and no activity was allowed in its vicinity. The municipality of Podgorica declared the river canyon a "natural monument" in 2017. Environmental organizations argue that despite their formal commitment to protect the river's basin, Montenegrin authorities have consistently allowed sewage pollution, gravel exploitation and unauthorized construction. In the lower part, beyond the canyon, industrialized agriculture and the Podgorica landfill have contributed to the deterioration of surrounding land quality. After the split of Tuzi from Podgorica, across which the Cem flows, the municipality of Tuzi voted in 2018 in favor of a resolution on the protection of the river.

As a result of climate change inflow and outflow from the Cem steadily decreased during the 2010s.

== Economy ==
Economic activities and development in settlements in Cem's basin are deeply affected by the ecosystem of the river. Communities along the river rely on agriculture, livestock and alpine forestry. Small-scale, sustainable trout farming has developed in recent years. In Albania, Kelmend was before the 1990s a key area of wood production. In Montenegro, soil fertility of the river basin has allowed viticulture to develop. Plantaže owns on the banks of Cem one of the largest vineyards in the region with around 11.5 million grapevines. Seasonal workers cross the border in the season of the year when farming and forestry require extra workforce.

The collapse of the economies of the Eastern Bloc had a profound economic effect upon both countries. Many agricultural cooperatives shut down and public services deteriorated during the 1990s and 2000s. As a result, there is a heavy migration flow towards Italy, Greece and particularly the US, where a large community from Tuzi and Malësia lives in Detroit.

In Kelmend, a slow and gradual reorganization of the economy happened in the 2000s and 2010s with an orientation towards ecologically sustainable development. Medicinal agriculture and alpine tourism were developed, which have become an important source of income for many villages.

== History ==
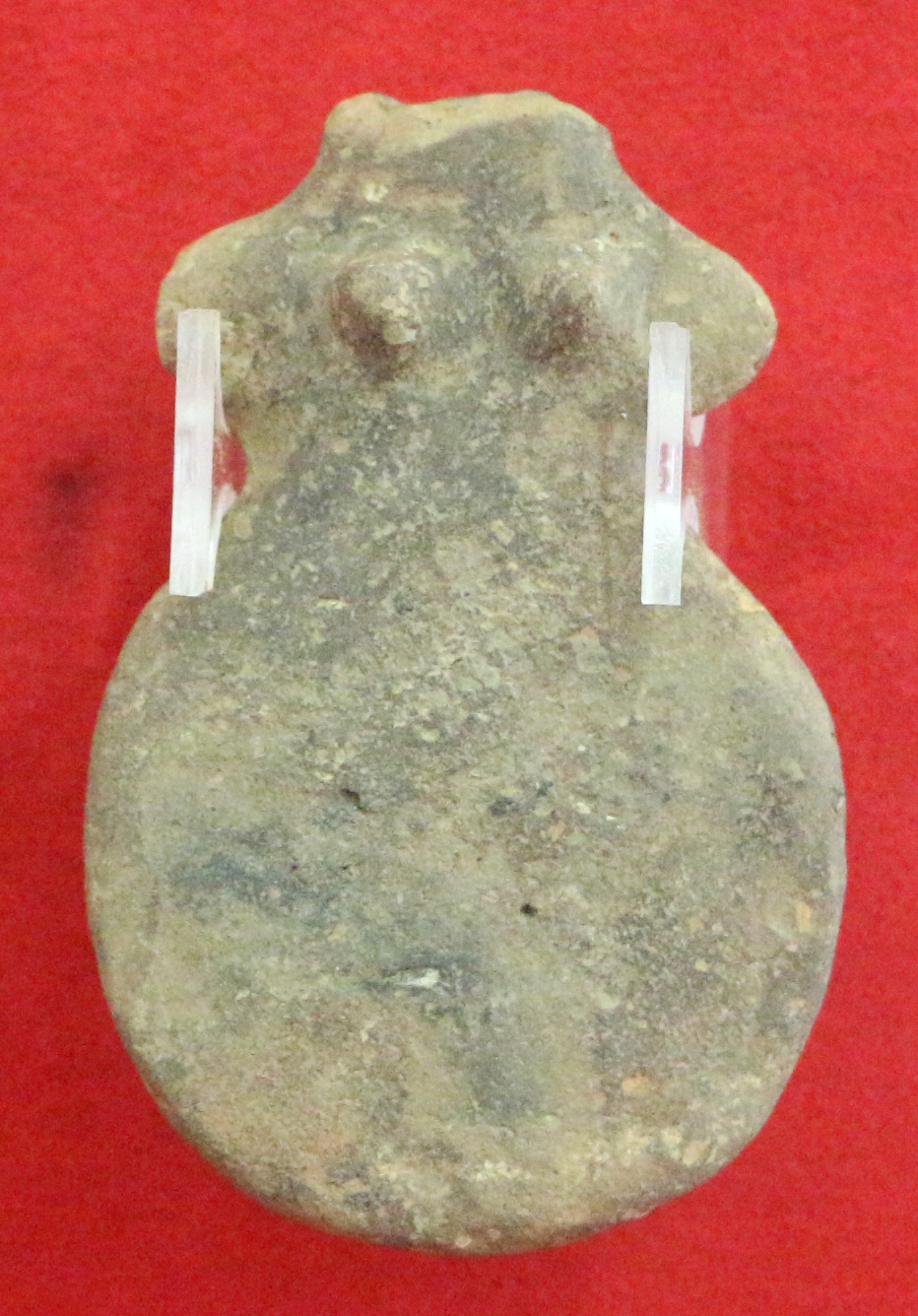
Figurine from Rakića Kuće, 3500-2300 BC

Human activity in the Cem basin has been recorded since the late Copper Age. The tumulus of Rakića Kuće in Tuzi contained nine skeletons and clay figurines with some anthropomorphic attributes. The area of Tuzi remained settled in the Bronze Age. Tumuli and burial artifacts have been found around Dinosha and Lopari in the period that ranges from the Bronze Age to the Hellenistic Period.

Illyrian tribes lived in the Cem river basin in classical antiquity. The best known in recorded history are the Labeatae and Docleatae. Artefacts from this era have been excavated in Selcë, where a hoard of coins that were minted by king Gentius (181-168 BC) was found. Reports on these findings were first published by the archaeologist Arthur Evans in 1880.

During the Roman period, the Cem region served as a route between the urbanized centers of the Roman Balkans in the province of Praevalitana. Water from the river was transported to Doclea to supply local Roman townships from the 1st to the 6th century AD. Some traces of fortifications from this era remain. The 6th-century historian Procopius mentions the fort Clementiana which may be connected to modern-day Kelmend. The fort system was created after the Ostrogothic invasion of Dalmatia in the late 5th century, which turned former Praevalitana into a border area of the Eastern Roman Empire. Justinian secured the area in the Gothic War in 535.

Avar-Slavic raids and incursions caused the destruction of many post-Roman routes and urban centers. The Slavic state of Duklja emerged in the 11th century in the region and later became part of Raška and the Serbian Empire. The Venetian Republic appeared as the dominant force in the late 14th century. Until the consolidation of Ottoman rule in the 15th century, the Zeta plain and the Cem were a borderland between Venice, the Principality of Zeta and local Albanian tribes (fise) and rulers.

The Albanian fis pattern of settlements on the banks of the Cem continued in the Ottoman period and even after the division of the river between Montenegro and Albania in the Balkan Wars. The Ottomans placed the Cem area under the jurisdiction of the Sanjak of Scutari to control the Catholic clans of Malësia. Nevertheless, in practice local communities were semi-autonomous throughout the era. The Selcë Cem and the Vukël Cem formed part of the territory of the Kelmendi tribe. As Cem passes into modern Montenegro in Grabom, the settlements of right-bank Cem were part of Triepshi. The villages of left-bank Cem were part of Hoti and beyond that point, the area belonged to Gruda.

Historical accounts of the Cem increased in the second half of the 19th century as the political rivalry of the Great Powers affected the region and the Principality of Montenegro expanded into Ottoman territory. The Congress of Berlin in 1878 awarded Triepshi to Montenegro but this decision was met with resistance there, as was the ultimately annulled annexation of Tuzi by Montenegro, so the border area remained undefined until the Balkan Wars. For the next 30 years the Cem basin was fought over by the Ottomans, the Montenegrin Principality and the Albanian national movement, with ever-changing tactical alliances between those forces due to the involvement of Great Powers, Austria and Russia. Of the many campaigns, battles and skirmishes of that period, the battle on the hill of Deçiq in the Albanian revolt of 1911 against the Ottomans is marked as one of the better known and important events. It is possibly the first time during which the Albanian flag was hoisted in battle since the 15th century. It was hoisted by Ded Gjo Luli of Hoti.

The London Peace Conference of 1912-1913 set the Albanian-Montenegrin border which remains to this day the boundary that divides the Cem. Part of the population from the villages around the Cem that became part of Montenegro, moved to Albania in the years that followed the demarcation and founded villages like Hot i Ri (New Hoti) in 1932 and Gruda e Re (New Gruda) in 1930 across the border near Shkodër, in the area which is now known as Rrethinat. In 1941, the Montenegrin part of the Cem basin was placed under Albanian control by Fascist Italy as part of its campaign to gain local support for its protectorate over Albania. After the war, the 1912-1913 demarcation line was re-established as the border between the two countries.

== Settlements ==
Cem as a symbol is found on the municipal emblem of Tuzi

The Cem traverses the Kelmend and Tuzi municipalities in Albania and Montenegro respectively as well as some settlements in Podgorica municipality (Mitrovići, Mojanovići, Mahala, and Ljajkovići). Kelmend has a population of about 3,000, Tuzi 12,000 and the total population of the settlements near Podgorica is about 4,700.

Kelmend is Albanian and Catholic. In Tuzi, two thirds of the population are Catholic Albanians and some are Muslim Albanians, while the rest are Orthodox Montenegrins and Muslim Bosniaks. In Mitrovići, Mojanovići, Mahala and Ljajkovići about 85% are Orthodox Montenegrins and 15% Orthodox Serbs.

Over the years, the Cem basin has experienced heavy migration towards Europe and the USA. The two principal municipalities of the area, Kelmend and Tuzi, have been greatly affected by the population drain of emigration. The urban agglomeration of Podgorica is spreading towards where the Cem meets the Morača.

The Cem's significance in the region is reflected in the use of the river as a symbol of both state institutions and non-state organizations. Tuzi municipality uses the river in its flag and in Ljajkovići, the local football club (FK Bratstvo Cijevna) is named after it.

== Gallery ==
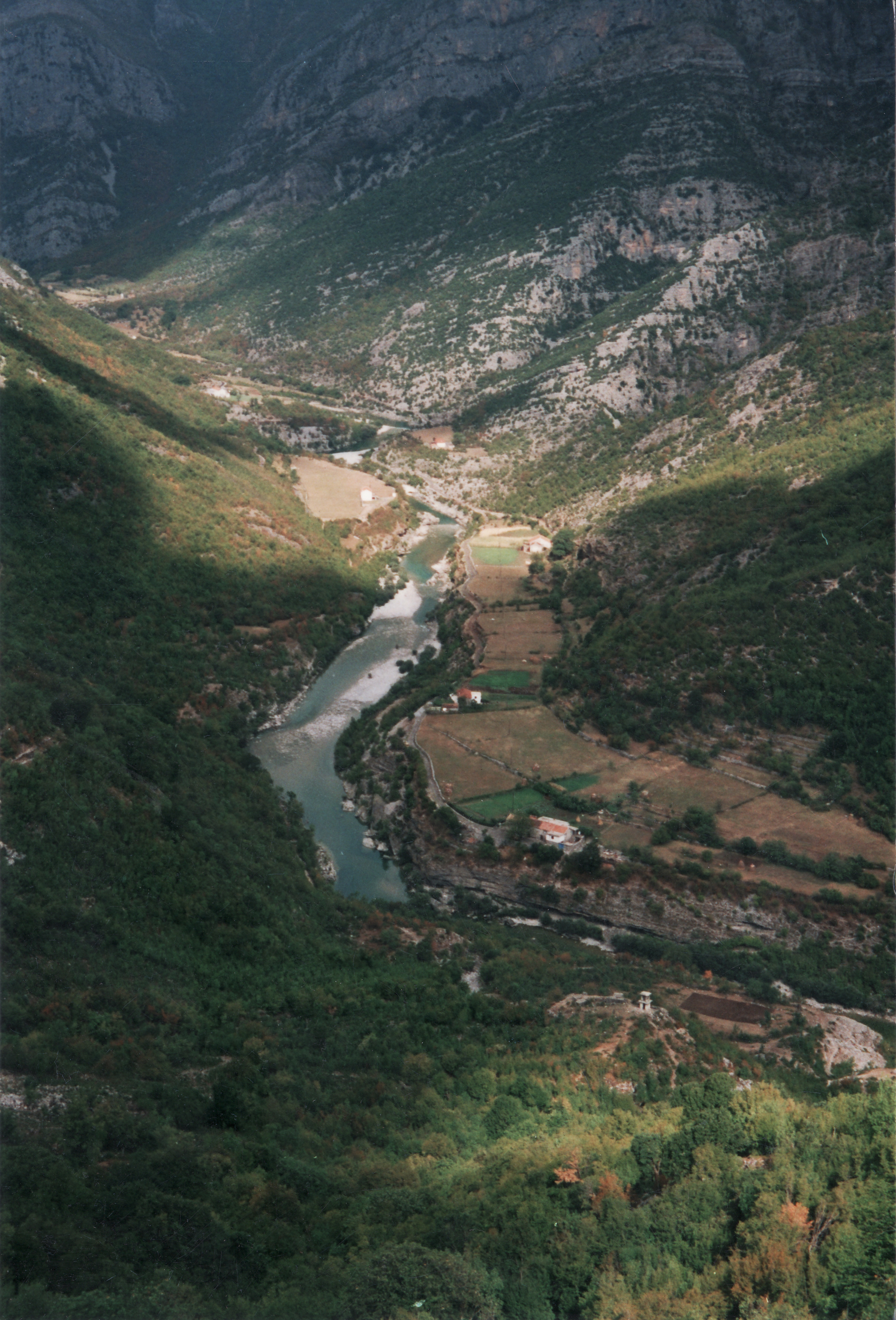
The valley of the Cijevna above the Montenegrin-Albanian border

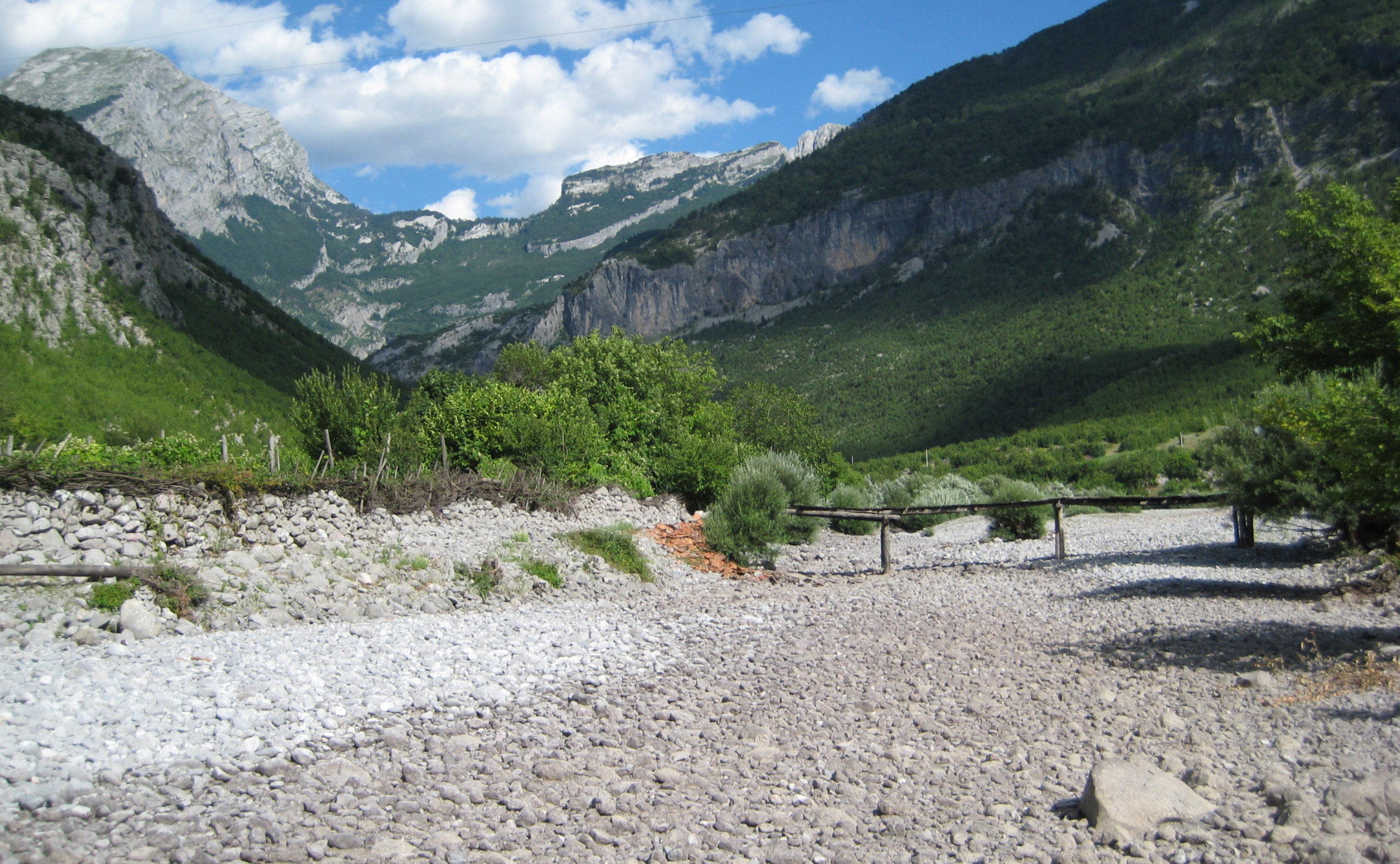
The dried out riverbed of the Cem i Vuklit, Albania

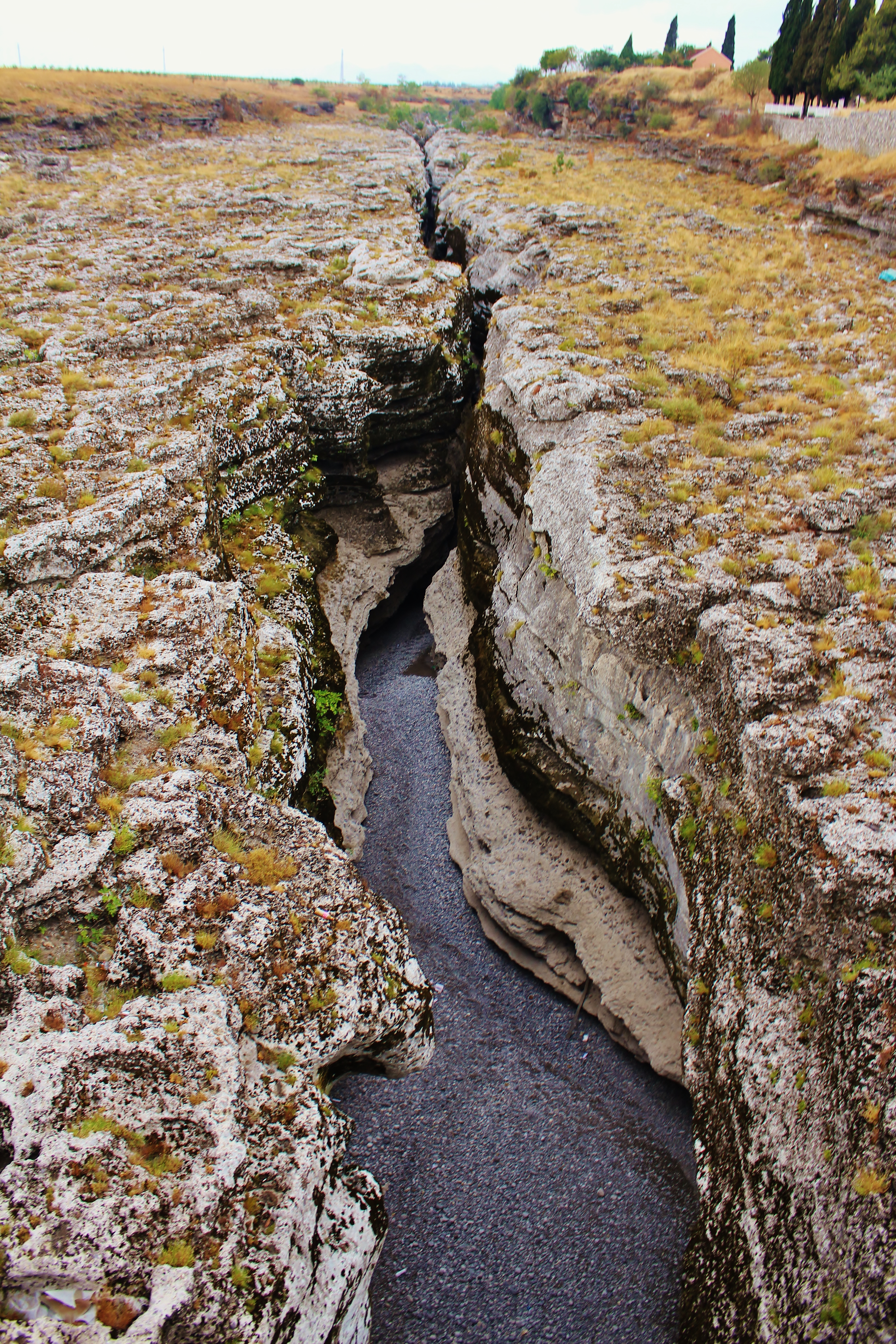
The Cem River Canyon, Tuzi, Montenegro

== See also ==
- List of rivers in Albania
- List of rivers in Montenegro

== Bibliography ==
- Ahrens, Geert-Hinrich (2007). Diplomacy on the Edge: Containment of Ethnic Conflict and the Minorities Working Group of the Conferences on Yugoslavia. Johns Hopkins University Press. ISBN 9780801885570.
- Anđić, Branko (2018). "Fissidens fontanus, a new species to Montenegro". Lindbergia. 41: 01094. doi:10.25227/linbg.01094. S2CID 133725916.
- Axhemi, Sokol (11 June 2019). "Heritage of borderland and population development trends in the cross-border area of Albania-Montenegro" (PDF). Studia z Geografii Politycznej i Historycznej. 7 (7): 283–292. doi:10.18778/2300-0562.07.12. S2CID 199094987. Archived from the original (PDF) on 11 May 2021.
- Bugaj, Urszula (2013). "Bronze-Age stone tumuli on Planinica hill, obs. Tuzi, Montenegro". Sprawozdania Archeologiczne. 65: 427–433.
- Dhora, Dhimitër (2016). "Liqeni i Shkodrës [Lake of Shkodra]" (PDF). University of Shkodra.
- Djurović, Predrag; Petrović, Aleksandar (2007). "Large Canyons in Dinaric and Prokletije Mountains Region of Montenegro" (PDF). Geographica Pannonica. 11 (11): 14–18. doi:10.5937/GeoPan0711014D. Archived from the original (PDF) on 13 October 2020.
- Fine, John Van Antwerp (1994). The Late Medieval Balkans: A Critical Survey from the Late Twelfth Century to the Ottoman Conquest. University of Michigan Press. ISBN 978-0-472-08260-5.
- Kamusella, Tomasz (2008). The Politics of Language and Nationalism in Modern Central Europe. Springer. ISBN 978-0230583474.
- Kodhelaj, Saidjon; Hasalami, Agim (2019). "Environmental Assessment Plan of Hydropower Station "Ura e Tamarës"" (PDF). Agjencia Kombëtare e Mjedisit [National Environmental Agency] (in Albanian). Archived from the original (PDF) on 2021-12-24.
- Lulgjuraj, Anton (2019). "PREHISTORIC FORTIFICATION IN LOPARI AND GRAVEYARD IN DINOSHA VILLAGE (MONTENEGRO)". Anglisticum Journal. 8 (4). doi:10.5281/zenodo.2886234.
- Marojević, Jelena (2014). "Plani i veprimit të përbashkët për mbrojtjen ekologjike të lumit Cem dhe zhvillimi i qendrueshëm mjedisor në zonën ndërkufitare [Mapping of common action plan for trans-border protection of Cem]" (PDF). GreenHome. Albania-Montenegro CrossBorder Cooperation Programme. Archived from the original (PDF) on 31 December 2019.
- Mayer, Anton (1957). Die Sprache der alten Illyrier. In Kommission bei R. M. Rohrer.
- Meco, Marjol; Ndoj, Eriselda; Nika, Olsi; Miho, Aleko (2014), Vështrim mbi cilësinë biologjike të ujërave sipërfaqësore shqiptare, University of Tirana
- Méndez, María; Donázar, José (2015). "Genetic analysis of Egyptian vulture (Neophron percnopterus) in the Balkans and Turkey" (PDF). Life+ Project. LIFE+ project “The Return of the Neophron”.
- Mitrović, Luka (2019). "The impact of the climate change on the groundwater regime in the area of the Podgorica-Shkodër Basin". Regionalni Vodovod Crnogorsko Primorje.
- Mrdak, Duško; Hadžiablahović, Sead (2015). "STUDIJA ZAŠTITE ZA SPOMENIK PRIRODE "KANJON CIJEVNE [Environmental protection study of the natural monument "Kanjon Cijevne"] - chapters on Geology and Flora" (PDF). Agencija za zaštitu životne sredine Crne Gore [Environmental Protection Agency of Montenegro]. Archived from the original (PDF) on 4 January 2020.
- Odile, Daniel (1989). "Montagnes Tribales et Coutumiers". L'Ethnographie. 2.
- Radulović, Vasilije (1997). "The waters of the Lake Skadar and its neighbouring aquifers as water supplying sources". Prirodne Vrijednosti i Zaštita Skadarskog Jezera: Radovi Su Naučnog Skupa: Podgorica, 8-9. Novembar 1995. ISBN 9788672150889.
- Rustja, Dritan (2014), HAPËSIRA PERIURBANE E SHKODRËS: PËRDORIMI I TERRITORIT DHE VEÇORITË E ZHVILLIMIT SOCIAL-EKONOMIK [The Suburbia of Shkodra: Land Use and Details of Social and Economic Growth] (PDF), University of Tirana, archived from the original (PDF) on 22 January 2021
- Selami, Hasan (1972). "Prerjet monetare të Skodrës, Lisit dhe Gentit (Përpjekje për një rishqyrtim të problemit". Iliria. 2: 351–376. doi:10.3406/iliri.1972.1148.
- Singleton, Fred (1985). A Short History of the Yugoslav Peoples. Cambridge University Press. p. 183. ISBN 9780511608070.
- Šufflay, Milan (2000). Izabrani politički spisi. Matica hrvatska. ISBN 9789531502573.
- Verli, Marenglen (2014). "The role of Hoti in the uprising of the Great Highlands". Studime Historike (1–2).
- von Hahn, Johan Georg; Elsie, Robert (2015). The Discovery of Albania: Travel Writing and Anthropology in the Nineteenth Century. I. B. Tauris. ISBN 978-1784532925.
- Vukotić, Vukota (2019). "Litteratura Praevalitana - Form of Literature from the 1st to the 7th century". Muzejski Glasnik. 14.
