= Gheg Albanian =

One of two major varieties of the Albanian language

Gheg
- Geg
- gegnisht
- Region: Albania, Kosovo, North Macedonia, Montenegro, Serbia
- Native speakers: 4.1 million (2012–2021)
- Language family: Indo-European: Albanoid; Albanian; Gheg
- Early form: Proto-Albanian
- Dialects: Istrian Albanian †; Arbanasi; Northeastern Gheg; Northwestern Gheg; Central Gheg; Upper Reka; Northern Gheg; Southern Gheg

Language codes
- ISO 639-3: aln
- Glottolog: gheg1238
- Linguasphere: 55-AAA-aa
- A map showing Gheg speakers in green.

Gheg (Gheg Albanian: gegnisht, Standard Albanian: gegërisht) is one of the two major varieties of Albanian, the other being Tosk. The geographic dividing line between the two varieties is the Shkumbin River, which winds its way through central Albania. Gheg is spoken in northern and central Albania, Kosovo, northwestern North Macedonia, southeastern Montenegro and southern Serbia by the Albanian dialectal subgroup known as Ghegs.

Gheg does not have any official status as a written language in any country. Publications in Kosovo and North Macedonia are in Standard Albanian, which is based on Tosk. However, some authors continue to write in Gheg.

== History ==
Before World War II, there had been no official attempt to enforce a unified Albanian literary language; both literary Gheg and literary Tosk were used. The communist regime in Albania imposed nationwide a standard that was based on the variant of Tosk spoken in and around the city of Korçë.

After WWII, Yugoslavia planned to create a Kosovan language based on the Gheg dialect, in line with Tito's efforts to define nations through language. This was part of a push for union with Albania, but after the 1948 split between Stalin and Tito, the idea was abandoned.

With the warming of relations between Albania and Yugoslavia starting in the late 1960s, the Kosovo Albanians—the largest ethnic group in Kosovo—adopted the same standard in a process that began in 1968 and culminated with the appearance of the first unified Albanian orthographic handbook and dictionary in 1972. Although they had until then used Gheg and almost all Albanian writers in Yugoslavia were Ghegs, they chose to write in Tosk for political reasons.

The change of literary language has had significant political and cultural consequences because the Albanian language is the main criterion for Albanian self identity. The standardization has been criticized, notably by the writer Arshi Pipa, who claimed that the move had deprived Albanian of its richness at the expense of the Ghegs. He referred to literary Albanian as a "monstrosity" produced by the Tosk communist leadership, who had conquered anti-communist northern Albania and imposed their own dialect on the Ghegs.

In 1974, Tosk-based standard Albanian became Kosovo’s official language, though Gheg remains the everyday dialect used by most Kosovo Albanians, while standard Albanian is taught in schools and used in media.

== Dialects ==
The Gheg dialect is divided by four sub-dialects: Central Gheg, Southern Gheg, Northwestern Gheg (or Western Gheg), and Northeastern Gheg (or Eastern Gheg).

=== Southern Gheg ===
Southern Gheg is spoken in the ethno-geographic regions of central and, areas of, north-central Albania; among these being:

1. Durrës, which includes its surrounding villages and environs and municipal units of Ishëm and Shijak;
2. Tirana, including the surrounding villages and environs under the municipal units of Petrelë, Dajt, Vorë, Pezë, Ndroq, Zall-Herr, Zall-Bastar, Shëngjergj, Kavajë, and Rrogozhinë (the last two traditionally being grouped with the Durrës region);
3. Elbasan, including its surrounding villages and the settlements under the municipal units of Labinot-Mal, Labinot-Fushë, Bradashesh, Funarë, Krrabë, and Peqin (the last two regions generally speak dialects closer to that of the Durrës and Tirana region); and
4. Librazhd, including the surrounding settlements and those under the ethnographic regions and municipal units of Çermenikë, Qukës, Prrenjas, Hotolisht; and
5. Struga

Southern Gheg can be further broken down into two major groupings: Southwestern Gheg and Southeastern Gheg. The first group includes the dialects spoken in the regions of Durrës, Tirana, Kavajë and sections of Elbasan such as Peqin and the western villages of Krrabë. The latter group, on the other hand, is spoken in the regions of Elbasan, Librazhd, and Martanesh. The spoken dialects of Shëngjergj, in Tirana, and Krrabë, in Elbasan, act as transitional dialects between the two groups, although the former is closer to the Southwestern group and the eastern villages of the latter with the Southeastern group.

The dialects of Ishëm, Vorë, Zall-Herr, and Zall-Dajt represent the northernmost extensions of Southern Gheg (specifically Southwestern Gheg), and as such, they show direct influences from Central Gheg (spoken in neighbouring Krujë, Mat, and Bulqizë); thus they can be labelled as transitional dialects.

Certain settlements to the extreme south of the Southern Gheg dialect zone, which are included in the largely Southern Gheg-speaking units, speak transitional dialects depicting both characteristics of Gheg and Tosk Albanian. These include villages such as Dars in Peqin, the coastal villages of southernmost Kavajë like Rreth-Greth, and a number of settlements in Qukës and Hotolisht.

=== Central Gheg ===
Central Gheg is a sub-dialect of Gheg spoken in the interior basin of the Mat river, extending eastwards to and beyond the Black Drin river, including Kruja and Fushë Kruja, Mati, part of Mirdita, Lurë, Luma and Dibër Valley. Central Gheg is also spoken outside of Albania, with the majority of Albanians from North Macedonia speaking dialects of Central Gheg - including the divergent idiom spoken in Upper Reka. These regions include Polog Valley (Tetovo and Gostivar) and the Southwestern Statistical Region (Kičevo, Debar and parts of Struga).

According to linguists such as Jorgji Gjinari and Xhevat Lloshi, the Central Gheg dialect group represents a sub-group of the larger Southern Gheg zone.

=== Northern Gheg ===
- Northeastern Gheg include the Albanians of Bujanoc, Besianë, Gjilan, Mitrovicë, Medvegjë, Preshevë, Prishtinë, Vushtrri, and the formerly Albanian-populated territories of Niš Sanjak (Niš, Vranje, Toplica District).
- Northwestern Gheg or often called as Prizren old dialect is mostly spoken in Prizren, (Shkodër, Shiroka, Vermosh, Selcë, Vukël, Lëpushë, Nikç, Tamarë, Tuzi, Shestani-Kraja, Ulcinj, Bar, Plav, Gusinje, Pejë, Gjakovë, Lezhë and the rest of Malësia)
- One isolated and particularly divergent Northwestern dialect: the Arbanasi dialect of diaspora Albanians in Croatia

The Italian linguist Carlo Tagliavini puts the Gheg of Kosovo and North Macedonia in Eastern Gheg.

==== Northeastern Gheg ====
Northeastern Gheg, sometimes known as Eastern Gheg, is a variant or sub-dialect of Gheg Albanian spoken in Northeastern Albania, Kosovo, and Serbia.

The Northeastern Gheg dialectal area begins roughly down from the eastern Montenegrin-Albanian border, including the Albanian districts (Second-level administrative country subdivisions) of Tropojë, Pukë, Has, Mirditë and Kukës; the whole of Kosovo^{[a]}, and the municipalities of Bujanovac and Preševo in Serbia. The tribes in Albania speaking the dialect include Nikaj-Merturi, Puka, Gashi, and Tropoja.

The Albanian speech in roughly around Skopje, Karadak, and Kumanovo in North Macedonia, is sometimes regarded part of Northeastern Gheg.

Calques of Serbian origin are evident in the areas of syntax and morphology. The Northeastern Gheg slightly differs from Northwestern Gheg (spoken in Shkodër), as the pronunciation is deeper and more prolonged. Northeastern Gheg is considered to be the autonomous branch of Gheg Albanian in turn, the Northeastern Gheg dialects themselves differ greatly among themselves.

The dialect is also split in a few other minority dialects, where the phoneme [y] of standard Albanian is pronounced as [i], i.e. "ylberi" to "ilberi" (both meaning rainbow); "dy" to "di" (both meaning two). In Northeastern Gheg, the palatal stops of standard Albanian, such as [c] (as in qen, "dog") and [ɟ] (as in gjumë, "sleep"), are realised as palato-alveolar affricates, [t͡ʃ] and [d͡ʒ] respectively.

==== Northwestern Gheg ====
Northwestern Gheg, sometimes known as Western Gheg, is a sub-dialect of Gheg Albanian spoken in Northwestern Albania and Southern Montenegro. The tribes that speak this dialect are the Malësor, Dukagjin and other highlander tribes which include (Malësia): Hoti, Gruda, Triepshi, Kelmendi, Kastrati, Shkreli, Lohja, etc., (Dukagjin) : Shala, Shoshi, Shllaku, Dushmani, etc., etc..(Lezhë),...(see Tribes of Albania).

The main contrast between Northwestern Gheg and Northeastern Gheg is the slight difference in the tone and or pronunciation of the respective dialects. Northwestern Gheg does not have the more deeper sounding a's, e's, etc. and is considered by some to sound slightly more soft and clear in tone compared to Northeastern Gheg, yet still spoken with a rough Gheg undertone compared to the Southern Albanian dialects. Other differences include different vocabulary, and the use of words like "kon" (been), and "qysh" (how?) which are used in Northeastern Gheg, and not often used in Northwestern Gheg. Instead Northwestern Gheg speakers say "kjen o ken" (been), and use the adverb "si" to say (how?). For example in Northeastern Gheg to say "when I was young", you would say, "kur jam kon i ri", while in Northwestern Gheg you would say "kur kam ken i ri, kur jam ken i ri.". Although there is a degree of variance, Northwestern Gheg and Northeastern Gheg are still very much similar, and speakers of both sub-dialects have no problem understanding and having a conversation with one another.

===== Malsia Albanian =====
The Northwestern Gheg subdialect encompasses three main Albanian ethnographic regions: Malësia e Madhe, Shkodër and Lezhë. Within the Northwestern Gheg, the area of Malësia e Madhe shows different phonological, syntactic, and lexical patterns than the areas of Shkodër and Lezhë. For this reason, Malsia e Madhe Albanian (MMA) can be considered a distinct variety of Northwestern Gheg. The different features of this variety can be traced to the historical and geographic isolation of the mountainous region of Malësia e Madhe (Albanian for 'Great Highlands').

The early isolated Malsia Albanian has preserved archaic features of Proto-Albanian and Proto-Indo-European in comparison to other Gheg varieties and to Tosk, such as the word-initial voiceless and voiced stops. Whereas Tosk Albanian has homorganic nasal-stop clusters, having produced a shift from the proto form that featured a word-initial stop to a nasal-stop cluster, which was achieved by placing a prefix en- (< PAlb preposition *en 'in'). Gheg Albanian is in a transitional position, featuring nasals that resulted from reduced nasal-stop clusters.

Malsia word-initial stop vs. the innovation of nasal-stop clusters in other dialects
PIE	Malsia	Tosk	Gheg
*peh₂- 'protect'	pɔ:j 'to hold, keep'	mbaj 'hold, carry'	mɔ:j
*bʰer- 'bear, carry'	bɔ:j 'carry'	mbaj 'hold, carry'	mɔ:j
*ten 'stretch, tighten'	tæ̃:n 'push, press'	ndej 'hold, carry'	
*deh₂- 'share, divide'	dɔ: 'split, cut, divide'	ndaj	dɔ:
*gʰodʰ-, (o-grade of *gʰedʰ-)	gæ: 'time, chance, opportunity'	ŋge	

Examples of the formation of nasal-stop clusters by placing the prefix en- with unstressed word-initial vowel are: Tosk mbuʃa 'to fill', from PAlb *en-busa (vs. Malsia buʃa); Tosk ŋga 'where, from where', from PAlb *en-ka (vs. Malsia ka); Tosk ŋgula 'to thrust, put on point', from PAlb *en-kula (vs. Malsia ku:ʎ); Tosk ndej 'to stretch', from PAlb *en-tenja (vs. Malsia tæ̃:n).

The PAlb preposition *en 'in' has been preserved solely in the Malsia Albanian dialect, whereas in the other Gheg varieties and in Tosk it has been reanalyzed as a prefix attached to other lexical terms, no longer existing as a preposition.

== Phonology ==
Assimilations are common in Gheg but are not part of the Albanian literary language, which is a standardized form of Tosk Albanian.

=== Vowels ===
There are 26 vowels in Gheg. These are /a e i o u y/, which may occur long or short, oral or nasal. In addition there's the schwa, /ə/ (orthographic ë), which is only short and oral, and in northwestern and southern dialects /ø/ (orthographic œ), which is only long and oral in the northwestern dialects /øː/.

== Examples ==
Standard	Tosk	Cham	Arbëresh	South Gheg	Central Gheg	Northeastern Gheg	Northwestern Gheg	English
Shqipëri		Shkjipërí		Shqipni		Shqypëni/Shqipëni		"Albania"
Një				Nji/ni/i/njo/nja		Nji/njo	Nja, nji	"One"
Bëj			Bunj	Boj		Bâj, boj	Bâj	"I do"
Qenë	Qënë	Klënë		Qenë	Qanë	Kânë	Kenë	"Been"
Pleqëri	Pleqrĩ	Plekjërí		Pleqni		Pleqni		"Old age"
Është	Është or Ësht'	Është	Isht or ë	Osht/Âsht		Âsht/Osht	Âsht	"Is"
Nëntë				Nônt/Nônd		Nân(d)ë	Nând	"Nine"
Shtëpi			Shpi	Shpí	Shp(e)j	Shp(a)j/Shpi, Shpí	Shp(e)i	"Home"

== See also ==
- Albanian dialects
- Arbëresh language
- Arvanitika
- Cham Albanian dialect

== Bibliography ==
- Dedvukaj, Lindon; Ndoci, Rexhina (2023). "Linguistic variation within the Northwestern Gheg Albanian dialect". Proceedings of the Linguistic Society of America. 8 (1). Linguistic Society of America. doi:10.3765/plsa.v8i1.5501.
- Dedvukaj, Lindon; Gehringer, Patrick (2023). "Morphological and phonological origins of Albanian nasals and its parallels with other laws". Proceedings of the Linguistic Society of America. 8 (1). Linguistic Society of America. doi:10.3765/plsa.v8i1.5508.
- Pipa, Arshi; Repishti, Sami (1984). Studies on Kosova. East European Monographs #155. ISBN 0880330473.
- Elsie, Robert. "Albanian Dialects". Archived from the original on 7 May 2012.
