= Kelmend =

Kelmend may refer to:

- Kelmend (region)
- Kelmend (municipality)

== See also ==
- Kelmendi (tribe)
