= Tirana dialect =

Dialect of the Albanian language

The Tirana dialect (Albanian: Dialekti i Tiranës, in dialect Dialekti i Tironës) of the Albanian language is spoken by Albanians who were raised in Tirana and is part of Southern Gheg dialect of Elbasanisht.
