= Grabom =

- Village
- Location within Albania
- Coordinates: 42°25′19″N 19°30′36″E
- Country: Albania
- County: Shkodër
- Municipality: Malësi e Madhe
- Administrative unit: Kelmend
- Time zone: UTC+1 (CET)
  - Summer (DST): UTC+2 (CEST)

Grabom is a settlement near Brojë in the former Kelmend municipality, Shkodër County, northern Albania. Near this village a new border crossing point between Albania and Montenegro is planned.

== Gallery ==
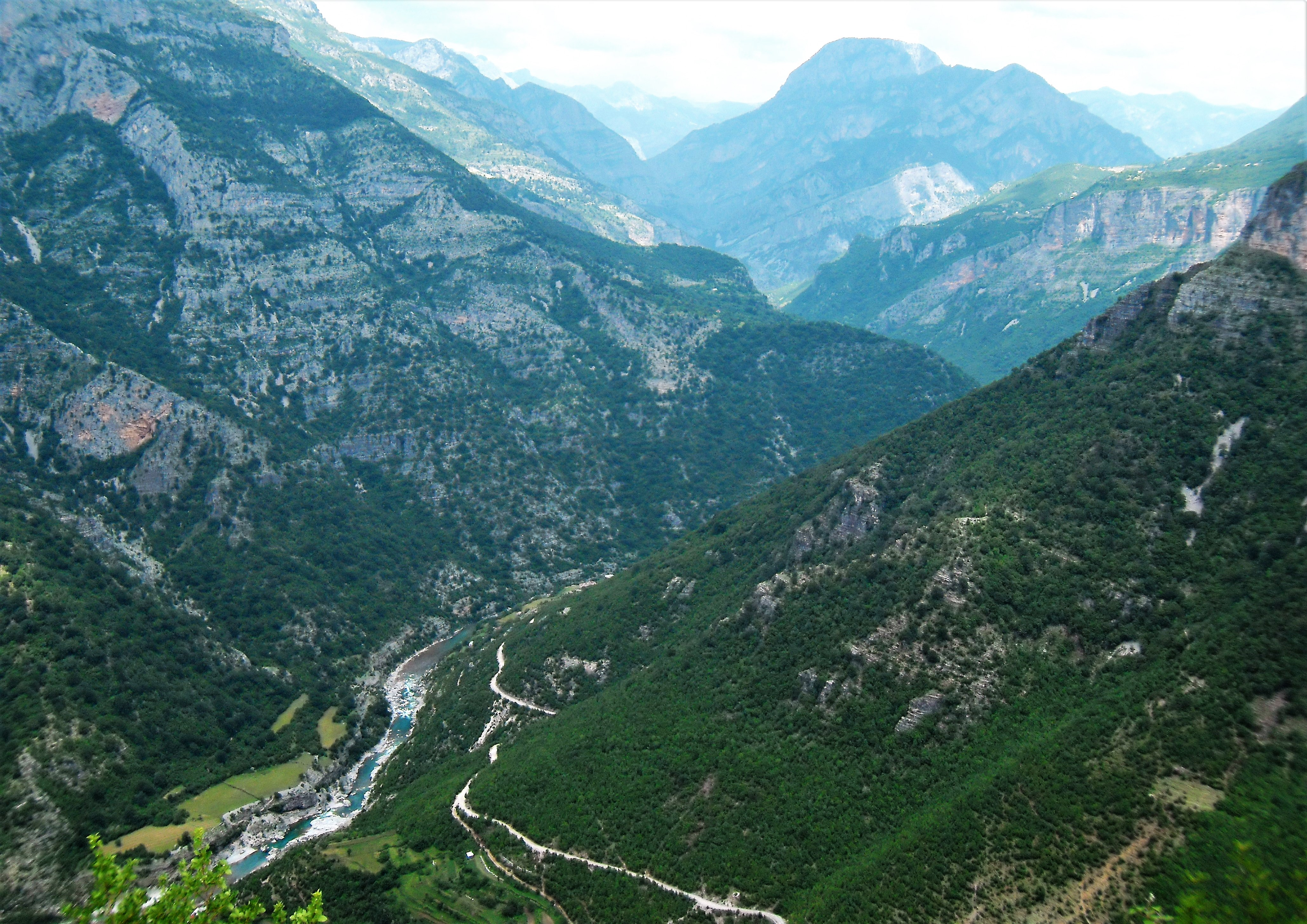
View from Broje
