= Split–Karlovac Fault =

Seismic fault in Croatia

The Split–Karlovac Fault is a major fault line in Croatia. It extends from Split in the south to Karlovac in the north. The faults movements are dextral-transpressive, with the eastern block thrusting towards the west. The fault was active during the Miocene. It runs mostly within the High Karst Unit.
