= Kozhnjë e Sipërme =

- Village
- Location within Albania
- Coordinates: 42°26′36″N 19°37′49″E
- Country: Albania
- County: Shkodër
- Municipality: Malësi e Madhe
- Administrative unit: Kelmend
- Time zone: UTC+1 (CET)
  - Summer (DST): UTC+2 (CEST)

Kozhnjë e Sipërme is a settlement in the former Kelmend municipality, Shkodër County, northern Albania.
