= High Karst Unit =

The High Karst Unit (or High Karst Zone) is a tectonic unit in the Balkans region of Southeastern Europe, part of the Dinaric Alps or Dinarides, that is characterized by typical high-altitude karst features. It is found in Slovenia, Croatia, Italy, Bosnia and Herzegovina, Kosovo, Serbia, Montenegro and Albania.

== Geology ==
The High Karst Unit of the External Dinarides is a tectonic unit established by French geologists, so-called Aubouin's group, as reviewed in a recent scientific literature. The unit consists of a highly tectonically deformed carbonate and clastic rock successions deposited between the Upper Carboniferous age of the Carboniferous period in the Mesozoic Era, and the Eocene epoch of the Paleogene period in the Cenozoic Era.

=== Associations ===
In the north the High Karst Unit is overthrust by Southern Alpine units. In the east the Pre-Karst Unit and the Bosnian Flysch overthrust it. The High Karst Unit overthrusts the Dalmatian Zone in the west and the Budva-Cukali Zone in the southwest. In the south the unit is cut off by the Skadar-Peć Fault and borders the Western Vardar Ophiolitic Unit.

== See also ==
- Geologic formations of Europe
- Karst
  - Limestone formations
- Balkans region topics
