= Skadar–Peć Fault =

Fault in Albania and Kosovo

The Skadar–Peć Fault is a fault in Albania and Kosovo. It strikes NE–SW between the cities of Shkodër and Peć. The fault marks the southern limit of the external nappes of the Dinarides, which crop out in the north-west. In the south-east the fault borders the internal nappes of the Dinarides.
