= Vukël =

- Village
- Location within Albania
- Coordinates: 42°29′12″N 19°38′50″E
- Country: Albania
- County: Shkodër
- Municipality: Malësi e Madhe
- Administrative unit: Kelmend
- Time zone: UTC+1 (CET)
  - Summer (DST): UTC+2 (CEST)

Vukël (definite form: Vukli) is a settlement in the former Kelmend municipality, Shkodër County, northern Albania. At the 2015 local government reform it became part of the municipality Malësi e Madhe. Vukel is one of the four original villages of Kelmend. Three of these villages, Selca, Nikçi, and Vukli are located in the Kelmend Commune. Boga is located in Shkreli Comune. Inhabitants of Lepusha Village originated from Vukli village.

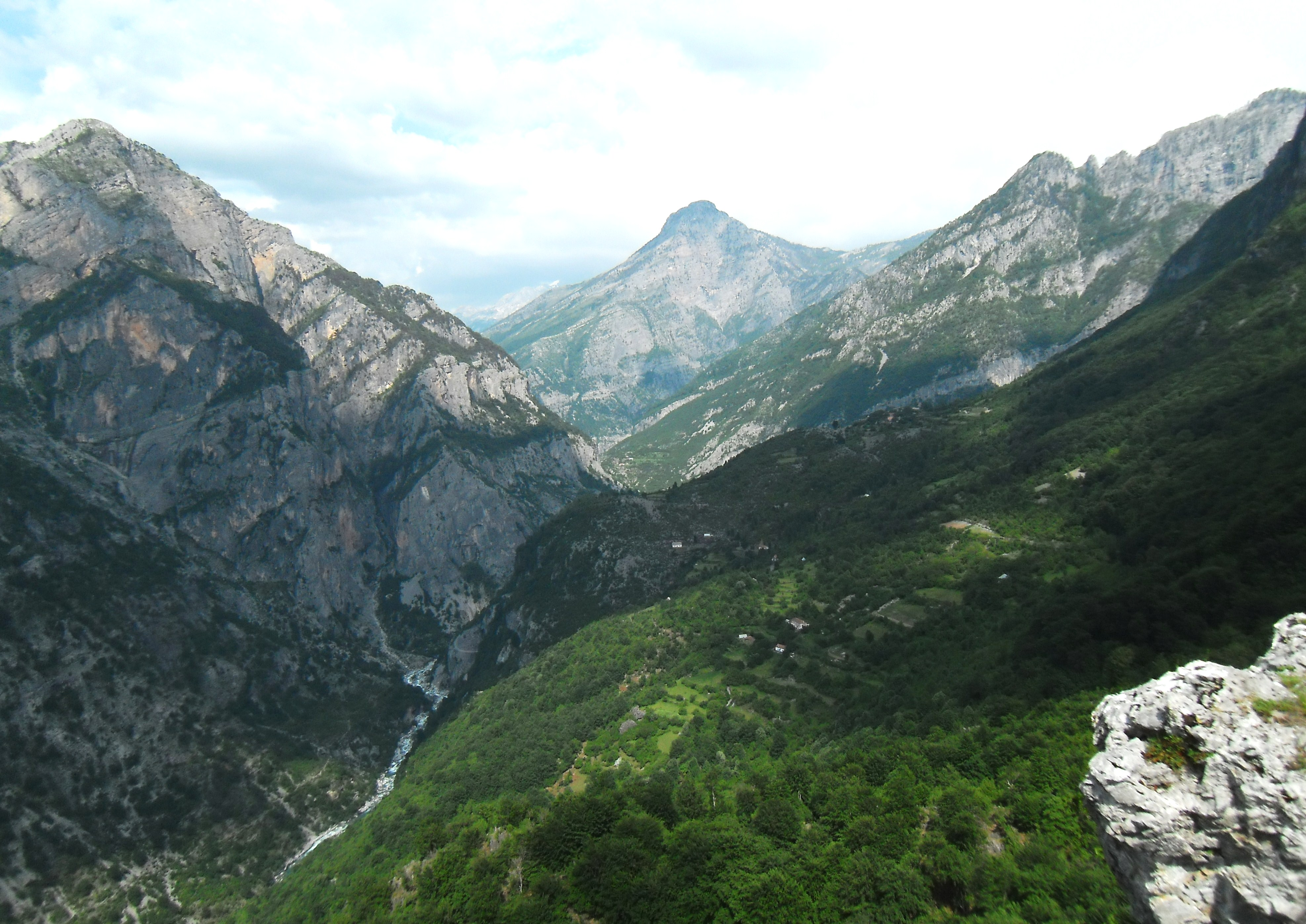
View from Brojë into the Vukël valley

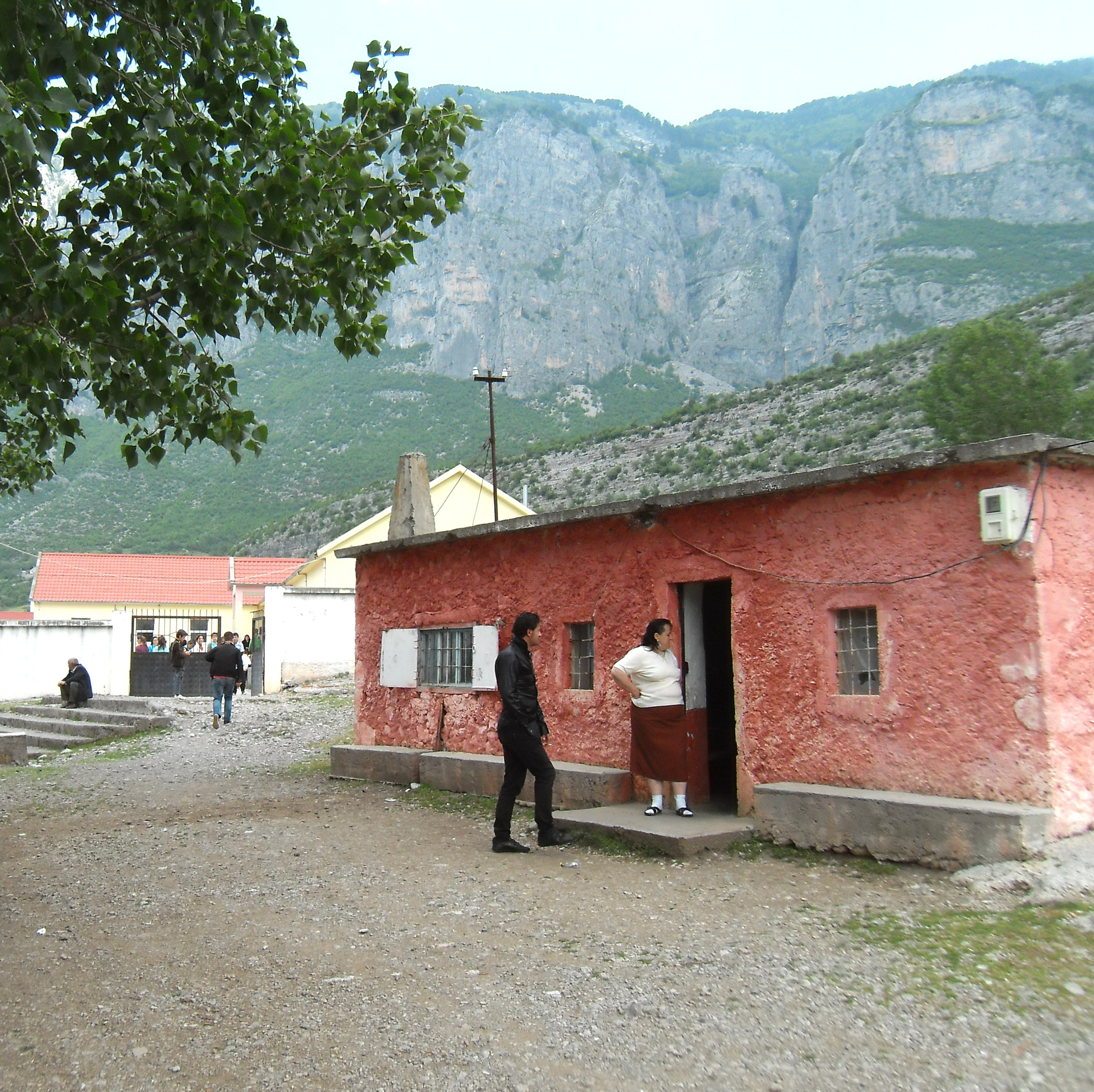
Bar in village center

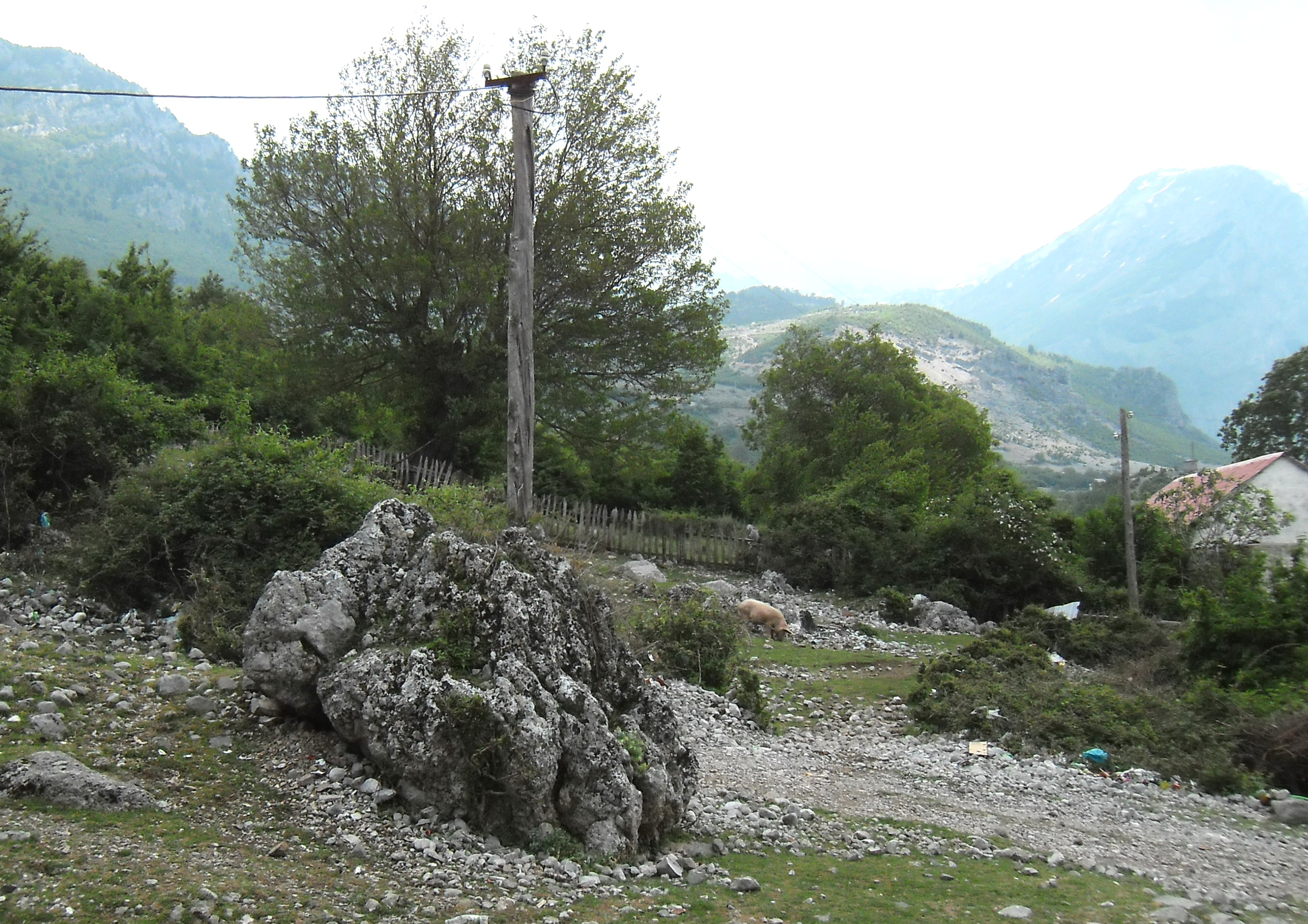
Landscape in Vukël
