= Lëpushë =

- Village
- Location within Albania
- Coordinates: 42°31′46″N 19°43′42″E
- Country: Albania
- County: Shkodër
- Municipality: Malësi e Madhe
- Administrative unit: Kelmend
- Elevation: 1,260 m (4,130 ft)
- Time zone: UTC+1 (CET)
  - Summer (DST): UTC+2 (CEST)

Lëpushë is a settlement in the former Kelmend municipality, Shkodër County, northern Albania. At the 2015 local government reform it became part of the municipality Malësi e Madhe.

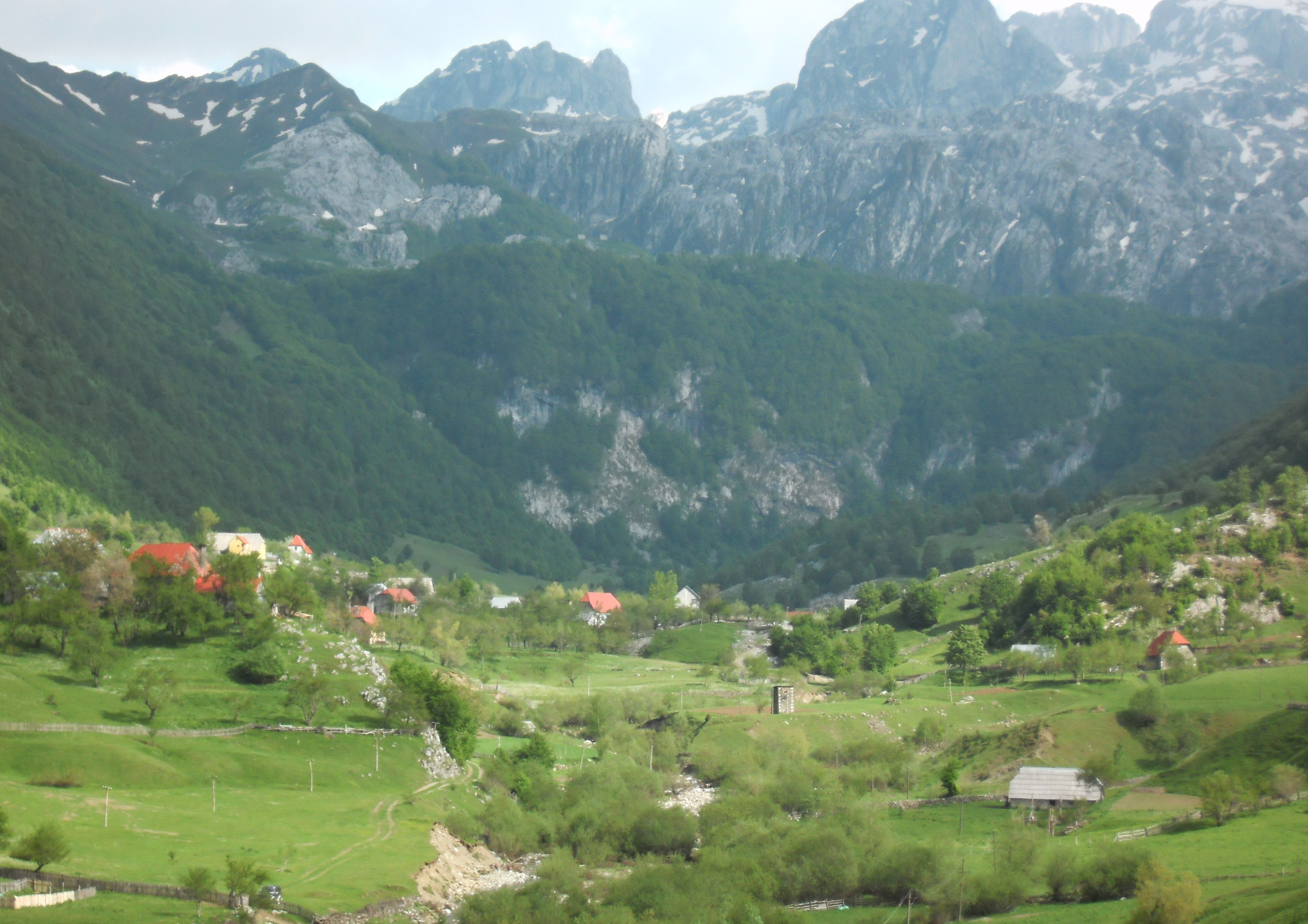
View over the village of Lëpushë

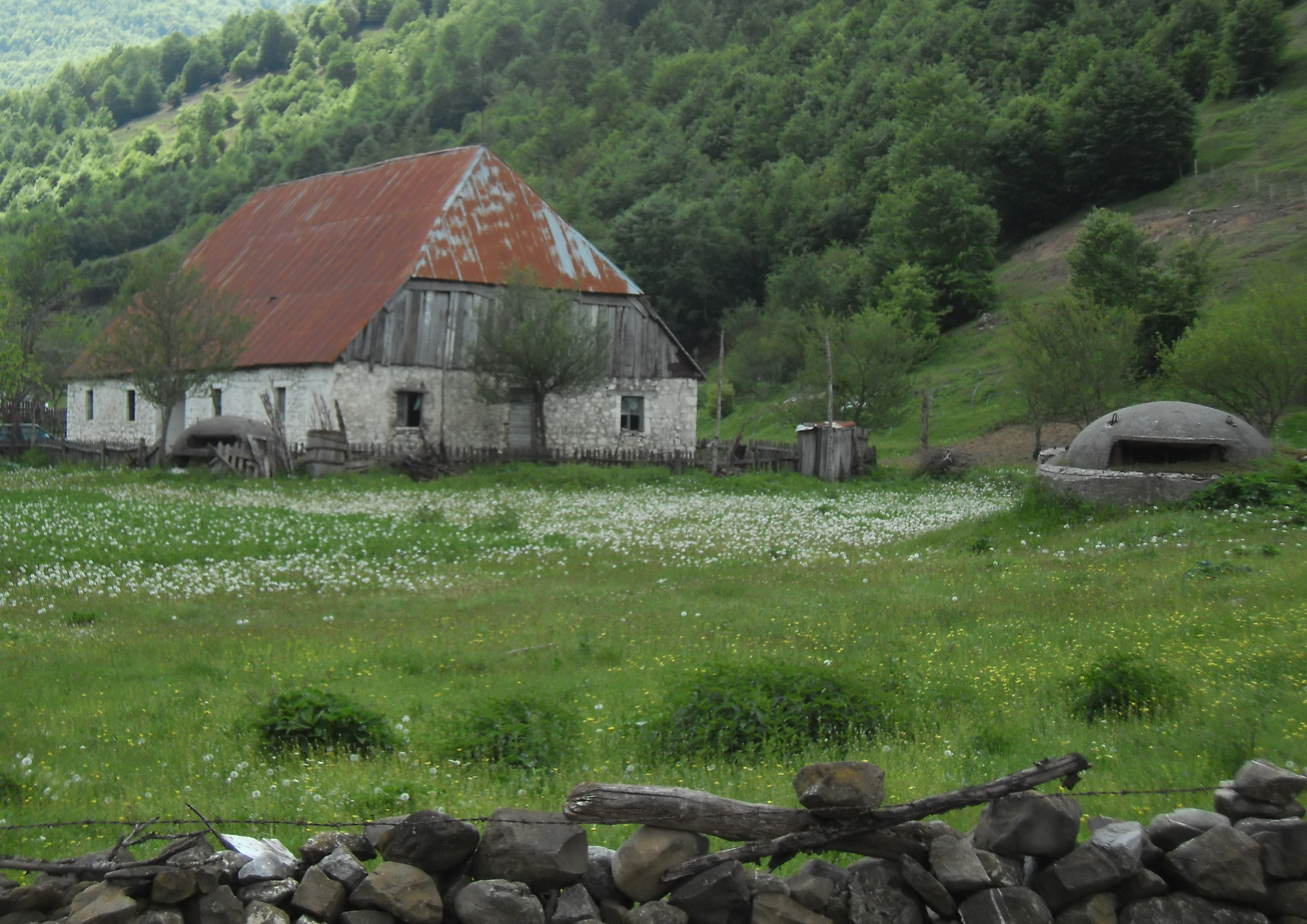
Farmhouse with one-man-bunker

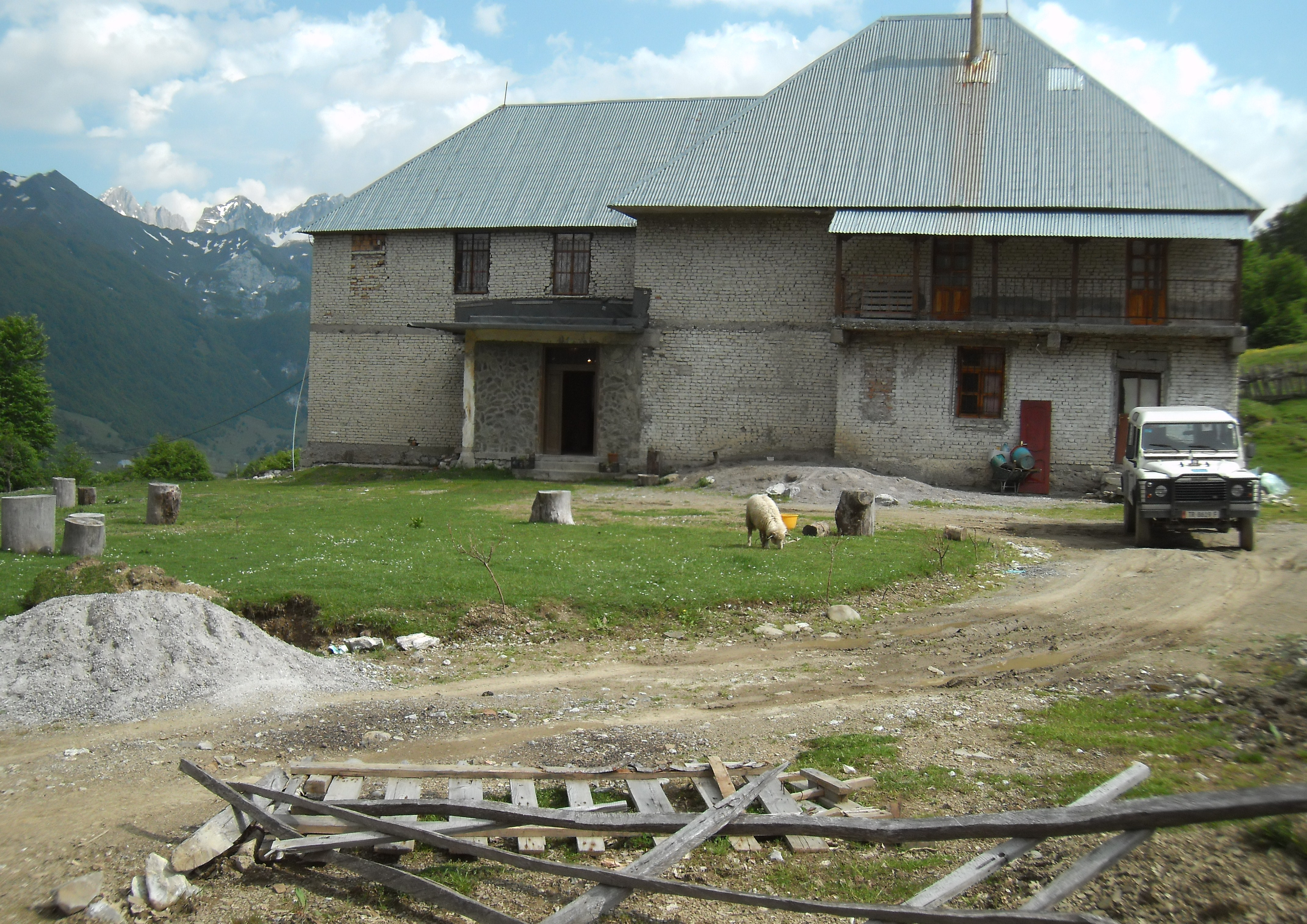
Simple hotel in Lëpushë

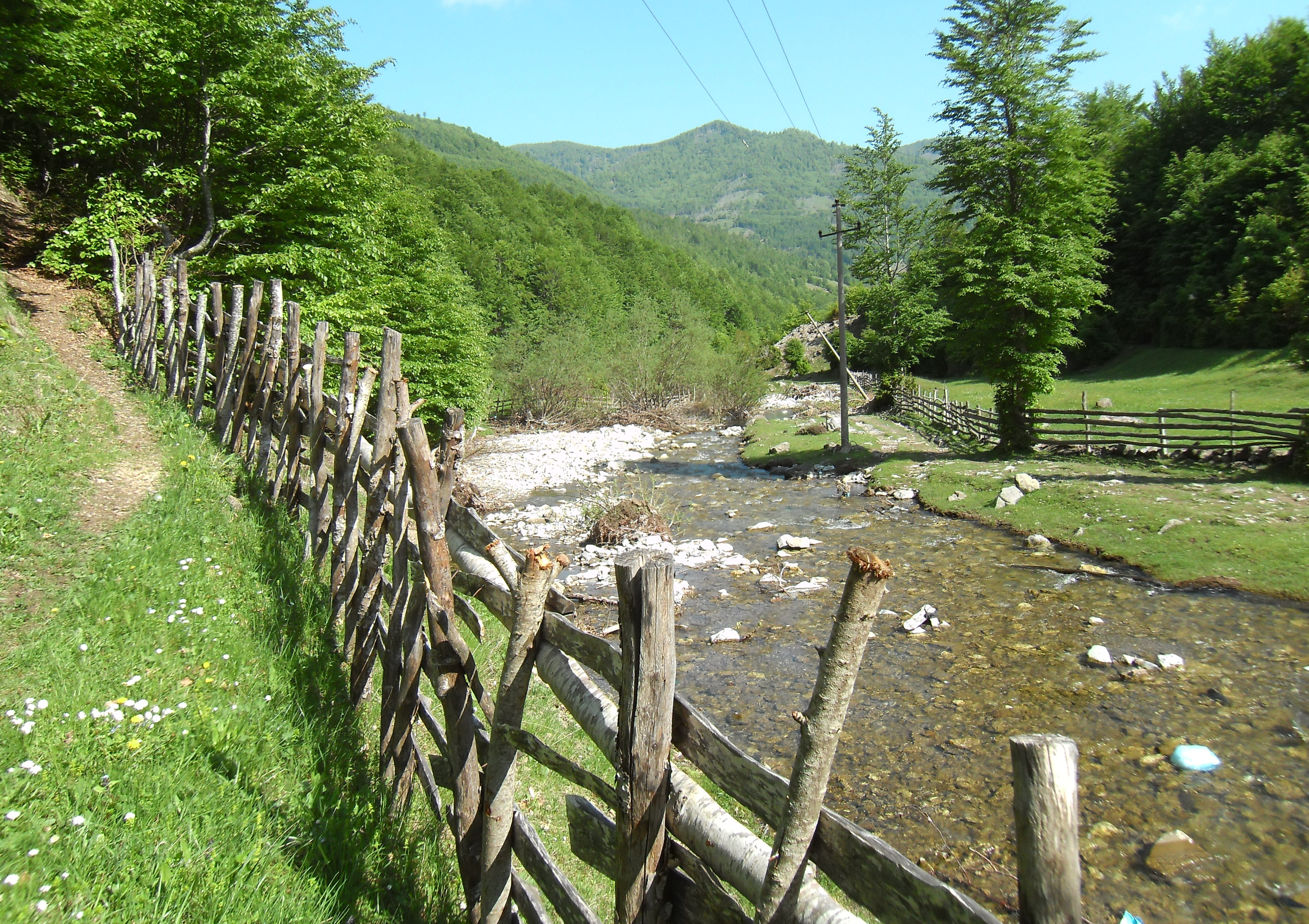
Landscape in Lëpushë
