= Kelmend (municipality) =

- Administrative unit
- Location within Albania
- Coordinates: 42°28′N 19°34′E
- Country: Albania
- County: Shkodër
- Municipality: Malësi e Madhe
  - Administrative unit: 384.5 km^{2} (148.5 sq mi)

Population (2011)
  - Administrative unit: 1,464
  - Administrative unit density: 3.808/km^{2} (9.861/sq mi)
- Time zone: UTC+1 (CET)
  - Summer (DST): UTC+2 (CEST)
- Website: www.kelmend.info

Kelmend is a former municipality in the Shkodër County, northwestern Albania. At the 2015 local government reform it became a subdivision of the municipality Malësi e Madhe. The population at the 2023 census was 1,464.

== Settlements ==
The municipal unit is part of the larger Kelmend region, and consists of eight major settlements, along with several other minor settlements.

1. Vermosh
2. Brojë
3. Budaç
4. Gropat e Selcës
5. Javor
6. Kozhnjë
7. Kozhnjë e Sipërme
8. Lëpushë
9. Mreg
10. Nikç
11. Selcë
12. Tamarë
13. Vukël
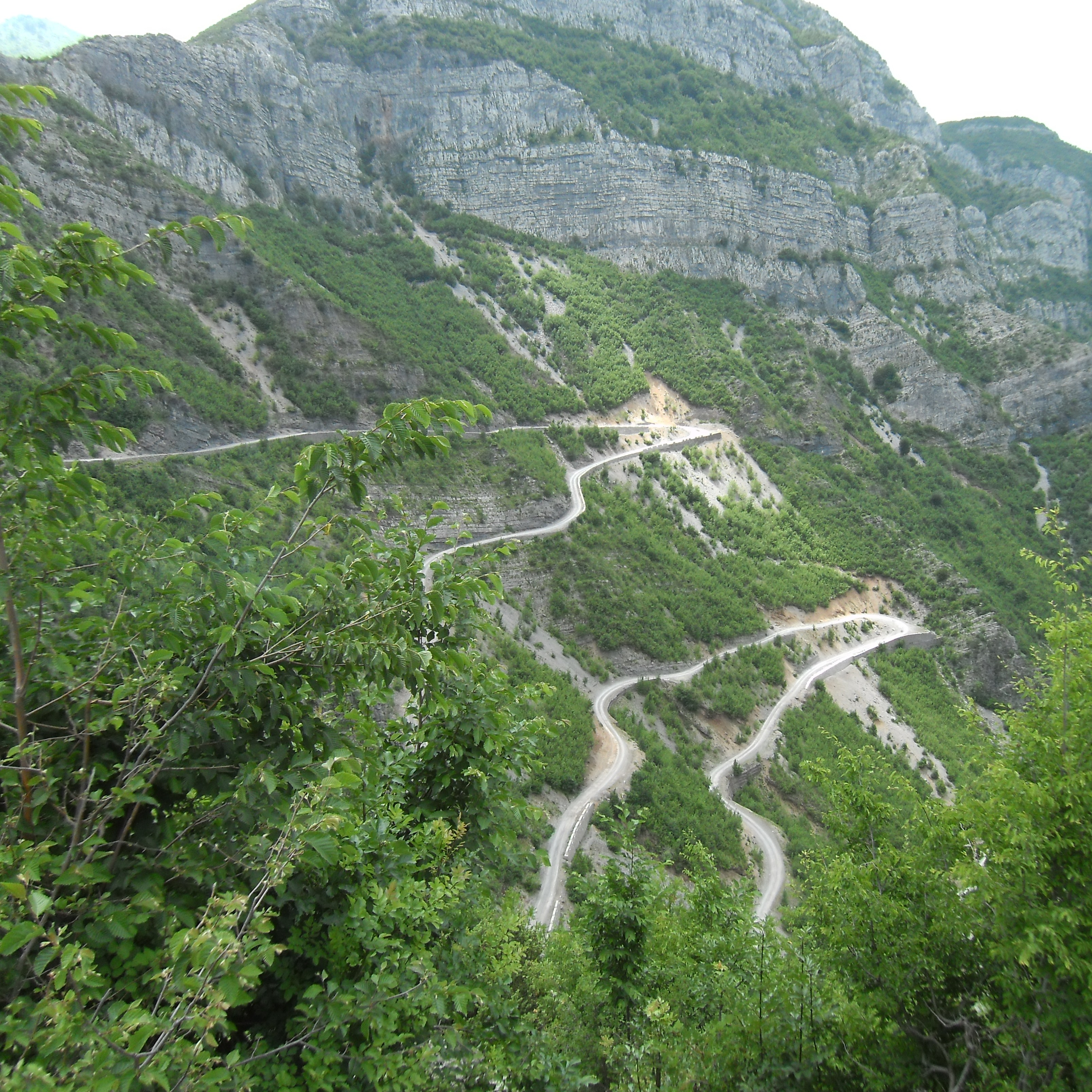

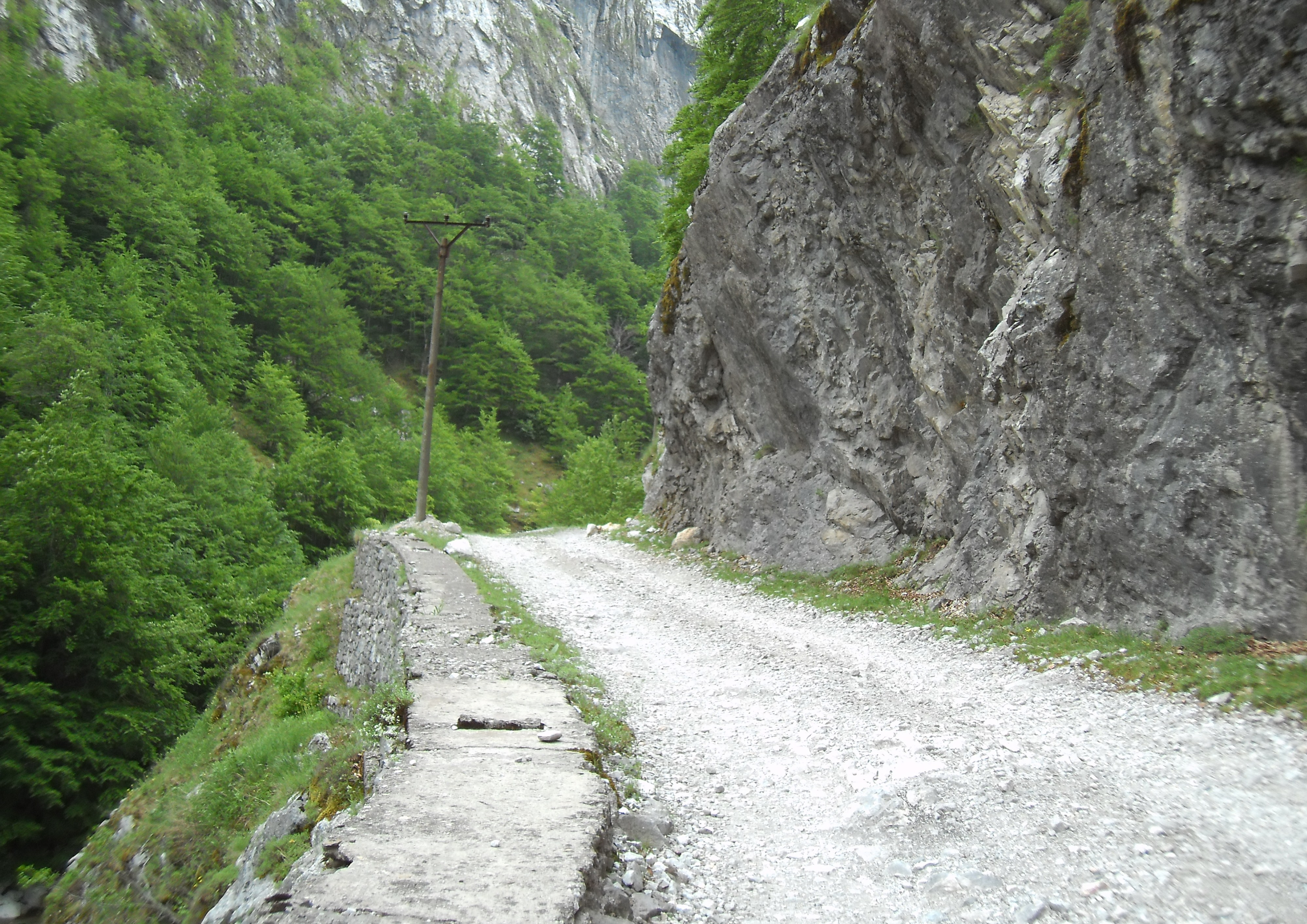

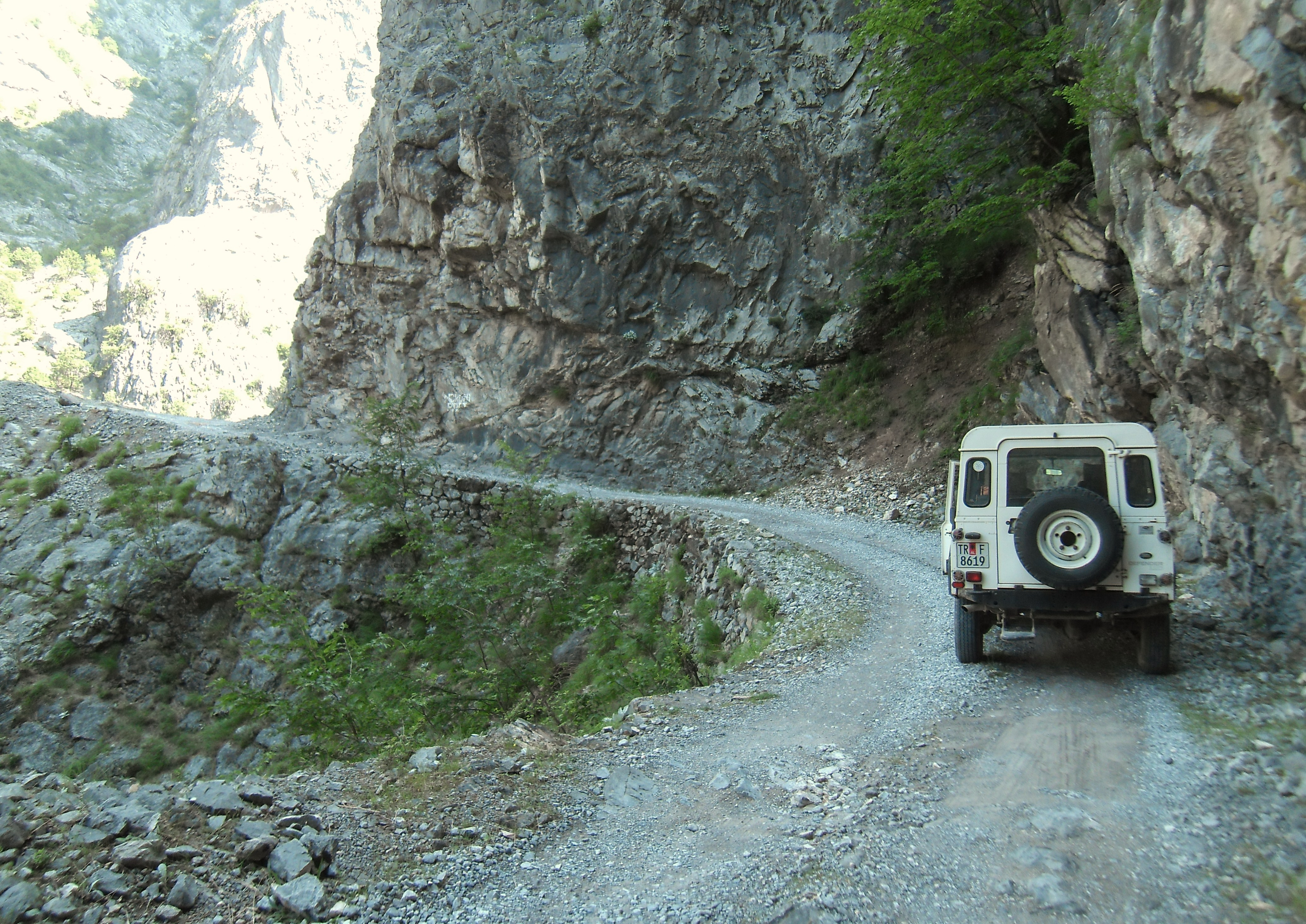

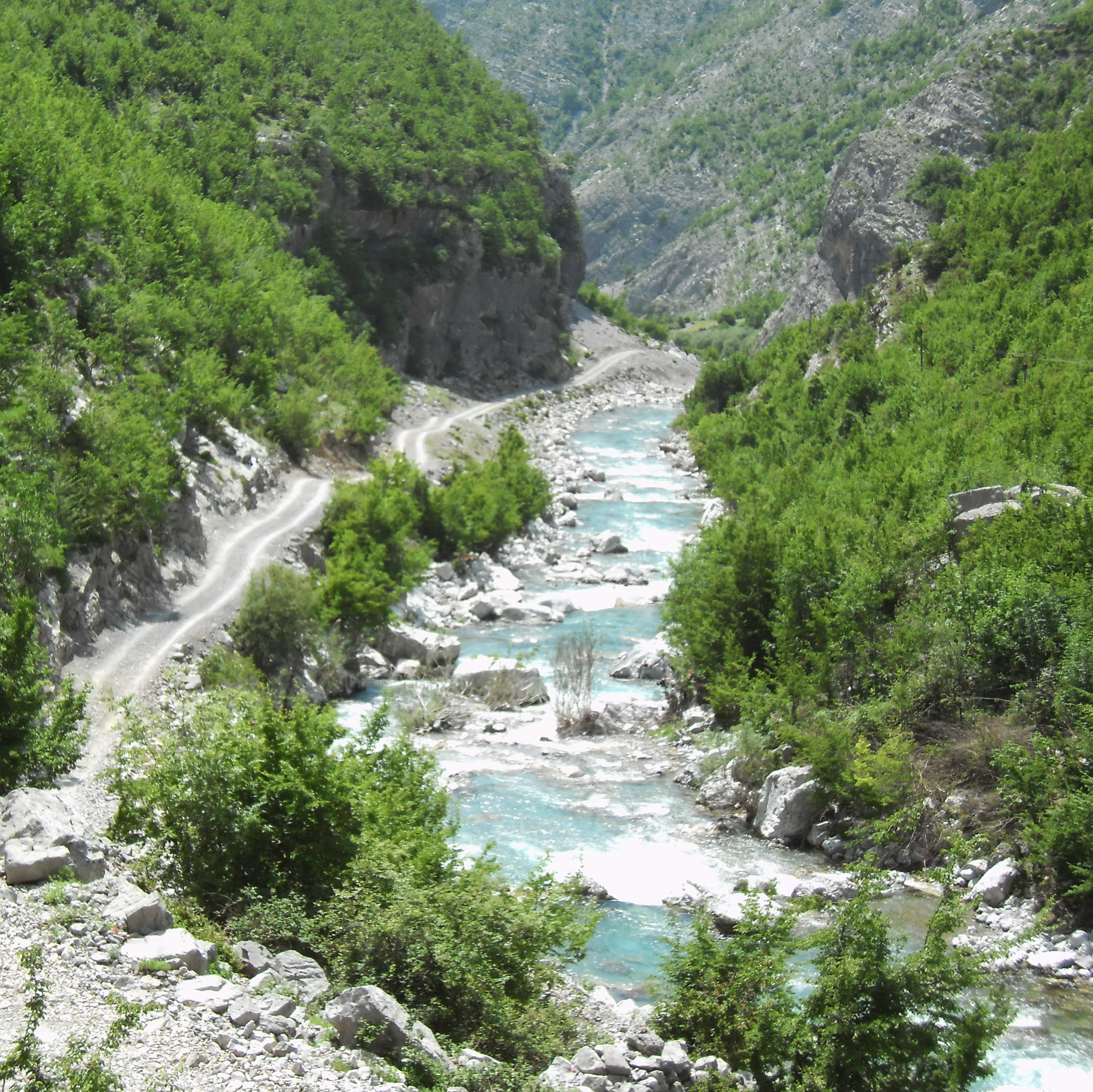
Cem river in Kelmend
