= Plav–Gusinje massacres (1912–1913) =

Massacres in Montenegro

- Part of massacres of Albanians in the Balkan Wars
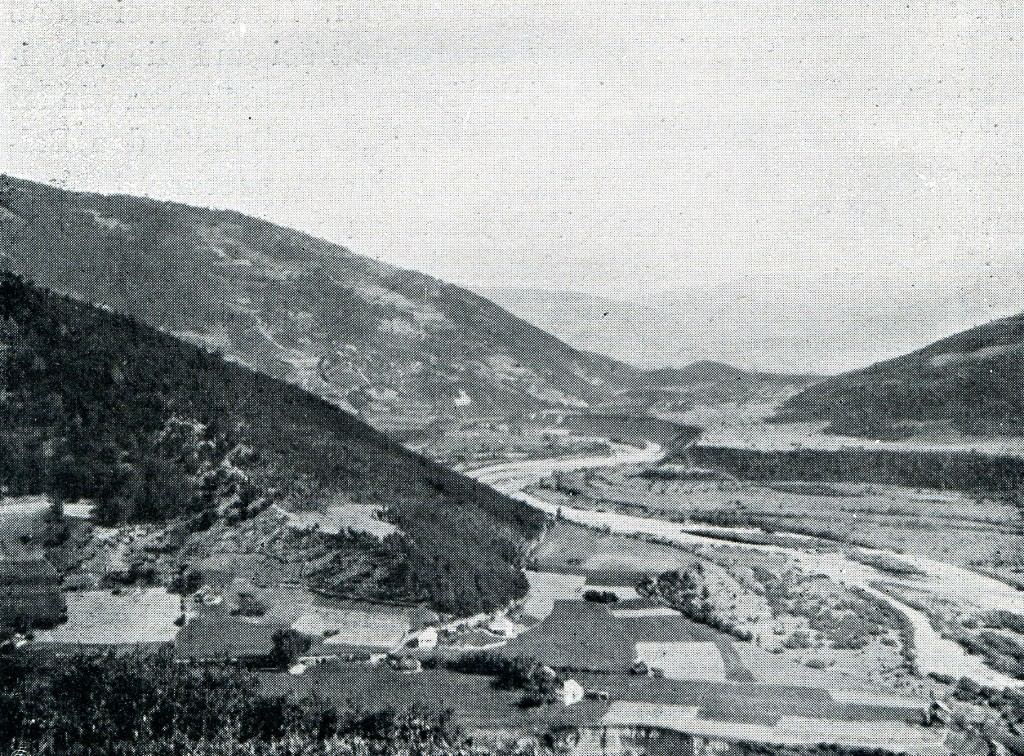
- Plav in 1912
- Location: Plav and Gusinje
- Date: 1912–1913
- Target: Albanians and Bosniaks
- Attack type: Genocidal massacres, ethnic cleansing, forced conversions
- Deaths: up to 1,800–8,000
- Victim: c. 12,000 forcefully converted
- Perpetrator: Kingdom of Montenegro
- Motive: Albanophobia, Anti-Bosniak sentiment, and Islamophobia

The Plav–Gusinje massacres of 1912–1913 occurred between late 1912 and March 1913 in the areas of the modern Plav and Gusinje municipalities and adjacent areas. More than 1,800 locals, mostly Muslim Albanians and a significant number of Bosniaks from these two regions were killed and 12,000 were forced to convert to Orthodoxy by the military administration put in charge of these regions by the Kingdom of Montenegro which had annexed them during the First Balkan War.

Much of the military administration of Plav-Gusinje was manned by the captaincy of the Vasojevići tribe. Brigadier Avro Cemović was the chief leader of the perpetrators of the massacres. The events of the massacres and the forced conversions were stopped with the intervention mainly of Austria-Hungary in April 1913 after the killing of Franciscan Albanian monk Luigj Palaj in a similar campaign of forced conversion in western Kosovo. The events caused a wave of refugees towards Albania and the Ottoman Empire (modern Turkey). The descendants of the victims, Albanians and Bosniaks commemorate the events yearly and have erected memorials for their ancestors.

== Background ==
Plav and Gusinje are located in the Accursed Mountains range in the southern Dinaric Alps at an altitude of about 1,000m. They have a large Albanian and Muslim population. The regions were a target for expansion of Montenegro since its formation as the Principality of Montenegro. The area which then was part of the Ottoman Empire was to pass under Montenegro in 1879 but local resistance against the Montenegrin army by the Albanian League of Prizren in the Battle of Novšiće stopped its annexation. The area of the Vasojevići tribe is located to the north in Andrijevica and Berane. In the First Balkan War, the six battalions of Lower Vasojevići which formed a single brigade (Gornjovаsojevićkа brigаdа) with a total force of 3,200 were tasked with capturing the Plav-Gusinje region. It was first under the command of Rаdomir Vešović and in the beginning of the war passed under the command of Avro Cemović, a clan leader (serdar) from Vasojevići who was promoted to brigadier-general by King Nicholas I of Montenegro. The brigade was part of the eastern detachment under general Janko Vukotić. When the war began, the Ottoman army - still in the aftermath of the Albanian revolt of 1912 - had deployed a very light regular force which was defeated and retreated very quickly when the Montenegrin attack began in the early hours between 8 and 9 October 1912. Effective resistance to the Montenegrin army was shown by local, volunteer sharpshooters. The Albanian households of Nokshiq/Novšiće, Arzhanica e Ultë/Lower Ržanica and Pepići/Pepaj, 127 in total, were burnt as the Montenegrin army advanced.

The defense of the region lasted for about 10 days and on 19 October the Montenegrin army entered Plav. A day later, on 20 October they entered Gusinje. One of the first acts of the military was to imprison in Nikšić 323 important local figures of Plav and Gusinje. These included Osman Cekaj, Ismail Nikoçi, Medo Radončić (Radonciqi), Omer and Medo Ferri, members of the Rexhepagaj/Redzepagić, the strongest family of Plav and many others. In early November, the army moved out but one battalion remained to hold control. Vukotić in his correspondence with King Nicholas at that time reported that no new attacks had been carried out against the army and that the locals had begun to return to their homes.

== Early events ==
Civil administration in the region since the beginning of the annexation was organized as a military administration. It was divided into five captaincies: Gusinje, Vojno Selo, Vusanje, Plav and Brezojevica. A gendarmerie was founded for the enforcement of administrative measures and law. Niko Vucelić, a local Orthodox Slav from Brezojevica, a village north of Plav was put in charge of the military administration by Vešović. In December 1912, the five captaincies were united into a single one for the whole region under that of Vasojevići. After the rest of the Eastern Detachment left, under the military administration of the battalion of Vasojevići pillaging and robberies against the local population began. The military administration in some cases openly supported crimes against the locals and created a situation in which crimes against Muslims were not viewed as punishable acts and crimes.

The campaign of forced conversions was put forward by Serb Orthodox Patriarch Gavrilo Dožić. Minister of Church Affairs, Mirko Mijušković made it a law of the Montenegrin state on December 21, 1912. The law directed the Orthodox priesthood to mass convert Muslims and Catholics to Serbian Orthodoxy. The conversion campaign was implemented since January and intensified in March under when Brigadier Avram Cemović became head of the military administration of Plav-Gusinje. On March 23, Cemović in a report noted that until then about 3,000 Muslims had been converted. The total number of the forced conversions by the end of the campaign may have reached more than 10,000 people without including figures from villages north of Plav and those of refugees. Mulla Šaban Musić (Shaban Musiqi/Musaj) in order to help the locals to convert without renouncing their true beliefs, issued a fatwa which absolved those who converted from any sins.

Avro Cemović established the extraordinary military court of the region under Vukota Pantović. The order for its establishment was given by the Minister of War of Montenegro, Dušan Vuković. Its three members were Montenegrin military commanders, Vuksan Dragović and Milan Vešović, and Hajro Basić/Bashiqi who was a local Muslim hodja. Basić collaborated with Cemović and converted to Orthodoxy for a payment of 100 perpers and various privileges. He took the name Balša Balšić and was promoted to the rank of major in the Montenegrin army. One of this first actions in the court was to condemn to death some of his cousins who refused to convert.

== Massacres ==
The killings by the Montenegrin army in Plav-Gusinje had begun after the army entered in the region in late October. Ramë Isuf Kukaj was one of the first to be executed. He is considered to be the first person from Gusinje who was executed. A monument was erected in his memory in 2012. The massacres intensified in March with the establishment of the military court. The pass of Previ (Qafa e Previsë/Previja) near Andrijevica was a main location in which executions took place. The total number of Albanians executed in Previ reached up to 700, many from the villages of Vuthaj and Martinaj. The first death sentence by the extraordinary military court was carried out on March 5 in Racina, Plav. It involved some of the most prominent citizens of the town of Plav.

On that same day, 108 forced conversions were also carried out in Plav - 94 Muslims and 14 Catholics were forced to become Orthodox. The chief executioner was Vukota Pantović, the commander of the battalion which was stationed in Plav. Two of them belonged to the Omeragaj/Omeragić brotherhood of Gusinje, while three of those executed on March 5 were members of the Ferri family - Shaqo Ferri and Jakup Ferri's sons, Agan and Emin.

Mass executions in Gusinje began on 9 March. 28 people were executed according to the official records, but testimonies from locals indicate that those executed were more than 28. On that same day, 29 people were sentenced to death in Plav. Trials which ended in mass death sentences occurred every day in Plav-Gusinje throughout March and early April. forced by international pressure to stop the campaign The event which caused international uproar against the Montenegrin campaign was the murder of Franciscan Albanian monk Luigj Palaj (alternatively, Luigi Palić) in a similar campaign of the Montenegrin state in the parts of western Kosovo it had acquired in the First Balkan War. This event proved to be pivotal in triggering international response. He was arrested by the Montenegrin army and executed in Gjakova. Austria-Hungary launched a strong protest and called for freedom of religion to be respected for all. The Montenegrin government replied that he was executed according to the Montenegrin military code after being arrested for rebellion along with about 55 other people. Austria-Hungary increased pressure and with British compliance, Nicholas I was forced to close the military courts in the region and recall Cemović.

There is variation in the estimates about the total number of those killed in the massacres and those who underwent forced reconversion. Most of those who were killed were Albanians and most were Muslims, although some of those forced to convert were Catholics too. Today, the descendants of the victims include Albanians and Bosniaks. A contemporary report by Djordje Šekularac, head Orthodox priest of the military administration noted 12,000 conversions. The total number of those forced to convert reached 12,000 and 800 who refused to do so were executed in the town of Plav and Gusinje by February 1913. In Plav, a total of about 500 who refused to convert were executed. Modern Bosniak organizations maintain that more than 1,800 were killed in the course of the massacres and 12,000 were forced to convert. Mark Krasniqi of the Academy of Sciences of Kosovo has placed the total number of Albanians killed during the massacres at 8,000.

== Aftermath ==
The international uproar against the events in Plav-Gusinje forced the Montenegrin government to open an investigation about them. The commission which investigated crimes in Plav, Gusinje and parts of the Sandzak was headed by Mato Katurić and Andrija Rađenović. In June 1913, the commission published its report which concluded that Muslims in the region were violently converted. Some top-level officers - including Hajro Basić - were indicted with the exception of Avro Cemović. Those convicted only remained in prison for a very brief period. Avro Cemović was removed from his position on April and replaced by brigadier Mašan Božović.

Božović in his report to general Janko Vukotić noted that the people of Plav and Gusinje only converted under the threat of a violent campaign of executions and harassment. The stance of Austria-Hungary forced the Montenegrin king to proclaim freedom of religion for all subjects in Plav-Gusinje. After freedom of religion was proclaimed again on May 5, all the newly converted returned to their previous religion. Estimates of those who remained Orthodox vary from one person to two or three families in Plav. Many people fled from the area before, during and in the aftermath of the events. Those who returned in the area often found their property to have been confiscated and resettled by Montenegrin colonists. William Warfield, director of the Red Cross Unit in Albania in the Balkan Wars reported about 2,000 Albanian refugees from Gusinje and Plav in Shkodra. 128 families from Plav-Gusinje fled to Turkey. Many of these families settled in İzmir and Adapazarı.

== In historiography ==
In Montenegrin historiography, the events of the Plav-Gusinje massacres generally have been omitted. In particular, in monographs about the participation of Vasojevići in the Balkan Wars the role of the tribe in the Plav-Gusinje events has never been discussed.

== Commemoration ==
In the 100th anniversary of the events in March 2013, Albanians and Bosniaks prayed together in Plav to mark it as a day of remembrance. The descendants of the victims in the two municipalities have described the events as genocide. 2013 was also the year in which the then President of Montenegro Filip Vujanović made one of the first direct acknowledgments of the events by a Montenegrin politician during a ceremony in Berane when he declared that "the crimes performed in Plav and Gusinje are the dark side of the Montenegrin history".

== Sources ==
=== Bibliography ===
- Dedushaj, Rexhep (1993). Krahina e Plavë-Gucisë nëpër shekuj [The region of Plav-Gusinje throughout the centuries]. New York. OCLC 43026372.
- Elsie, Robert; Destani, Bejtullah D. (2018). Kosovo, A Documentary History: From the Balkan Wars to World War II. Bloomsbury Publishing. p. 165. ISBN 978-1-78673-354-2.
- Krasniqi, Kolë (2019). Islamist Extremism in Kosovo and the Countries of the Region. Springer Nature. ISBN 978-3030185695.
- Krasniqi, Mark (1993). "The role of the Serbian Orthodox Church in anti-Albanian policies in Kosova". The Kosova Issue--a Historic and Current Problem: Symposium Held in Tirana on April 15–16, 1993.
- Galaty, Michael; Lafe, Ols; Lee, Wayne; Tafilica, Zamir (2013). Light and Shadow: Isolation and Interaction in the Shala Valley of Northern Albania. The Cotsen Institute of Archaeology Press. ISBN 978-1931745710.
- Milosević, Milena (6 March 2013). "Montenegro's Muslims Stage Mass Prayer to Mark 'Genocide'". Balkan Insight. Balkan Insight.
- Müller, Dietmar (2005). Staatsbürger aus Widerruf: Juden und Muslime als Alteritätspartner im rumänischen und serbischen Nationscode : ethnonationale Staatsbürgerschaftskonzepte 1878-1941. Otto Harrassowitz Verlag. ISBN 3447052481.
- Pacariz, Sabina (2014). Yearbook of Muslims in Europe. BRILL. p. 437. ISBN 9789004283053.
- Premović, Marijan (2013). "VАSOJEVIĆI PREMА PLАVU I GUSINJU [Vasojevići against Plav and Gusinje]". Almanah. 54–56. OCLC 1088898622.
- Poláčková, Zuzana; Van Duin, Peter (2013). "Montenegro Old and New: History, Politics, Culture, and the People" (PDF). Studia Politica Slovaca. VI (1).
- Rastoder, Šerbo (2017). "Pismo gusinjskog kadije Šabana (Musića) – Murtezi Karađuzoviću, muftiji crnogorskih muslimana, povodom masovnog pokrštavanja 1913. godine". Almanah. 75–76.
- Šarkinović, Hamdija (2013). "ORGANIZACIJA I FUNKCIONISANJE VLASTI U CRNOJ GORI (1912–1914) [ORGANIZATION AND GOVERNMENT FUNCTION OF MONTENEGRO (1912-1914)]" (PDF). Almanah. 55–56.
- Zejnullahu, Adem (2006). "KËNGËT POPULLORE PËR KONVERTIMIN E DHUNSHËM TË SHQIPTARËVE NË FENË ORTODOKSE NGA FQINJËT SLLAVË [Folk songs about the violent conversion of Albanians to Christian Orthodoxy by their Slavic neighbours]". Gjurmime Albanologjike. 36.
