= Branka Đukić =

Serb girl killed by Albanians

- Бранка Ђукић
- Born: 4 September 1956; Meteh, SR Montenegro, FNR Yugoslavia
- Died: 2 September 1975 (aged 18); Čakor, SR Serbia, SFR Yugoslavia
- Citizenship: Yugoslav
- Known for: A girl who was killed and her father took revenge

Branka Đukić (Serbian Cyrillic: Бранка Ђукић; 4 September 1956 – 2 September 1975) was an eighteen-year-old Serb girl who was shot dead by two local Albanians after they had tried to rape her. The case attracted public attention and caused great controversy in the Yugoslav society. At the end of alleged perpetrators' trial, Branka's father, Rade Đukić, shot one of the two defendants to death.

== Biography ==
Branka Đukić was born in 1956 in the village of Meteh, in the municipality of Plav. She completed primary school in Meteh, and completed three years of high school in Plav. After her third year (after she had allegedly been sexually harassed by a professor at school), she decided to transfer to a gymnasium in the city of Peć.

In the morning of 2 September 1975, she left home to enroll at the Peć Gymnasium. On her way back, she took the bus to the terminal at the top of Mount Čakor and proceeded to walk home over the mountain. There, she was ambushed by two Albanians who attempted to rape her at gunpoint. Đukić resisted, slapped one of men and spat at them. As she tried to run away, one of two perpetrators shot at her, hitting the back of her head and killing her instantly. Her body was later discovered by her father, Rade Đukić.

== Trial ==
A brief and efficient police investigation determined that the crime had been committed by two Albanian youths, Rustem Hasanmetaj and Gani Kurmehaj, from the village of Gornji Streoc, near Peć.

Their trial took place at the District Court in Bijelo Polje. The court found the primary (Hasanmetaj) perpetrator guilty, sentencing him to 15 years in prison, while his accomplice (Kurmehaj) received a 13.5-year sentence. On 4 December 1975, the last day of the trial, Branka's father, Rade Đukić, who had been allowed to be present in the courtroom throughout the trial as well as during the sentencing, pulled out a revolver and shot Hasanmetaj to death

The case garnered significant public and media attention and a petition calling for the release of Rade Đukić collected 75,000 signatures.

Rade Đukić was later sentenced to eight years in prison for his retaliatory act. At his trial, he was represented pro bono by lawyer Veljko Guberina. Subsequently, the Supreme Court of Montenegro reduced his sentence to five years. Since he had already served four years of his sentence at that point, the authorities decided to release him.

== See also ==
- Đorđe Martinović
