= Çelë Shabani =

Çelë Shabani (c. 1830-1879) was an Albanian commander of the Albanian forces of the League of Prizren in 1879. Born and raised in Rugova, Shabani fought along Jakup Ferri in the Battle of Novšiće against the Montenegrin annexation of Plav-Gusinje area in 1879. He was a Malësor. As a young boy, he lived in Niksic and fought a Montenegrin named Uros. He came out as victorious and, as were the customs of the time, Shabani cut the head of the soldier and carried it with him. At the age of 22, Shabani was given a medal for his heroic acts. Shabani fought all his life against the Montenegrin forces of Marko Miljanov and died in Novšiće in 1879.
