= Radovan Zogović =

Montenegrin poet (1907–1986)

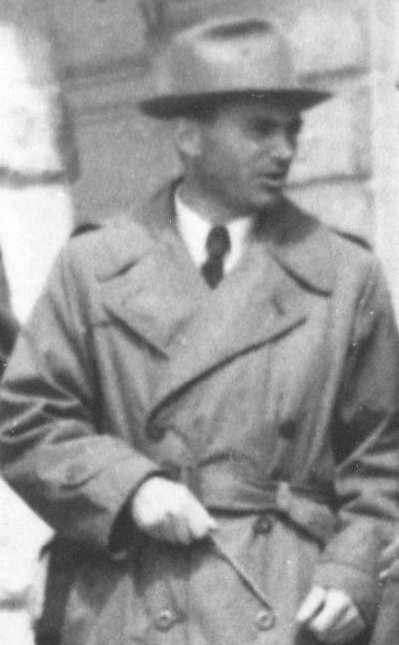
- Zogović in April 1945
- Born: 18 August 1907; Mašnica, Plav, Ottoman Empire
- Died: 5 January 1986 (aged 78); Belgrade, SFR Yugoslavia
- Occupation: Poet

Radovan Zogović (Serbian Cyrillic: Радован Зоговић; 18 August 1907 – 5 January 1986) was a Montenegrin poet.

== Biography ==
He was born in Mašnica, Plav, in northeastern Montenegro (then a part of Ottoman Empire) on 19 August 1907. Before World War II he lived in Skopje, Zagreb and Belgrade, working as a literary critic and a secondary school teacher, and joined the Communist Party of Yugoslavia. His first book of poetry, Glineni golubovi (Clay Pigeons, 1937), was banned by the Yugoslav royal regime.

He joined the Partisans in 1941, and after World War II he was briefly one of the most prominent figures in Yugoslav government, as head of the propaganda of the Communist Party of Yugoslavia, authoring several programmatic and polemical articles and criticism from the standpoint of dogmatic real socialism (Na poprištu, "At the scene", 1948). He was expelled from the League of Communists and put under house arrest in 1948 in connection with the Tito-Stalin split. He was accused of being Stalinist and for Montenegrin nationalism among else.

In the late 1960s Zogović was semi-rehabilitated, and in that period his best works were published: poetry collections Prkosne strofe ("Defiant verses", 1947), Žilama za kamen ("Veins for the rock"), Artikulisana riječ ("Articulated word", 1965), Lično, sasvim lično ("Personal, very personal"), Noć i pola vijeka ("A night and half a century", 1978) and Knjaževska kancelarija (The Prince's Office). He also wrote the novel Pejsaži i nešto se dešava ("The landscape and something happens", 1968). His poetry at first was very socially engaged, critical and polemical towards social reality, while in the later songs predominate landscape and homeland motifs and reflection on youth, the passage of time and fate. His poems have been translated in many languages, and he himself translated works from Russian, Bulgarian, Turkish and Macedonian authors, including Vladimir Mayakovsky, Anna Akhmatova and Nazim Hikmet.

Among his close friends were the Serbian poet Desanka Maksimović and the Montenegrin novelist Mihailo Lalić. He was a member of the Montenegrin Academy of Sciences and Arts.

He died of cancer on 5 January 1986 in Belgrade.

His wife Vera (who died in 2003) was also a translator from Russian, and his daughter Mirka from Italian.
