= Plav Municipality =

Municipality in Montenegro, Home to Redzepagić Tower

Plav Municipality Opština Plav Општина Плав Komuna e Plavës
- Municipality
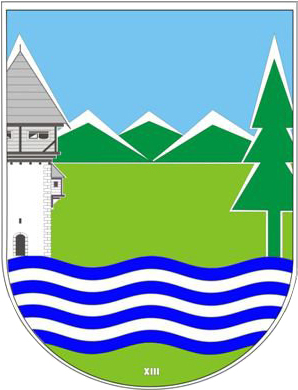
- Coat of arms

- Plav Municipality in Montenegro
- Country: Montenegro
- Capital: Plav

Area
  - Total: 379 km^{2} (146 sq mi)

Population (2011)
  - Total: 9,081
  - Density: 24.0/km^{2} (62.1/sq mi)
- Time zone: UTC+1 (CET)
  - Summer (DST): UTC+2 (CEST)
- Postal code: 84323–84326
- Area code: +382 51
- ISO 3166 code: ME-13
- Vehicle registration: PL
- Website: www.plav.me

Plav Municipality (Montenegrin: Opština Plav / Општина Плав, Albanian: Komuna e Plavës) is one of the municipalities of Montenegro. It is located in Northern Montenegro. The center is the town of Plav. In February 2014, the southwestern third of the municipality seceded to form the Gusinje Municipality.

== Geography ==
Plav is located at the foot of the Accursed Mountains, adjacent to the springs of the river Lim. The area contains many lakes and the most known is Lake Plav, one of the largest in the region. The lakes Hrid and Visitor are mountain lakes, and Visitor is noted for its floating island. Plav is also renowned for its karst wells, among which are the Ali Pasha of Gucia Springs and Oko Skakavica.

== Settlements ==
The Plav Municipality is divided into 5 communes (mjesna zajednica) with 22 settlements (naselje). The communes of the Plav Municipality: Brezojevica (Brezojevica), Plav (Plav, Babino Polje, Bogajići, Budojevice, Jara, Jasenica, Komorača, Korita, Meteh, Đurička Rijeka, Hakanje (Hakaj), Hoti, Skić and Vojno Selo), Murino (Murino, Gornja Rženica, Mašnica and Pepići), Prnjavor (Prnjavor), Velika: Velika and Novšiće).

=== City Assembly (2022–2026) ===
Party/Coalition	Seats	Local government
SD	8 / 31	Government
BS	7 / 31	Opposition
DPS	5 / 31	Government
ZBCG (NSD–DNP)	4 / 31	Opposition
SDP	3 / 31	Government
URA	2 / 31	Opposition
AA	1 / 31	Opposition
SNP	1 / 31	Opposition

== Demographics ==
The town of Plav is the administrative centre of the Plav Municipality, which in 2011 had a population of 9,081. The town of Plav itself has 3,717 residents. The town of Plav is the administrative centre of the Plav Municipality, which in 2023 had a population of 9,050. The town of Plav itself has 4,121 residents.

Population history:

- 1948 - 15,764
- 1953 - 17,330
- 1961 - 18,913
- 1971 - 19,542
- 1981 - 19,560
- 1991 - 19,305
- 2003 - 13,805
- 2011 - 13,108
- 2023 - 9,050 (without Gusinje Municipality)

Ethnic composition (2011)
Bosniaks	51.90%
Albanians	18.88%
Serbs	16.01%
Montenegrins	6.27%
Muslims	5.55%
Others	1.70%

Ethnic composition (2023)
Bosniaks	65.64%
Albanians	9.43%
Serbs	17.08%
Montenegrins	4.11%
Muslims	2.61%
Others	1.13%

Religion (2023 census)
Islam	79.16%
Eastern Orthodox	19.89%
Roman Catholic	0.19%
Others	0.32%
Undeclared	0.44%

Languages (2023 census)
Montenegrin	9.61%
Serbian	18.90%
Bosnian	60.53%
Albanian	8.38%
Undeclared	0.34%
Others	2.24%

== Gallery ==
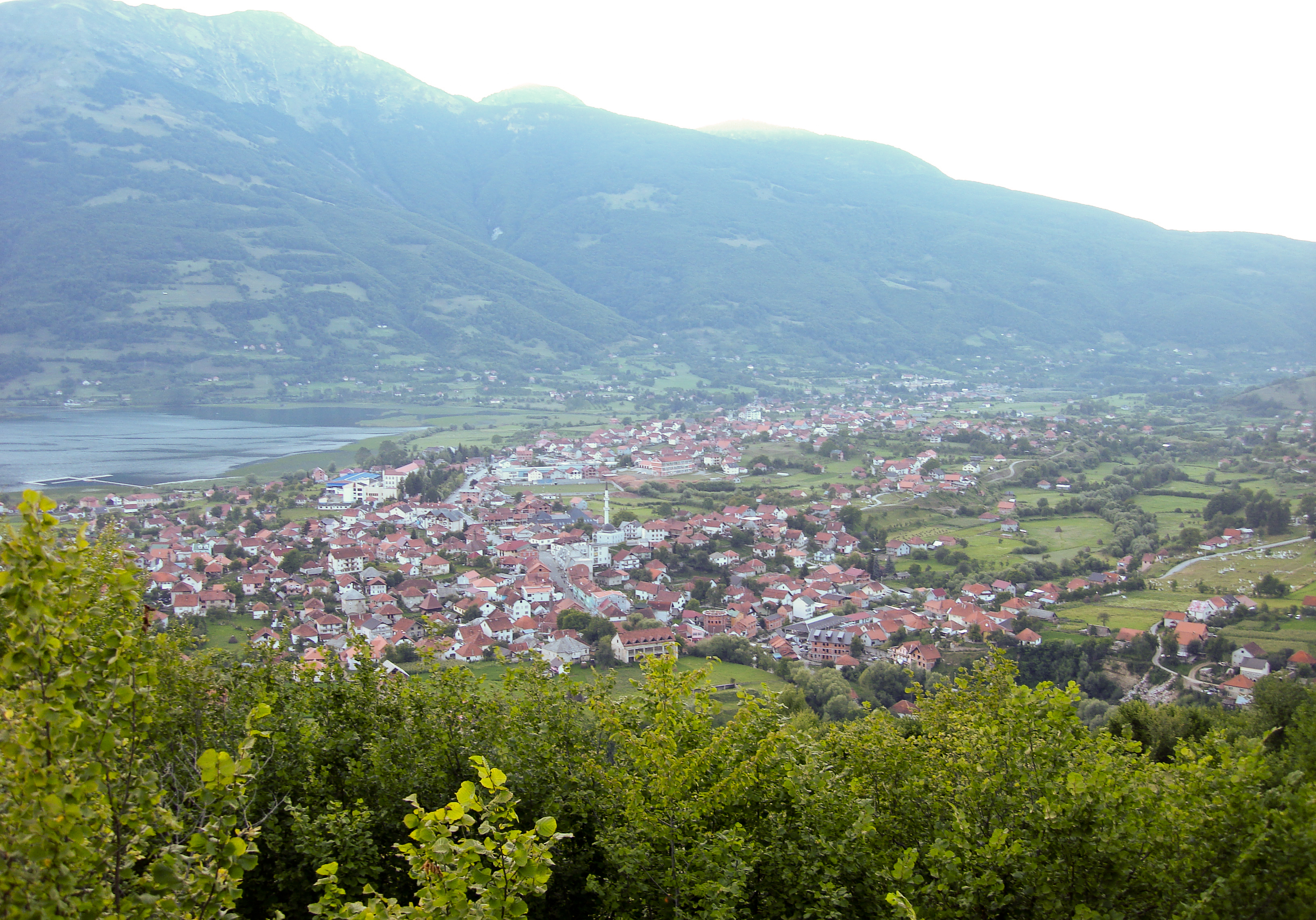
Town of Plav

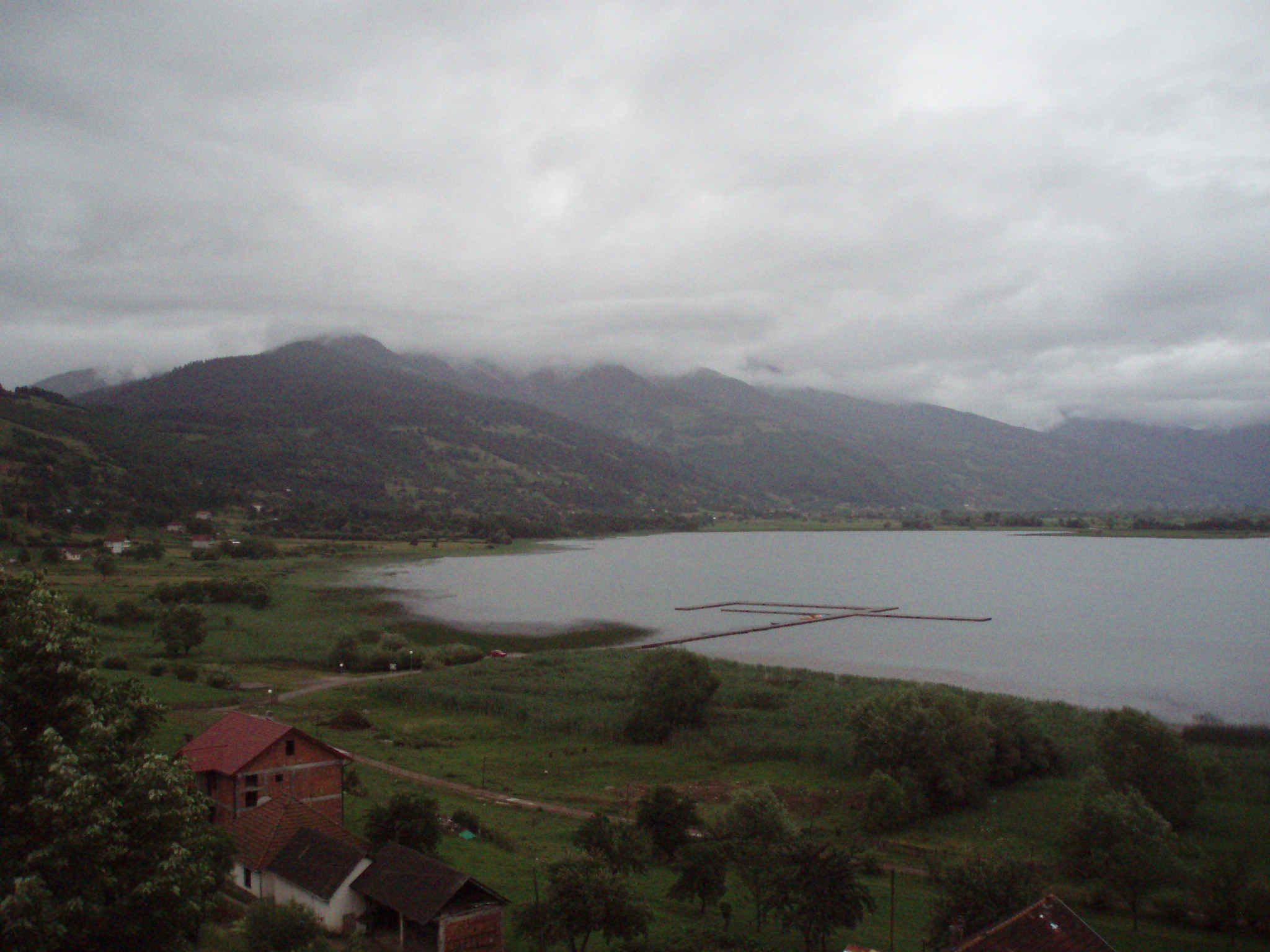
Lake Plav

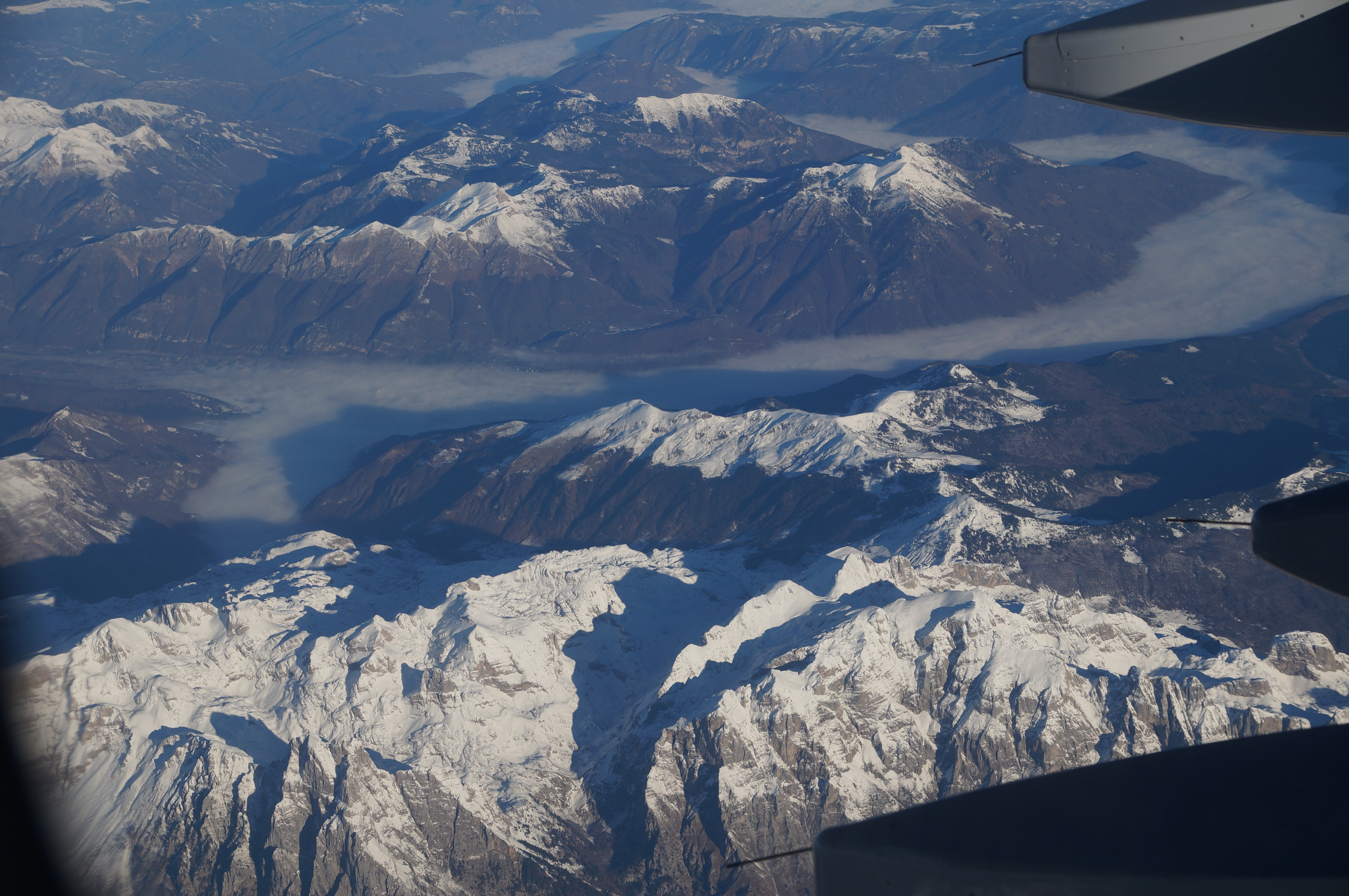
Prokletije massif

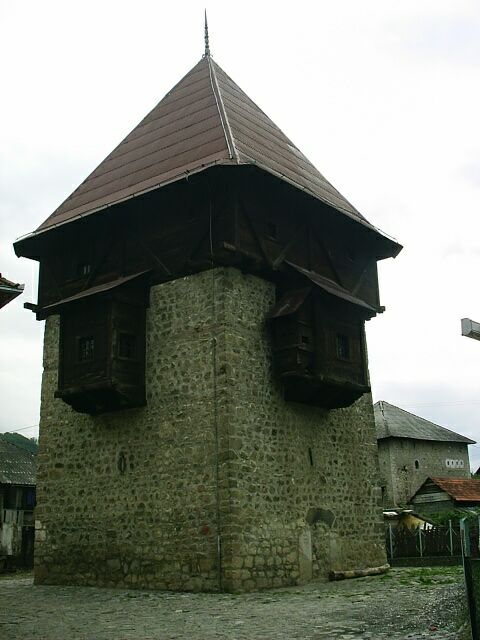
Old Town of Plav
