= Severed leg killer =

Unidentified Turkish serial killer

Details
- Victims: 8
- Span of crimes: 2000–2001
- Country: Turkey
- Location: Istanbul
- Date apprehended: Never apprehended

The severed leg killer is the moniker of an unidentified serial killer who murdered eight people in Turkey. Between 2000 and 2001, severed legs belonging to six females and two males were found in various districts of Istanbul. Only one of the victims has been identified, and the statute of limitations on the case expired in 2021.

== Murders ==
On the morning of January 8, 2000, a man collecting papers from a trash can in the Spice Bazaar marketplace of Istanbul's Eminönü district noticed bloodstains on some of the papers. After a more thorough search of the trashcan, the man found a severed human leg. Immediately after, he alerted officers on patrol from the Yeşildirek Police Station. A forensic examination determined that the leg belonged to a 26-27-year-old woman, and that the leg had been severed one to three days before its discovery. Authorities noted that the leg was well-groomed, as it had no hair and the nails were pedicured.

At 6:00 a.m. on May 19, 2000, a captain of a boat docked at Istanbul's Eminönü port heard something repeatably bumping into the bow of his boat. When the captain investigated the noise, he discovered a severed leg. He initially mistook it for a mannequin leg, but soon realized that the leg was from a human. One of the passengers of the boat found another leg on the nearby shore. Forensic experts determined that the legs belonged to a 25 to 30-year-old woman. Although, the prolonged exposure to salt water degraded the legs, which made it more difficult to figure out when the legs were severed, experts estimated that they were severed seven to 10 days before they were found. The toes of both legs had dark red nail polish. In an attempt to identify the remains, police looked through reports of disappearances. Through this, they discovered a possible match, a prostitute who operated in Aksaray and Taksim. Because the missing woman's family could not be contacted, tests were not conducted to confirm if the severed legs belonged to her.

On December 7, 2000, another severed leg was found by a group of high school students. The leg, which belonged to a woman aged 22 to 24, was well-groomed like the previous victims. It was severed a few days prior to its discovery.

On March 12, 2001, two more severed legs were found 50 meters apart in the Haydar district near Unkapanı. The legs, which had been found in garbage bags, belonged to two people, a woman between the ages of 20 and 22, and a man aged 25–30. The woman's leg had been severed cleanly like the previous victims, while the cuts to the man's leg were rougher. Blood samples taken from the man's leg showed traces of drugs and alcohol.

On March 22, 2001, the severed leg of the only identified victim, 17-year-old Yasemin Durgun, was found by two garbage collectors in Tünel, an Istanbul-based subway funicular line. Her leg was likely submerged in hot water before it was disposed of, as no blood was found at the scene. Durgun's belongings were found two days later in Gümüşsuyu Park. None of her belongings were missing except for her phone, which was later found in Tahtakale. Durgun was last seen at a post office on March 20 and was reported missing soon after. On March 25, a payphone at Durgun's school rang. When a female student answered the phone, a man on the other end said "Don't look for that girl, you won't find her." A similar call happened two minutes later. The caller's voice was described as sounding either intoxicated or "psychotic".

A leg belonging to a 30 to 35-year-old man was found along the coast of Maltepe on July 20, 2001. Blood samples from the leg indicated that there was a large amount of alcohol in the victim's system. The leg was severed at the knee.

== Investigation ==
=== Psychological profile ===
Richard Walter, an American psychologist, made a psychological profile of the perpetrator. The profile stated the following.

- He wants the legs of his victims to be found so that people would know about him, but he doesn't want the rest of his victims' remains to be found so that they can't be identified. He also left the victims' remains in public spaces to cause panic once they are found. Additionally, he revisits the crime scenes to relive the murders he committed.
- The murders of women are sexually motivated and stem from his incompetence. The men he murders were most likely in a relationship with the female victims. The perpetrator murdered all of his victims in one place and cut their bodies into six pieces. He likely carried the bodies with a suitcase and makes at least two trips with the suitcase.
- The murderer wasn't from Istanbul, but moved there for work. He doesn't own a car and instead walks or uses public transport. He most likely works in an establishment that closes at an early time. The murders were extremely organized, so he likely has a history of violence, and may have been to prison or a mental hospital in the past.
- He originally targeted prostitutes due to their vulnerability, but later targeted random people once his confidence increased as a result of seeing the panic he caused.

== See also ==
- List of serial killers by country
- Crime in Turkey
- Butcher of Mons
