= Muamer Zukorlić =

Serbian politician and Muslim theologian (1970–2021)

- Муамер Зукорлић
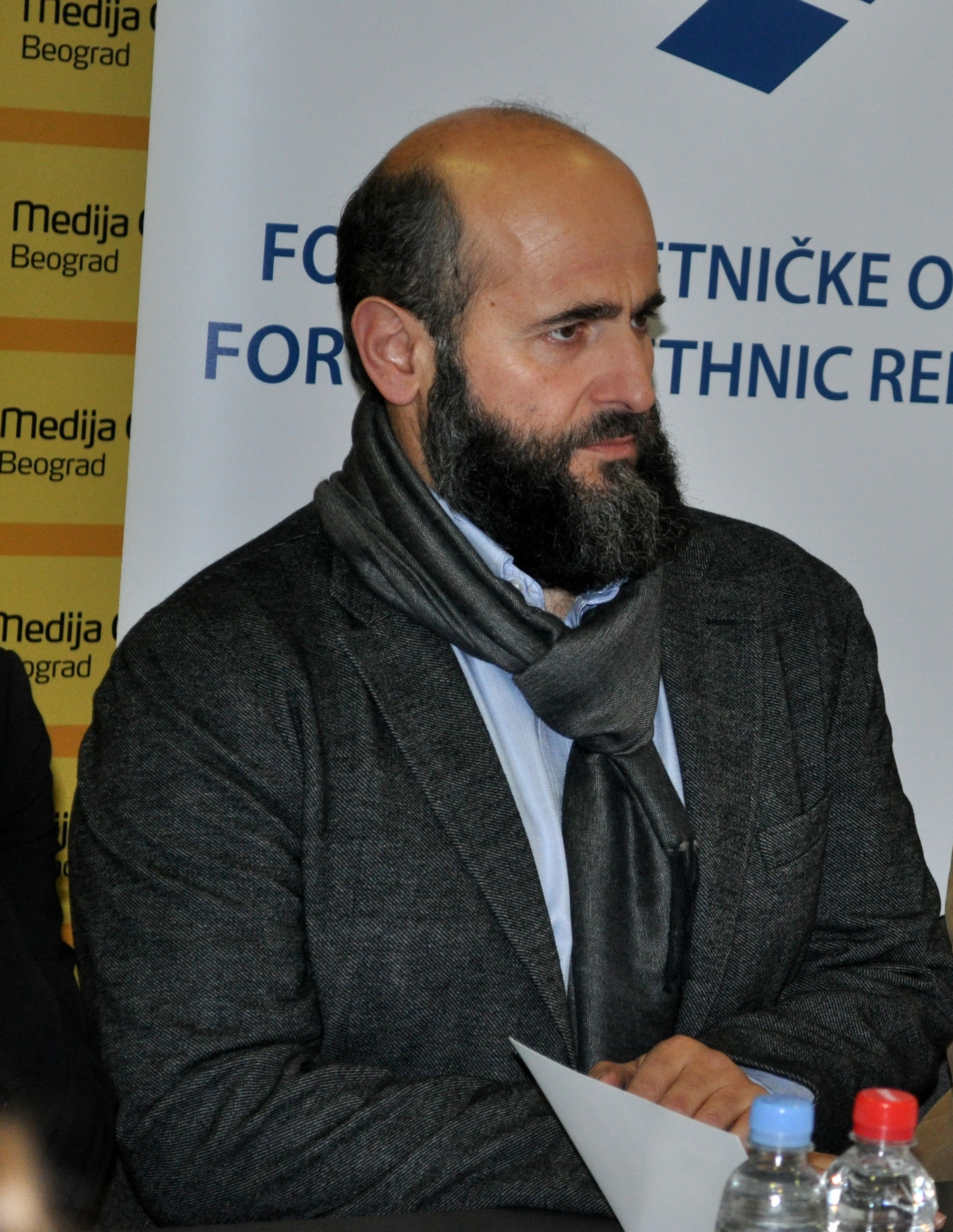
- Zukorlić in 2016

Vice President of the National Assembly of Serbia
- In office 22 October 2020 – 6 November 2021
- President: Ivica Dačić

Member of the National Assembly of Serbia
- In office 3 June 2016 – 22 October 2020
- President: Maja Gojković

Personal details
- Born: 9 October 1969 Tutin, SR Serbia, SFR Yugoslavia
- Died: 6 November 2021 (aged 52) Novi Pazar, Serbia
- Citizenship: Serbia; Bosnia and Herzegovina
- Party: Justice and Reconciliation Party (2013–2021)
- Spouse(s): Umeja Abu Tahe; Elma Elfić
- Children: 8 (including Usame)
- Education: Emir Abdelkader University
- Occupation: Mufti; politician

Muamer Zukorlić (Serbian Cyrillic: Муамер Зукорлић; 9 October 1969 – 6 November 2021) was a Serbian politician and Islamic theologian who served as the president and chief Mufti of the Islamic Community in Serbia. An ethnic Bosniak, he was elected to the National Assembly of Serbia in 2016, later serving as one of its vice presidents from 2020 until his death in 2021.

== Early life ==
Zukorlić was born on 9 October 1969 in Orlje near Tutin, SFR Yugoslavia, where he grew up with his family. He officially used 15 February 1970 as his official birthdate, given that he was officially written down in the birth registry on that date, as it was confirmed by his son, Usame. At that time, in Sandžak, due to high infant mortality, it was a common practice to wait for a few months to see if the child will survive before being registered in the official registry. He attended primary school in the village of Ribariće where he was a straight A student. He subsequently attended the Gazi Husrev Bey's Madrasa in Sarajevo. He studied Islamic sciences firstly at University of Sarajevo where he stayed for less than two weeks when he got the news he was accepted to the Emir Abdelkader University in Constantine, Algeria, where he ended up graduating in 1993. He completed his postgraduate studies in Tripoli, Lebanon.

== Career ==
=== Islamic community ===
After finishing studies in Algeria, Zukorlić became a professor at the Gazi Isa-beg madrasa in Novi Pazar. In October 1993, he was elected as the president of the newly established Islamic Community of Sandžak, a role that he held until early 2016. Zukorlić was later elected in 2007 as the president of the Islamic Community in Serbia and as the chief Mufti. He was also a member of the assembly of the Bosniak National Council and a member of the riyaset of Islamic Community of Bosnia and Herzegovina. He was also a lecturer and dean in the Faculty of Islamic Studies in Novi Pazar. Zukorlić was also the founder and editor-in-chief of the first Islamic newspaper in Sandžak, the Voice of Islam, and was one of the initiators to establish the publishing house "El Kelimeh" in Serbia and Mekteb for preschool and school age children. During his time as chief Mufti, Zukorlić's bodyguards allegedly included people who illegally carried weapons and those who were convicted of attempted murder, but he denied those statements.

=== Politics ===
As a member of the Bosniak National Council, he supported the declaration in which they proclaimed Bosniaks as one of the constituent people in Serbia. After being elected, he said that "the territory of Sandžak will be free and will never be enslaved".

Zukorlić participated in the 2012 presidential election as a candidate representing a civic group. He received support from the Bosniak Democratic Union of Sandžak, which he joined a year later. He campaigned on women's rights issues and reconciliation between Muslim ethnic groups in Serbia and Non-Muslim Serbs, he called to end discrimination against minorities, and compared himself to Barack Obama during election campaigning. Zukorlić placed eleventh in the first round, winning 54,492 votes in total. Shortly after the results were published, Zukorlić claimed electoral fraud.

In 2013, Zukorlić commented that Milo Đukanović promised autonomy for Bosniaks within Montenegro, but that he went on to break their deal and that therefore his "conscience is not clear".

Zukorlić stepped down from his position of chief Mufti in 2016 in order to run in the 2016 parliamentary election. He was chosen as the ballot carrier, and campaigned on reconciliation and his accomplishments as a chief Mufti. The list that he represented won 32,526 votes and managed to win two seats in the National Assembly. Election results also showed that Zukorlić's popularity grew in Sandžak. He supported Aleksandar Vučić in the 2017 presidential election.

Zukorlić held the seat until October 2020, when he was chosen to be one of the vice presidents of the National Assembly. Although he did not attend 695 voting sessions in the National Assembly, he voted 100% in line with the SNS-led government. He held the role of vice president until his death. In 2021, Zukorlić also initially participated in the inter-party dialogue on electoral conditions with delegators from the European Parliament.

== Political views ==
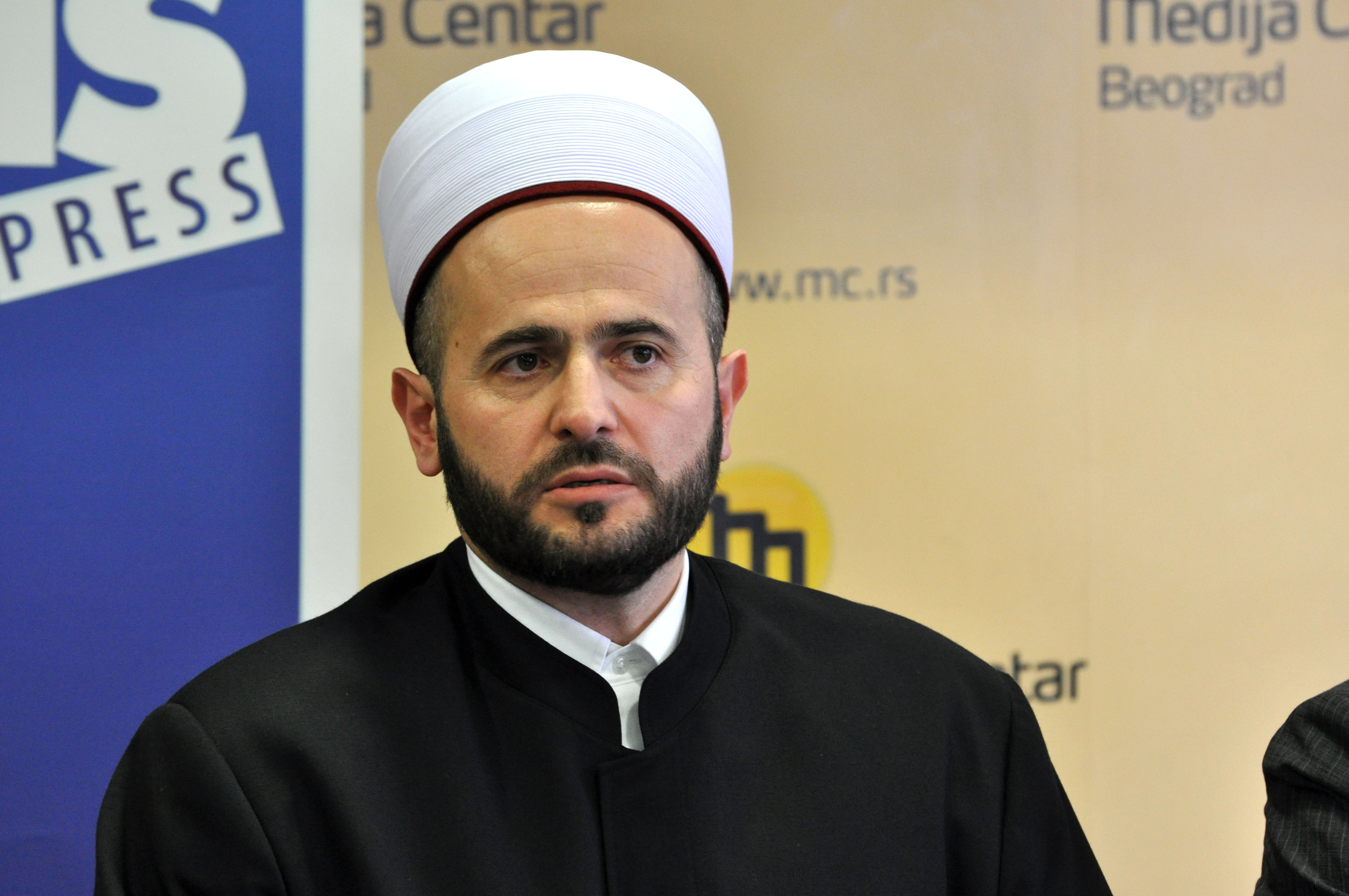
Zukorlić in 2010

Zukorlić supported peaceful relations with other countries in the Balkans, and campaigned during previous elections on a reconciliation program. In order to combat unequal state development, Zukorlić called for decentralization of Serbia. He also called to end organized crime in Serbia. Zukorlić held socially conservative views and he opposed laws on gender equality and protection against discrimination, even though he previously called to end discrimination against minority groups. In 2020, Zukorlić blamed homosexuality and LGBT pride parades for allegedly spreading the virus that causes COVID-19. He opposed radical nationalism and assimilation of ethnic groups. He supported a complete ban on casinos and betting shops.

== Personal life ==
Zukorlić had three wives and eight children. His mother came from the Radončić family which descends from the Albanian tribe of Shkreli. Apart from his native Bosnian, he was fluent in Arabic and spoke conversational-level English. He was a member and one of the founders of the Bosniak Academy of Sciences and Arts, and was an educated Islamic theologian. His family, foundation, and the International University of Novi Pazar, which he helped co-found, was involved in the illegal construction of multiple buildings in Novi Pazar and Tutin. Albeit the investigation found that some of the buildings were built without adequate permits, they were later solemnly registered following municipal decisions and payments of fines.

=== Death ===
Zukorlić died of a heart attack in Novi Pazar on 6 November 2021, at the age of 51. He was scheduled to give a lecture at a university that day, but he fell ill immediately before that. A day of mourning was proclaimed in Novi Pazar and his funeral was held a day later.

On 10 April 2022, Zukorlić's son, Usame, stated at a press conference that his family "has a well-founded suspicion that Muamer Zukorlić was poisoned".
