= Smail Tulja =

Montenegrin killer

- Born: Smajo Džurlić; 1940 or 1941; Plav, Montenegro, Yugoslavia
- Died: 12 February 2012 (aged 70–71); Plav, Montenegro
- Citizenship: Montenegrin
- Spouse: Mary Beal (murdered 1990)
- Conviction: Murder
- Penalty: 12 years (2010)

Details
- Victims: 1–8+
- Span of crimes: 1990–2006
- Country: United States, Belgium, Albania
- State: New York
- Date apprehended: 2007

Smail Tulja (born Smajo Džurlić; 1940 or 1941 – 12 February 2012) was a Montenegrin who was convicted in a Montenegro court, in July 2010, for the 1990 murder of Mary Beal in New York City. Beal went missing on September 15, 1990, and was found three weeks later in two garbage bags. She had been decapitated and dismembered.

Džurlić changed his name to Tulja after fleeing the U.S., with his third wife, following Beal's murder.

Tulja/Džurlić is suspected of being the "Butcher of Mons", in the mid-1990s. He had fled to the Belgian city, still with his third wife, sometime after the murder of Mary Beal. The female victims in Belgium share the similarity of being found dismembered and in garbage bags scattered across the city. Two dismembered female murder victims were found in Albania in 2006. Albanian police asked the American Embassy Regional Security Office for assistance, who coordinated with the FBI resulting in a chain of events that did not solve the Albanian deaths, but did link NYPD to the FBI investigation and Tulja/Džurlić's 2007 arrest in Montenegro by local authorities. That country had just declared independence in 2006, and did not yet have an extradition treaty with the U.S. The Montenegrin court system tried him for Beal's murder in New York City, convicting him in June 2010 and sending him to jail for 12 years a few weeks later.

The FBI/NYPD believe that Tulja/Džurlić may have committed at least eight total murders in Belgium (five), Albania (two) and America (Beal), though Belgian and Albanian police have not made any conclusive connections to those murders.
