= Hoti, Plav =

Hoti Хоти
- Village
- Location within Montenegro
- Coordinates: 42.557853°N 19.9554716°E
- Country: Montenegro
- Municipality: Plav

Population (2011)
  - Total: 205
- Time zone: UTC+1 (CET)
  - Summer (DST): UTC+2 (CEST)

Hoti (Cyrillic: Хоти; Albanian: Hoti i Kujit) is a village in the municipality of Plav, Montenegro.

== History ==
'Hoti i Vendit' or 'Hoti i Kujit' is a settlement of the Hoti tribe.

== Demographics ==
According to the 2011 census, its population was 205. The population is majority Muslim. The Albanians of this village speak with the Gheg dialect of the Albanian language.

Ethnicity in 2011
Ethnicity	Number	Percentage
Albanians	185	90.2%
Bosniaks	11	5.4%
other/undeclared	9	4.4%
Total	205	100%
