= Battle of Novšiće =

1879 battle in Montenegro

- Part of Battles for Plav and Gusinje
Date	4 December 1879
Location	Plav-Gusinje, Montenegro 42.640240°N 19.939606°E
Result	League of Prizren victory

Belligerents
Montenegro	League of Prizren

Commanders and leaders
Marko Miljanov; Todor Miljanov Vuković; Miljan Vukov Vešović	Ali Pasha of Gusinje; Baca Kurti; Jakup Ferri †; Ahmet Zenel Gjonbalaj; Cel Shabani; Mic Sokoli; Haxhi Mulla Jaha; Kadri Bajri (Commander of Rugova forces); Myrtez-aga Batusha (Commander of Reka e Keqë forces); Haxhi Brahimi (Bajraktar of Gashi) †; Isuf Karna (Bajraktar of Krasniqi); Omer Bashulaj (Bajraktar of Plav) †; Husein-beg Rexhepagaj; Matko Laliçaj; Husein Bekteshaj; Bilal-aga Shehu; Arif Bashi †; Idriz Seferi

Units involved
Kuči battalion; Vasojevići battalions: Morača-Rovci battalion; Lijeva Rijeka battalion; Bratonožići battalion	Albanian irregulars of the League of Prizren: Scutari Vilayet (Plav and Gusinje); Kosovo Vilayet; 100 men of Idriz Seferi’s Cheta

Strength
4,600–6,000	2,100
- Location within modern-day Montenegro

The Battle of Novšiće (Serbian: Boj na Novšiću/Бој на Новшићу; Bitka na Novšićima/Битка на Новшићима, Albanian: Beteja e Nokshiqit) was a battle for control over Plav and Gusinje fought on 4 December 1879 between forces of the Principality of Montenegro led by Marko Miljanov and local pro-Ottoman forces which included irregulars of the League of Prizren, both commanded by Ali Pasha, the Kaymekam of Gusinje. The League of Prizren consisted mainly of Albanians from Plav and Gusinje in Scutari Vilayet and irregulars from Kosovo Vilayet.

This battle followed the Montenegrin–Ottoman War of 1876–1878. The Ottoman Empire had avoided providing conditions for the peaceful cession of Plav and Gusinje to Montenegro, as agreed in the Treaty of Berlin (1878). To straighten their position at the Congress of Berlin and later to avoid fulfillment of their obligations by the terms of the treaty, the Ottomans unofficially supported the League of Prizren which mobilized at least 14,000–15,000 pro-Ottoman irregulars. Plav and Gusinje were predominantly populated by pro-Ottoman Muslims and Albanians who opposed the cession to the predominantly Christian-populated Montenegro. They paid all the income of their waqif to the chieftains of neighboring Albanian tribes who belonged to the League of Prizren to support them with their forces. The League of Prizren forces were put under the command of the Ottoman kaymakam of Gusinje, Ali Pasha.

The Montenegrin forces of four battalions with 4,000–6,000 men were positioned along the demarcation line near the villages of Velika and Murino. Until the end of November 1879 they were under the command of voivode Petrović, who strictly respected instructions of the Montenegrin government to employ static and defensive tactics. At the beginning of December 1879 Montenegrin Prince Nicholas appointed Marko Miljanov, instead of Petrović. On 4 December 1879 a skirmish in Velika evolved into a battle when the Montenegrin forces advanced into Ottoman territory. Two battalions commanded by Miljanov quickly advanced without securing their flanks. The League of Prizren forces ambushed and surrounded them near the village of Novšiće. After several hours of fighting, an additional two Montenegrin battalions commanded by Vuković arrived and relieved forces under Miljanov from the encirclement and secured their retreat. Both sides suffered significant casualties.

In 1880, the Ottomans ceded the seaport of Ulcinj to Montenegro, instead of the two towns of Plav and Gusinje. Since the Ottomans completely lost control over the League of Prizren, they disestablished it and crushed their forces in April 1881. Ali Pasha of Gusinje was promoted to the position of mutasarrıf of the Sanjak of İpek and awarded the title of beylerbey. After a fierce disagreement with Prince Nikola in 1882, Miljanov decided to retire from public life to his native Medun. In 1912 Montenegro formally annexed Plav and Gusinje.

== Background ==
=== Treaty of Berlin and League of Prizren ===
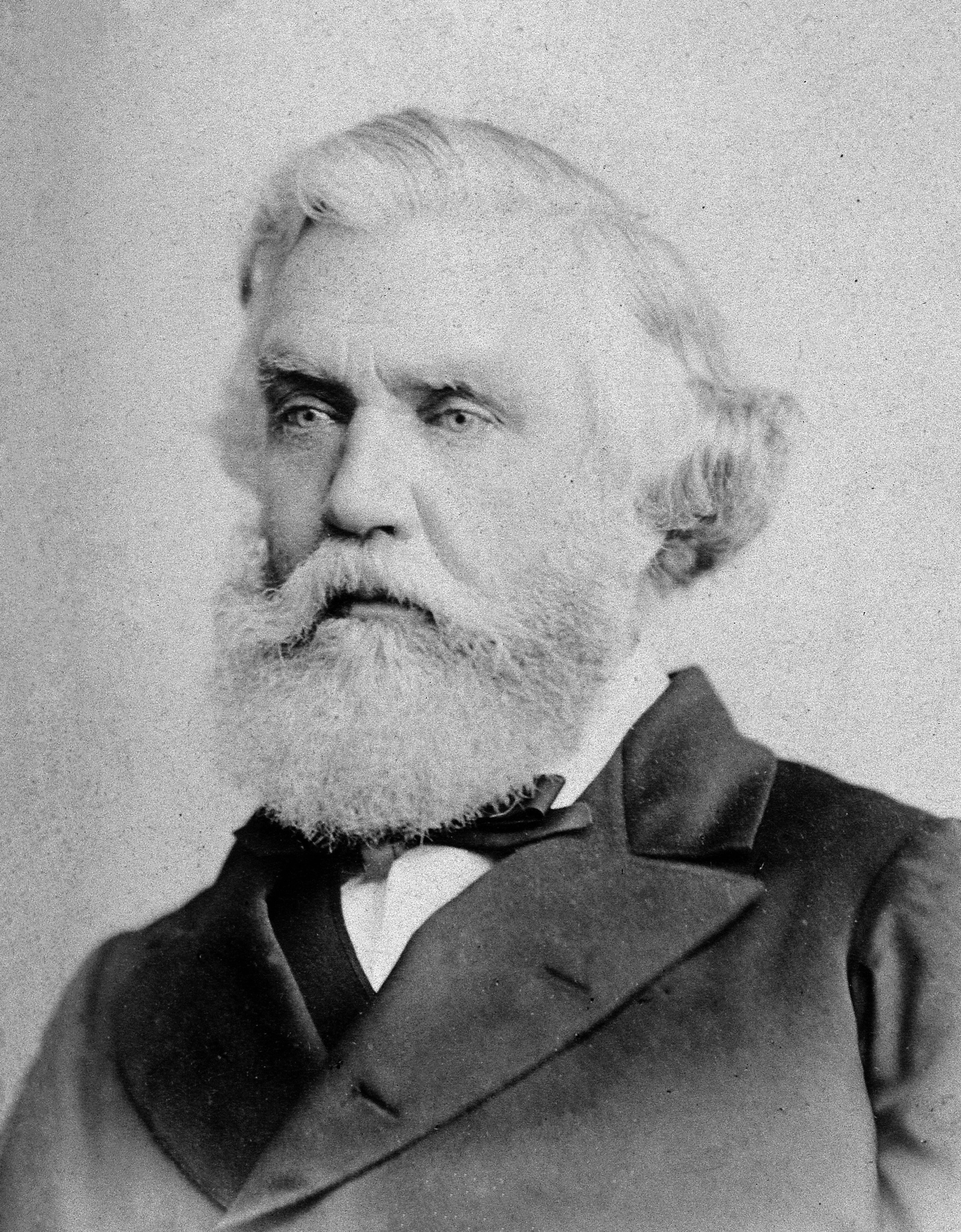
The British Ambassador at Istanbul Austen Henry Layard emphasized that Ottomans would be held responsible for the consequences of influx of armed bands into the region of Plav and Gusinje.

The Battle of Novšiće followed the Montenegrin–Ottoman War (1876–78), which the Ottomans had lost. The Ottoman Empire had accepted de jure the independence of Montenegro, which received certain territorial gains. According to the Treaty of Berlin the territories of Plav and Gusinje (then part of Scutari Vilayet in the Ottoman Empire) were awarded to Montenegro, in compensation for territories in Herzegovina captured by Montenegro during the war. Until October 1879 the Montenegrin forces were able to march into this territory without any resistance. However, when Montenegrins prepared forces for a military expedition in Plav and Gusinje, the Ottomans intervened with the Great Powers to stop it, in order to avoid eventual conflicts. Diplomacy of Austria-Hungary emphasized that Montenegro would use Plav and Gusinje as a foothold to realize its territorial aspirations toward Metohija. The common interest brought together former enemies, the Ottoman forces of Plav and Gusinje with Albanian irregulars from the Prizren League. The Muslim population of Plav and Gusinje was afraid that they would suffer the same destiny previously experienced by Muslim population of Nikšić and Kolašin.

The Ottomans were officially intentioned to respect their obligations, however, in reality, they supported the League of Prizren. The Ottoman governor of Scutari sent ammunitions to Gusinje to be distributed to the local population. Thousands of armed irregulars were mobilized by the League of Prizren all over the region and gathered in Plav and Gusinje. The British Ambassador at Istanbul Austen Henry Layard informed his government that the Ottoman Empire did nothing to prevent the influx of armed bands into the region of Gusinje and emphasized that the High Porte would be held responsible for the consequences. Since October 1879 there were numerous skirmishes between the Montenegrin forces and irregulars.

== Prelude ==
=== Montenegrin forces ===
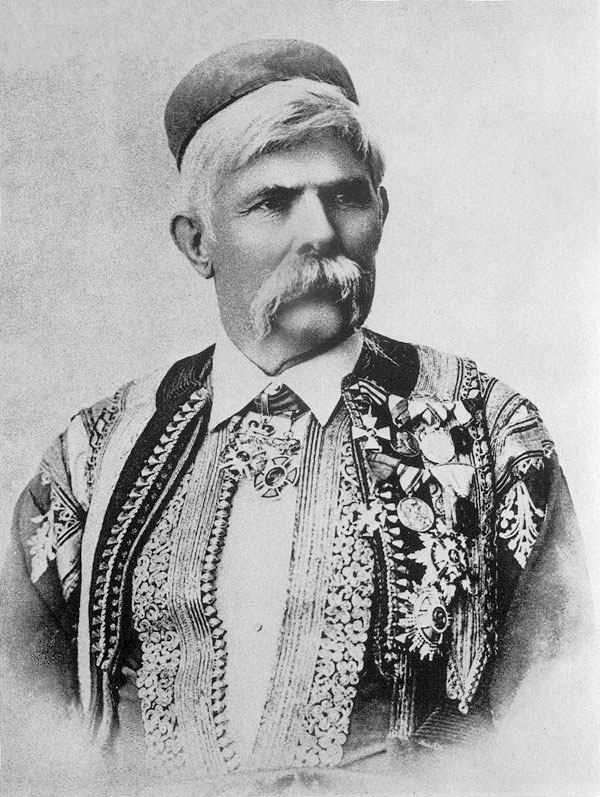
Marko Miljanov, commander of Montenegrin forces in the Battle of Novšiće

Until the end of November 1879 the supreme commander of Montenegrin forces, positioned at the demarcation line toward Plav and Gusinje was voivode Blažo Petrović, member of the ruling Petrović dynasty. At the end of November prince Nicholas I of Montenegro removed Petrović from his position with the explanation that his presence on that position was temporary cancelled as unnecessary. The prince appointed Marko Miljanov on the position of commander of this part of Montenegrin forces. Miljanov was appointed as member of the neighboring Kuči tribe, who knew very well the territory of Plav and Gusinje and also the customs of its population. Miljan Vukov Vešović, an elderly voivode of Vasojevići, was appointed as Miljanov's advisor with position in Andrijevica. According to some speculations, the prince knew that an eventual success of this campaign would not bring much glory to the Montenegrin side, while eventual failure could significantly discredit the Montenegrin commanders. That is why the prince removed a member of his dynasty from the commanding position and appointed Miljanov as commander and Vešović as his advisor, both being his political enemies. Some authors speculated that Prince Nicholas appointed Marko Miljanov as responsible for the takeover of Plav and Gusinje, knowing that his forces would be attacked by much stronger forces, because Nicholas wanted his political enemy Miljanov dead.

Miljanov was very enthusiastic with the opportunity to capture Plav and Gusinje. He was convinced that he was going to punish Ali Bey of Gusinje for his misdeeds. Vešović advised him to be very careful, otherwise Ali Bey might be promoted to Ali Pasha (which eventually happened).

The Montenegrin forces were organized along tribal lines. After the war with Ottomans Montenegro had demobilized part of its forces, expecting a peaceful takeover of the areas of Plav and Gusinje. Also Montenegro was short of food for larger number of soldiers due to the drought of 1879. The Montenegrin forces that participated in this battle were composed of four battalions. Two battalions of Kuči and Bratonožići tribes were under direct command of Miljanov and positioned in Andrijevica, along the demarcation line near village Murino. Two Vasojevići battalions (Moračko-Rovački and Ljevorečki) were commanded by Todor Miljanov Vuković and positioned in Berane along the demarcation line near the village of Velika. They all had between 4,000 and 6,000 men (out of whom one thousand did not directly participate in the battle).

=== Prizren League and other Pro-Ottoman forces ===
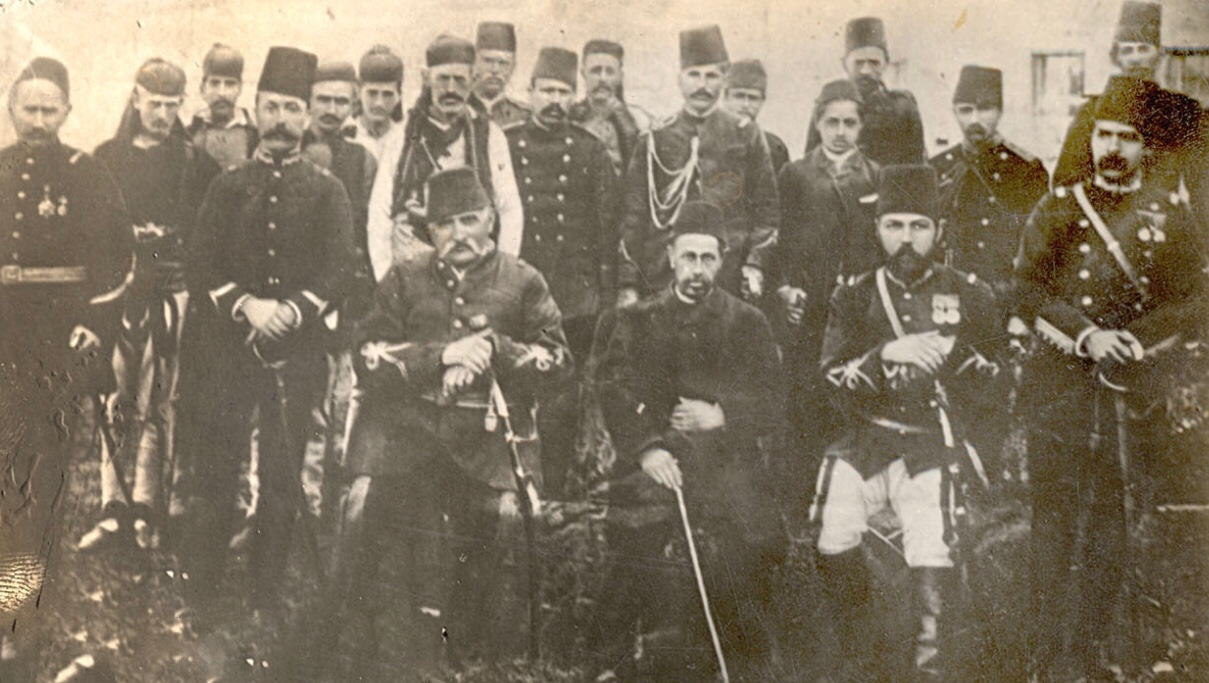
Picture of Ali Pasha (sitting, first from the left) with Haxhi Zeka (sitting in the middle) and some other members of Prizren League

In the Autumn of 1879 notables of Plav and Gusinje established the Committee of National Salvation. The first order of the Committee was to send Jakup Ferri to visit neighboring Albanian tribes to offer them an alliance. It was also decided that Ferri will carry all income of Plav vaqif to pay to Albanian chieftains to accept this alliance. Against the orders of Ali Bey prepared 12-15 kilometers long and 2 meters wide trenches.

The pro-Ottoman forces of 2,100 were gathered in Gusinje and put under command of the Ottoman kaymakam of Gusinje, Ali Bey of Gusinje (later known as Ali Pasha of Gusinje). Notable commanders of the pro-Ottoman forces include Haxhi Mulla Jaha (Jahja efendi Musić), Jakup Ferri, Husein Bekteshaj, Omer Bashulaj and Husein-beg Rexhepagaj.

Numerous pro-Ottoman forces were mobilized by the Prizren League. The Ottoman military officer Muhtar Pasha arrived to Prizren in November 1879. He had 15 battalions of Ottoman soldiers there. The Ottomans informed Montenegrins that this forces would be used to provide peaceful takeover of Plav and Gusinje by Montenegro. Montenegro complained to Great Powers and accused Ottomans that their actions contradict to their promises because Ottoman forces under Muhtar Pasha were used not for peaceful cession of Plav and Gusinje to Montenegro. Instead they were used to organize and support irregulars in their actions against Montenegro.

There are different estimations about the composition of the Ottoman forces, regarding the eventual presence of the officers and soldiers of regular Ottoman army. Overall, Ali Pasha had mobilized some 10,000-20,000 Albanian men.

== Battle ==
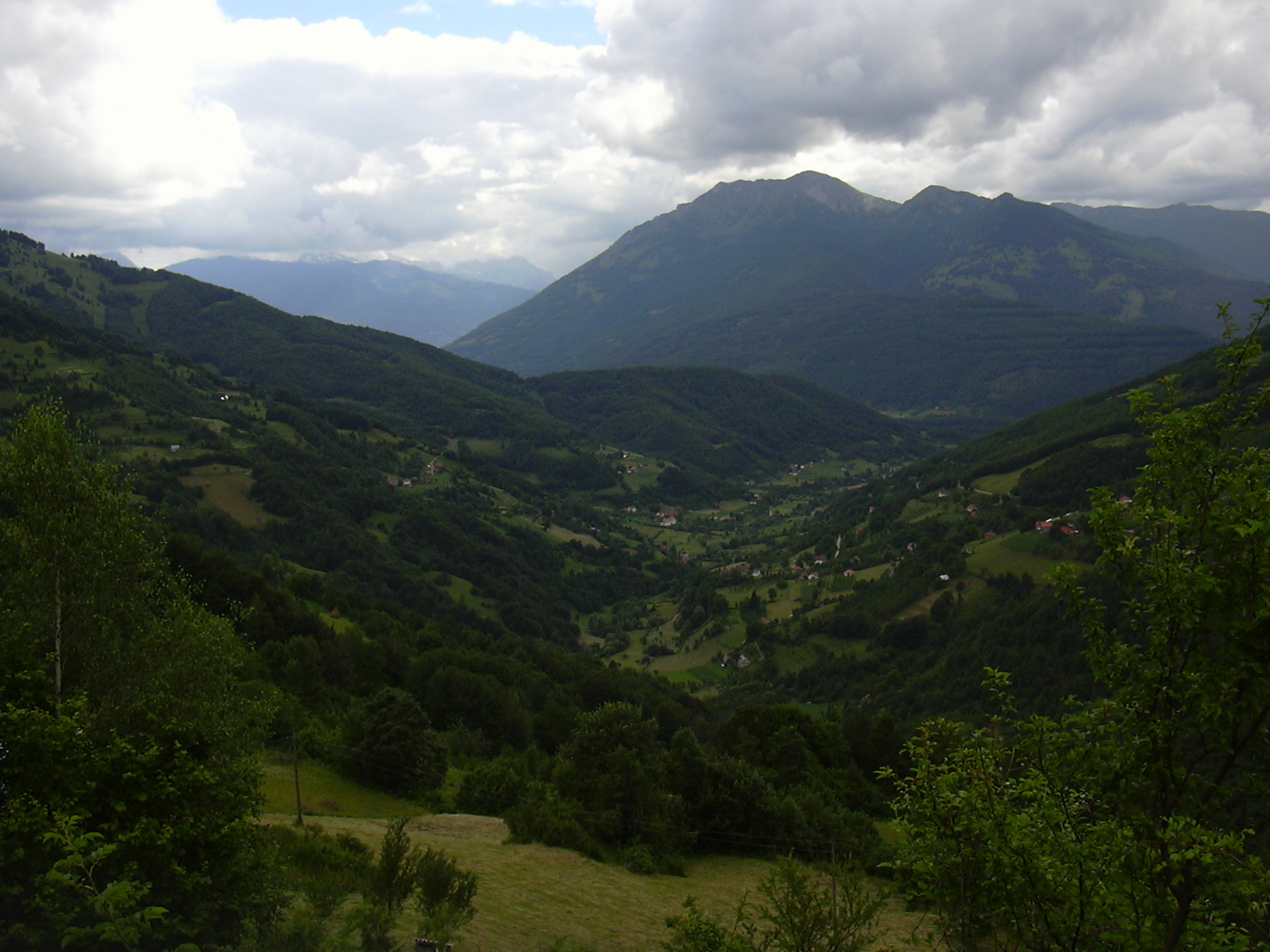
View of Velika in 2012

The battle evolved from one skirmish of 4 December 1879 that was similar to many other taking place in this region since October of the same year. On that day a detachment of the pro-Ottoman irregulars attacked Montenegrin guards in the village Velika and forced them to retreat. Two Vasojevići battalions commanded by Todor Miljanov Vuković pushed the attackers back and chased them across the demarcation line, towards Plav.

Although the Montenegrin forces were ordered to employ the defensive tactics in case of the conflict, Miljanov decided to use this incursion of Montenegrin forces under Vuković and on the same day crossed the demarcation line advancing with two battalions (of Kuči and Bratonožići) into the territory of Plav. They crossed the bridge over river Lim south of the village Murino and quickly advanced toward Plav and Gusinje along the river Lim. Initially, the Montenegrin forces advanced undisturbed, which led them to conclusion that they were not expected or that the pro-Ottoman forces were not well organized, so they left their flanks unsecured. When they reached the narrow part of the valley surrounded by high hills near the village of Novšiće, the pro-Ottoman forces attacked them. Without secured flanks the Montenegrin forces soon found themselves surrounded and stuck in the deep snow. For hours they repelled numerous attacks while both sides suffered heavy casualties. Prominent commanders of the pro-Ottoman forces Jakup Ferri and Omer Bashulaj, the bajraktar of Plav, were killed at the beginning of the battle. Arif Bashi, another commander of the pro-Ottoman forces from Plav, also died in this battle. The pro-Ottoman forces from Plav were initially forced to retreat until around 600 fighters from Rugova attacked Montenegrin flanks from the direction of Ječmište.

In the evening of 4 December two Vasojevići Montenegrin battalions (Moračko-Rovački and Ljevorečki) commanded by Todor Miljanov Vuković reached the battlefield in Novšići and released surrendered forces of Miljanov securing their retreat. Pavel Rovinsky reported that 109 Montenegrin soldiers were killed and 115 wounded in this battle. The forces under command of Vuković did not suffer significant casualties. The casualties of the pro-Ottoman side were around 250 men. The forces of Ali Pasha defeated Montenegrin troops in the Battle of Novšiće with his forces bringing back some sixty heads to Gusinje. Some sources say that the Ottoman irregulars beheaded 220 Montenegrin soldiers and for six months kept their heads impaled on the sticks.

== Aftermath ==
=== Battle of Murino ===
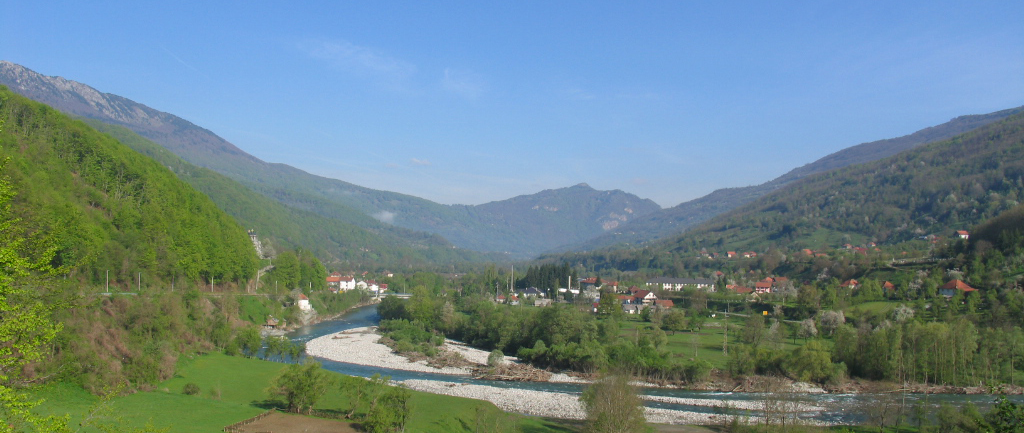
View of Murino in 2011

The battle at Murino occurred about a month later after the battle of Novšiće (December 4, 1879) as the Ottoman high command was preparing to send troops from Monastir under Ahmed Muhtar Pasha in order to pacify local resistance to the annexation. The Montenegrin forces moved from Pepići against the positions in Metej, near Plava when they were intercepted by the League of Prizren. After the skirmish, the Montenegrin forces withdrew to Sutjeska, near Andrijevica and Albanian irregulars burned down the Vasojevići settlements, Velika, Ržanica and Pepići. Both sides after the battle claimed victory. These claims were often embellished with anecdotal stories. Prince Nicholas of Montenegro claimed that the defeat of the Albanians "was so devastating, that Montenegrin forces finished the battle before the night had fallen" and another news article in Montenegro, claimed that 221 noses from fallen Albanians were brought to commander Todor Miljanov.

=== Outcome and significance ===
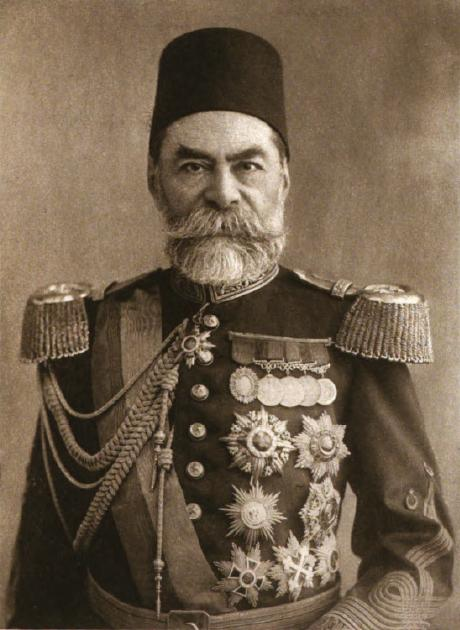
After the Battle of Novšiće Ahmed Muhtar Pasha invited population of Plav and Gusinje to accept peaceful cession to Montenegro

The Battle of Novšiće was not very significant from the military point of view. If it had happened during the Montenegrin–Ottoman War (1876–78), it would probably have remained hardly noticed. The contemporary circumstances resulted with its significant political consequences. The main consequences of the Battle of Novšiće were strengthening of the positions of the League of Prizren and losing any chance for Montenegrins to soon capture Plav and Gusinje. The battle cast a certain shadow on the exceptional Montenegrin military reputation, gave some confidence to Albanians and significantly affected the position of prince Nicholas and his government. Both parties claimed victory after this battle, underestimating own casualties and overestimating enemy casualties. The Montenegrin government tried to conceal the military defeat and published information about 85 killed and 107 wounded Montenegrins as opposed to 1,000 killed and wounded enemy soldiers.

The Ottoman sultan promoted Ali Bey to higher military rank (beylerbey) and awarded him with enough money to build a mosque in Plav, the Sultanija. Only after the Battle of Novšiće the Ottoman governor Ahmed Muhtar Pasha issued a proclamation to the population of Plav and Gusinje instructing them to accept a peaceful cession to Montenegro. Since this was proven impossible without bloodbath, the Ottoman Empire ceded Ulcinj to Montenegro in 1880 as compensation for Plav and Gusinje. Soon the Ottomans completely lost control over the League of Prizren which fell under the influence of pro-Austrian Albanian nationalists, so the Ottomans had to defeat the irregulars of the league in April 1881. The Ottoman state gave Ali Pasha forestland for his defense of Gusinje against the Montenegrins and later he sent some Albanian youths from the region for training and service in the palace guard of sultan Abdulhamid II. In 1881 the Ottomans promoted Ali Pasha to the position of mutasarrıf of the Sanjak of İpek. Plav and Gusinje remained in the Ottoman Empire until 1912/1913 when they were occupied and annexed by Montenegro.

== Legacy ==
This battle inspired poets of both sides that participated in it. The Ottomans made up a mockery song. The poetry of Muslims include description of the horse of Jakup Ferri that ran through the battlefield after the death of his master. Albanian epic poem The Highland Lute, written in 1937, mentions this battle and Jakup Ferri, who fought and died on the battlefield for the cause of an independent Albanian state.

There are several poems about this battle composed by the Vasojevići tribe. Pavel Rovinsky, who was a medic in the Montenegrin army, decided to publish (in 1902) a song "The Battles in Polimlje" (Serbian: Бојеви у Полимљу), based on the singing of Muslim gusle player Osman Abdulah descending from the Kuči tribe. According to this song the pro-Ottoman forces included many neighbouring Albanian tribes led by their bayraktars. The Krasniqi by Man Avdija, Gashi by Ali Ibra, tribes from Dukagjini by Mustafa bayraktar, tribes from Peja by Mahmudbegaj, from Gjakova by Saitbegaj and some by Salih-Aga. According to the legend, before the battle began advancing Montenegrin forces noticed gusle player Osman Abdulah spying on them, so they captured him. When he explained that he just wanted to personally witness the battle so he could make song about it, Miljanov ordered his release.

On 12 August 2014 in the village Gornja Ržanica near Plav a monument was erected in honor of the Montenegrin soldiers killed in this battle.

== Sources ==
- Ražnatović, Novak (1979). Crna Gora i Berlinski kongres. Obod.
- Institut za istoriju Sarajevo (1979). Prilozi. Vol. 16. Institut za istoriju Sarajevo. pp. 60–69.
- Savez društava istoričara Jugoslavije (1983). Nastava povijesti. Savez društava istoričara Jugoslavije. p. 187.
- King Nikola I (1969). Cjelokupna djela. p. 567.
- Istorijski institut u Titogradu (1982). Istorijski zapisi. Vol. 35. Istorijski institut u Titogradu. pp. 66, 71.
- Šarkinović, Hamdija (2012). Bošnjaci od načertanija do memoranduma. Matica Bošnjaka Crne Gore. ISBN 978-9940-9416-0-4.
- Dedushaj, Rexhep. Krahina e Plave e Gucis Neper Shekuj.
