= Jashar Rexhepagiq =

Yugoslavian scholar and author

Jashar Rexhepagiq (Serbo-Croatian: Jašar Redžepagić; 1929–2010) was an ethnic Albanian and Kosovar scholar and writer. Jashar Rexhepagiq was born in Plav in Montenegro and went to school in Berane and Pejë. He studied education at the University of Zagreb where he finished his doctorate in 1965. Rexhepagiq taught school in Prizren and later as a professor of education taught at the University of Prishtina until 1990. He was an active member of the Academy of Sciences and Arts of Kosova until his retirement from public life.

== Works ==
=== Albanian ===
- Tema pedagogjike bashkëkohore – (1966)
- Zhvillimi i shkollave dhe i arsimit të shqiptarëve në territorin e Jugosllavisë së sotme deri në vitin 1918 – (1970)
- Tema të zgjedhura pedagogjike – (1972)
- Hyrje në metodologjinë e punës kërkimore shkencore – (1972)
- Zhvillimi dhe veçoritë e shkollave turke në territorin e Jugosllavisë deri më 1912 – (1987)
- Etika e arsimtarit sot – (1989)
- Sami Frashëri dhe pedagogjia e Rilindjes Kombëtare – (1996, 2005)
- Shkolla Normale "Sami Frashëri" në Prishtinë: 1941–1944 – (1997)
- Dervishët, rendet dhe teqetë në Kosovë, në Sanxhak e në rajonet tjera përreth, në të kaluarën dhe sot – (1999, 2003)
- Tema të zgjedhura dhe bashkëkohore pedagogjike – (2002)
- Çështje fundamentale në pedagogjinë ndërkombëtare – (2008)

=== Serbo-Croatian ===
- Razvoj prosvjete i školstva albanske narodnosti na teritoriji današnje Jugoslavije do 1918 – (1968)
- Pedagogija radne škole – (1972)
- Školstvo i prosveta na Kosovu od kraja XVIII stoljeċa do 1918 – (1974)
- Velika medresa u Skoplju: 1925–1941 – (1977)
- Pedagoški pogledi Hegela – (1980)
- Ruka na ruci, pjesme (1985)
- Rukosani, pjesme (1991)
- Svitanice, pjesme (1994)
- Islamsko-persijska kultura i uticaj persijskog jezika u nas – (1996)
- Boje u kapima kiše, pjesme (1997
- Pedagoške i psihološke ideje u delima Muhameda Abdagića i Ćamila Sijarića – (1997)
- Pedagoško-literarne refleksije i odzivi:Prilog obrazovanju u Sandžaku – (1998)
- Na raskršću vremena: Od Kapetanovića do Mušovića – (2007)
