= Bogajići =

Bogajići Богајићи
- Village
- Location within Montenegro
- Coordinates: 42.583825°N 19.953355°E
- Country: Montenegro
- Municipality: Plav

Population (2011)
  - Total: 441
- Time zone: UTC+1 (CET)
  - Summer (DST): UTC+2 (CEST)

Bogajići (Serbian Cyrillic: Богајићи) is a village in the municipality of Plav, Montenegro.

== Demographics ==
According to the 2011 census, its population was 441. The population is majority Muslim. The Albanians of this village speak with the Gheg dialect of the Albanian language.

Ethnicity in 2011
Ethnicity	Number	Percentage
Bosniaks	405	91.8%
Albanians	13	2.9%
other/undeclared	23	5.2%
Total	441	100%
