= Gornja Ržanica =

Gornja Ržanica Горња Ржaница Zhanica
- Village
- Location within Montenegro
- Coordinates: 42.662602°N 19.916056°E
- Country: Montenegro
- Municipality: Plav

Population (2011)
  - Total: 248
- Time zone: UTC+1 (CET)
  - Summer (DST): UTC+2 (CEST)

Gornja Ržanica (Serbian Cyrillic: Горња Ржaница; Albanian: Zhanica) is a village in the municipality of Plav, Montenegro.

== Demographics ==
According to the 2011 census, its population was 248.

Ethnicity in 2011
Ethnicity	Number	Percentage
Serbs	203	81.9%
Montenegrins	24	9.7%
Albanians	18	7.3%
other/undeclared	3	1.2%
Total	248	100%
