= Zogović =

- Language: Montenegrin

Origin
- Language: Albanian
- Origin: Zog
- Meaning: bird

Zogović is a Montenegrin surname often found in Montenegro and derived from the given name Zog, which is of Albanian origin. According to Šimunović, this surname is also found in Dalmatia and is derived from the Albanian word zog 'bird'.

== See also ==
- Bojan Zogović, a Montenegrin football goalkeeper
- Radovan Zogović, (August 19, 1907 – January 5, 1986), a Montenegrin poet

== Sources ==
- Pantelić, Nikola (1998). Etnički odnosi Srba sa drugim narodima i etničkim zajednicama. Etnografski institut SANU. ISBN 9788675870234.
- Petar Šimunović (1995). Hrvatska prezimena: podrijetlo, značenje, rasprostranjenost. Golden Marketing. ISBN 978-953-6168-16-3.
