= Đurička Rijeka =

Đurička Rijeka Ђуричка Ријека Gjuriq
- Village
- Location within Montenegro
- Coordinates: 42.578627°N 19.936269°E
- Country: Montenegro
- Municipality: Plav

Population (2011)
  - Total: 254
- Time zone: UTC+1 (CET)
  - Summer (DST): UTC+2 (CEST)

Đurička Rijeka (Serbian Cyrillic: Ђуричка Ријека; Albanian: Gjuriqi) is a village in the municipality of Plav, Montenegro.

== Demographics ==
According to the 2011 census, its population was 254.

Ethnicity in 2011
Ethnicity	Number	Percentage
Albanians	100	39.4%
Bosniaks	93	36.6%
Serbs	43	16.9%
other/undeclared	18	7.1%
Total	254	100%
