= Skić =

Skić Скић
- Village
- Location within Montenegro
- Coordinates: 42.606729°N 19.941838°E
- Country: Montenegro
- Municipality: Plav

Population (2011)
  - Total: 286
- Time zone: UTC+1 (CET)
  - Summer (DST): UTC+2 (CEST)

Skić (Serbian Cyrillic: Скић) is a village in the municipality of Plav, Montenegro.

== Demographics ==
According to the 2011 census, its population was 286. The majority of the village are Muslims.

Ethnicity in 2011
Ethnicity	Number	Percentage
Bosniaks	232	81.1%
Serbs	33	11.5%
other/undeclared	12	7.3%
Total	286	100%
