= Lake Visitor =

Lake in Montenegro

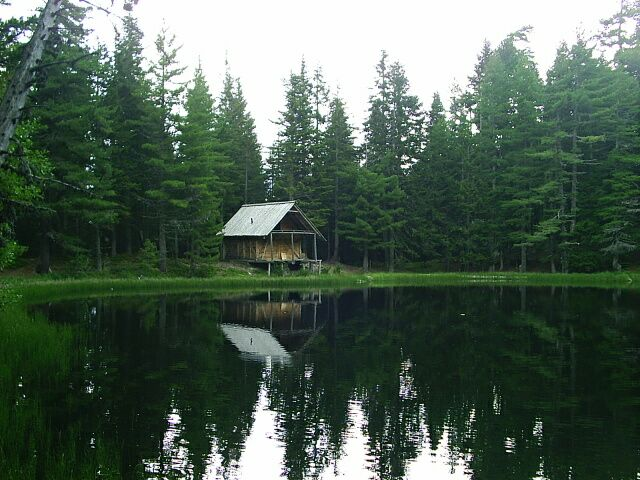

- Location of Lake Visitor in Montenegro Lake Visitor (Balkans) Lake Visitor (Mediterranean)
- Location: Plav
- Coordinates: 42°37′30″N 19°52′48″E
- Basin countries: Montenegro
- Max. length: 110 m (360 ft)
- Max. width: 75 m (246 ft)

Lake Visitor (Serbian: Виситорско језеро, romanized: Visitorsko jezero) is a lake in the Plav Municipality, Montenegro.

It is a mountain lake, noted for its floating island.
