= Vojno Selo =

Vojno Selo Војно Село Vojosellë
- Village
- Location within Montenegro
- Coordinates: 42.579224°N 19.917370°E
- Country: Montenegro
- Municipality: Plav

Population (2011)
  - Total: 642
- Time zone: UTC+1 (CET)
  - Summer (DST): UTC+2 (CEST)

Vojno Selo (Serbian Cyrillic: Војно Село; Albanian: Vojosellë) is a village in the municipality of Plav, Montenegro.

== Demographics ==
According to the 2011 census, its population was 642.

Ethnicity in 2011
Ethnicity	Number	Percentage
Bosniaks	299	46.6%
Albanians	152	23.7%
Serbs	137	21.3%
Montenegrins	38	5.9%
other/undeclared	35	3.8%
Total	642	100%
