= Jakup Ferri =

Albanian activist

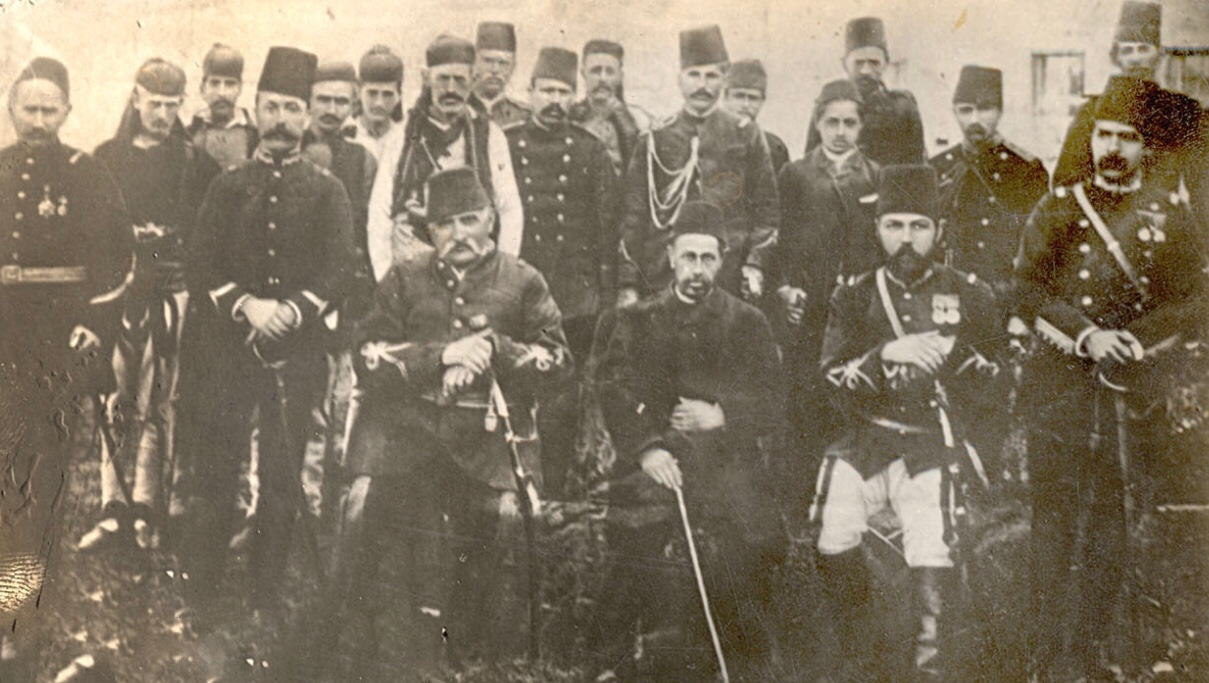
- Members of the League of Prizren, with Ali Pashë Gucia (sitting) first from the left on the first row and Jakup Ferri (standing) behind him.
- Born: c. 1832; Plav, Ottoman Empire
- Died: 4 December 1879; Nokshiq, Ottoman Empire

Jakup Ferri (c.1832 – 4 December 1879) was an Albanian warrior from Plav-Gusinje who served as a local leader in the League of Prizren's resistance during the Principality of Montenegro's attempt to subjugate his homeland in 1879. He was distinguished in the Battle of Novšiće, where he died.

== Family ==
He was born in 1832 to an ethnic Albanian family in Plav. His father, Ferr Duri, descended from the Kuçi tribe. His great-great-grandfather, Gjergj Prentashi, with his brother, had left Kuči for Podgorica and then settled in Plav, where they converted to Islam. His great-grandfather, Shaban, had two sons, Halil and Dur. In turn, Dur had two sons, Hajro and Ferr, the father of Jakup Ferri. He had three brothers, Zeqo, Shaqir and Beqir, who died in the battle of Nokshić. His mother was Zyl Rexha. At the age of 25, Jakup Ferri was married to Pemba, a cousin of Ali Pasha of Gusinje. He had five sons (Hasan, Mehmed, Omer, Agan, Emin) and three daughters (Kushe, Bardhoke, Zadeja). His descendants in Montenegro adopted the surname Ferović. In time, they were revert to the previous surname.

His son Hasan Ferri (1860–1946) fought together with his father in this battle. In WWII, the Ferri family largely supported Balli Kombëtar and organizations adjacent to it like the Second League of Prizren. Jakup Ferri's grandson Riza (son of Mehmed) was prefect of Dibra in WWII during the annexation of that area in Albania. He committed suicide in Shkodër in 1945 at the eve of his extradition to Yugoslavia, where he was to be tried for war crimes. In wartime, his other grandson, Shemsi (son of Agan) was the prefect of Plav and a delegate of the Second League of Prizren for that area.

The participation of the Ferri family in Balli Kombëtar - a pro-fascist organization - was cause for Jakup Ferri's exclusion in much of post-war historiography in the People's Republic of Albania about the Albanian National Awakening. In 1979, on the 100th anniversary of the creation of the League of Prizren with the personal intervention of Mehmet Shehu, Jakup Ferri was excluded from the list of those who were honoured as "Heroes of the Nation" (Hero i Kombit). After 1990, the historical rehabilitation of Jakup Ferri and his son began, and they were honoured for their service to the nation.

== Battle of Novšiće ==
He was an active insurgent against the Montenegrin annexation of Plav and Gusinje after 1878. He joined the League of Prizren, established after the Congress of Berlin (1878) that ceded Plav and Gusinje to Montenegro. In 1878, together with many other fighters from Gjakova, they assassinated the Ottoman general Mehmet Ali Pasha who had been sent to pacify the region and force the locals to accept the decisions of the Great Powers.

In the autumn of 1879, notables of Plav and Gusinje established the local Committee of National Salvation. One of its first decisions concerned the diversion to the war effort of all taxes that had been collected and the support of the troops with resources. Jakup Ferri was responsible in the region for the organization of the war effort and its resources. Ali Pasha of Gusinje, the leader of the League, appointed him commander for the defence of Plav. He commanded his forces in the retreat from the Montenegrin assaults and managed to cut off the Montenegrins when they counter-attacked. Jakup Ferri fell at the beginning of the Battle of Novšiće, which ended in a victory for the League. On 4 January 1880, Jakup Ferri would be wounded in the battle on the banks of the Lim - which was part of the greater Battle of Nokshiq. He was found standing against the wall of a mountain with 7 wounds and 30 heads surrounding him that he had cut off of the enemy soldiers. Ferri would pass away on 11 January as a result of his wounds. His actions in 1879 made him a hero of Albanian and Bosniak folk poetry together with Ali Pasha Gucia. In literature, Jakup Ferri is a central character in Gjergj Fishta's The Highland Lute in the chapters (kangë) about the defense of Plav against Montenegro.
