= Radončić =

Radončić (Cyrillic: Радончић) is a surname found mostly in Montenegro and the Sandžak region of Serbia. In those areas, it is related with the Radončić brotherhood of Old Kuči. The village Radona with 55 households is attested in the nahiya of Kuči in the defter of the Sanjak of Scutari in 1485. The Radončić family claims descent from Vujošević who are of the Đurđević branch of old Kuči. Marko Miljanov says ultimately the Radončić are from Đurađ Pantin. Notable people with the surname include:

- Dino Radončić (born 1999), Montenegrin professional basketball player
- Dženan Radončić (born 1983), Montenegrin footballer
- Fahrudin Radončić (born 1957), Bosnian businessman and politician
- Muamer Zukorlić (1970–2021), Serbian politician
