= Mašnica =

Mašnica Машница
- Village
- Location within Montenegro
- Coordinates: 42.667092°N 19.886460°E
- Country: Montenegro
- Municipality: Plav

Population (2011)
  - Total: 262
- Time zone: UTC+1 (CET)
  - Summer (DST): UTC+2 (CEST)

Mašnica (Serbian Cyrillic: Машница) is a village in the municipality of Plav, Montenegro.

== Demographics ==
According to the 2011 census, its population was 262.

Ethnicity in 2011
| Ethnicity | Number | Percentage |
|---|---|---|
| Serbs | 200 | 76.3% |
| Montenegrins | 51 | 19.5% |
| other/undeclared | 11 | 4.2% |
| Total | 262 | 100% |
