= Meteh =

Meteh Метех
- Village
- Location within Montenegro
- Coordinates: 42.630288°N 19.994937°E
- Country: Montenegro
- Municipality: Plav

Population (2011)
  - Total: 312
- Time zone: UTC+1 (CET)
  - Summer (DST): UTC+2 (CEST)

Meteh (Cyrillic: Метех) is a village in the municipality of Plav, Montenegro.

== Demographics ==
According to the 2011 census, its population was 312. The majority of this village are Muslims.

Ethnicity in 2011
Ethnicity	Number	Percentage
Bosniaks	216	69.2%
Serbs	9	2.9%
Montenegrins	9	2.9%
other/undeclared	78	25.0%
Total	312	100%
