= Brezojevica =

Brezojevica Брезојевица
- Village
- Location within Montenegro
- Coordinates: 42.614649°N 19.925797°E
- Country: Montenegro
- Municipality: Plav

Population (2011)
  - Total: 929
- Time zone: UTC+1 (CET)
  - Summer (DST): UTC+2 (CEST)

Brezojevica (Serbian Cyrillic: Брезојевица) is a village in the municipality of Plav, Montenegro.

== Demographics ==
According to the 2011 census, its population was 929.

Ethnicity in 2011
Ethnicity	Number	Percentage
Serbs	595	64.0%
Montenegrins	177	19.1%
Bosniaks	122	13.1%
other/undeclared	35	3.8%
Total	929	100%
