= Sanjak of İpek =

Region of the Ottoman Empire

Sanjak of İpek İpek Sancağı Sanxhaku i Pejës Пећки санџак
- sanjak of Ottoman Empire
- 1520–1913
- Coat of arms

- Sanjak of Ipek in the late 19th century
- Capital: İpek
- History
  - Established: 1520
  - First Balkan War: 1913
Preceded by
Principality of Dukagjini
Succeeded by
Kingdom of Montenegro
Kingdom of Serbia
Principality of Albania
- Today part of: Kosovo; Montenegro; Albania

The Sanjak of İpek (Turkish: İpek Sancağı; Albanian: Sanxhaku i Pejës; Serbian: Пећки санџак, romanized: Pećki sandžak) or Sanjak of Dukakin (Turkish: Dukakin Sancağı; Albanian: Sanxhaku i Dukagjinit; Serbian: Дукађински санџак, romanized: Dukađinski sandžak) was a sanjak (an administrative division of the Ottoman Empire) with its capital in İpek (Peja), now in Kosovo.

== Administration ==
In Fedor Karaczay's 1842 travel memoir, it was reported that the Sanjak of İpek included northeastern Albania and the larger part of the Dukakin plain, and had three kadiluks: Dukakin, İpek, Yakova.

In 1900–1912 the Sanjak of İpek had four kazas: Peja, Gjakova, Gusinje and Berane.

== History ==
Dukakin was firstly the name of an Ottoman kaza (in the Sanjak of Scutari), then in 1520, a sanjak with the name (Dukakin sancak) was established under the Rumelia Eyalet. The name of the sanjak's seat, İpek, was used interchangeably for the sanjak (İpek sancak).

The Sanjak of İpek was often under direct control of the sanjakbey of the Sanjak of Scutari. In 1536 Ali-beg, then a sanjakbey of İpek, was hanged on the orders of the sultan for mistakes and incompetence in governing his sanjak. The Christian population of the sanjak often rebelled against the Ottoman authorities, especially in the 1550s, because they were unable to pay the newly implemented taxes. During one of these rebellions the sanjakbey of Dukakin, Kasim-beg, was ordered to suppress the rebellion with help of the sanjaks of Scutari (İşkodra) and Durazzo (Dıraç) if needed. In 1690 the sanjakbey Mahmud Pasha Hasanbegović attacked Austrian troops in Peja during the Great Turkish War.

At the end of 1737, sanjak-bey Mahmudbegović devastated Vasojevići and persecuted a lot of people in the Sanjak of İpek.

Serbs from Peja informed Russia on killings of over 100 people after 1875, as well as looting of the Patriarchate of Peć and Visoki Dečani. In 1877 the sanjak became part of the new Kosovo Vilayet seated in Skopje.

In 1904, the sanjak was abolished.

During the First Balkan War at the end of 1912, the sanjak was occupied by the Kingdom of Montenegro and Kingdom of Serbia. In 1914 a smaller part of the territory became a part of the newly established Principality of Albania, established on the basis of the peace contract signed during the London Conference in 1913.

== Demographics ==
The Ottoman population records for 1895 indicate 24,852 Muslims and 9,468 Christians in the Sanjak of Ipek.

== List of sanjakbeys ==
- Ali Bey (Serbian: Ali-beg; fl. 1536)
- Ali-beg (–1537)
- Kasim-beg (fl. 1550s)
- Mahmud Pasha (Serbian: Mahmud-paša Hasanbegović; fl. 1690)
- Tahir Pasha Mahmud Bey-zade (fl. 1717)
- Kurd Mehmed Pasha (1727)
- Mahmudbegović (fl. 1737).

== Sources ==
- Mihailović, Kosta (2006). Kosovo and Metohija: past, present, future: papers presented at the International Scholarly Meeting held at the Serbian Academy of Sciences and Arts, Belgrade, March 16–18, 2006. Serbian Academy of Science and Arts. ISBN 9788670254299.
- Stanojević, Gligor; Vasić, Milan (1975). Istorija Crne Gore (3): od početka XVI do kraja XVIII vijeka. Titograd: Redakcija za istoriju Crne Gore. OCLC 799489791.
