= Butcher of Mons =

Unidentified Belgian serial killer from 1996–97

The Butcher of Mons

Details
- Victims: 5
- Span of crimes: 1996–1997
- Country: Belgium
- Date apprehended: Unapprehended

The Butcher of Mons is a media name given to an unidentified serial killer who committed five murders between January 1996 and July 1997 in or near the Belgian city of Mons. The name was chosen because of the highly precise dismemberment of the victims' bodies. Then they were placed in plastic bags "clearly visible on the roadside or on a channel embankment".

== Discoveries ==
On 22 March 1997, police officer Olivier Motte discovered nine garbage bags containing human remains below the Rue Emile Vandervelde in Cuesmes. They were then examined by magistrate Pierre Pilette, who determined that the arms and legs in the bags came from three different bodies, all of them women. Of all the bags, five of them appeared to originate from the municipality of Knokke-Heist. On the following day, a tenth bag was found on the same street.

On 24 March, another bag was discovered, containing the bust of a woman, on the chemin de l'Inquiétude in Mons.

On 12 April, two bags were found in Havré, in the rue du Dépôt, near the Haine river, a tributary of the Scheldt. These bags contained one foot, one leg, and a head.

== The victims ==
The human remains were found in the Mons region, as well as in northern France, between March 1997 and April 1998, in garbage bags. The systematic mutilation of the bodies made their identification difficult. The garbage bags were found in places with evocative names: Avenue des Bassins (a French term for the pelvis), in the river Haine (French for "hatred"), Chemin de l'Inquiétude (French for "concern"), Rue du Dépôt (French for a "deposit"), Chemin de Bethléem (Bethlehem) near the river Trouille (French for "fear"), etc. In addition to the bodies, brightly colored underwear was also found in the bags. All the victims had in common that they frequented the area of Mons railway station, and all were plagued by socio-economic or family issues.

=== Carmelina Russo ===
Russo, 42, disappeared on 4 January 1996. Her pelvis was discovered on 21 January in the Scheldt, in the Nord department in France.

=== Martine Bohn ===
Bohn, 43, a former prostitute from France, went missing on 21 July 1996. That same month, her bust was fished out of the Haine near Mons.

=== Jacqueline Leclercq ===
Leclercq, 33, a mother of four children, went missing on 22 December 1996. Her arms and legs were found by a policeman on 22 March 1997 in one of the trash bags below the rue Emile Vandervelde in Cuesmes.

=== Nathalie Godart ===
Godart, 21, disappeared in March 1997. Her bust was found in the Haine.

=== Begonia Valencia ===
Valencia, 37, disappeared from her home in Frameries in the summer of 1997. Her skull was found in Hyon.

== The investigation ==
A special investigation cell, called the Corpus cell, was created to solve the murders, headed by magistrate Pierre Pilette. However, since the beginning of the investigation, the cell reported that it was lacking staff due to the case being considered "local". Since 2007, the cell has consisted of only four investigators.

== Suspects ==
During the investigation, several people were suspected of being involved in these murders, but no concrete evidence was found against them.

=== Smail Tulja ===
In February 2007, Smail Tulja was arrested in Montenegro at the behest of United States authorities after being suspected of committing the murders in Belgium as well as a similar murder in 1990 of his wife in New York. Tulja was also suspected of committing two murders in Albania. In February 2009, he was charged with the murder of his wife. However, Montenegro refused to extradite him because of his citizenship and he was sentenced in July 2010 by a Montenegrin court to twelve years in prison for the murder of Mary Beal. In 2012, Montenegrin media reported that Tulja died in prison in February of that year.

The identity of the killer - as long as the killings in question are the work of one individual - remains unknown to this day. Between the beginning of the investigation in 1997 and 2010, nearly 1000 complaints were made.

== See also ==
- List of fugitives from justice who disappeared
- List of serial killers by country

== TV documentaries ==
- "The shadow of the butcher of Mons" in Duty of investigation diffused on 29 June 2011, on La Une.
- "The mysterious monster of Mons" (third report) in "... in Brussels" on 30 September, 7 and 15 October 2013, and 8, 15, and 23 September 2014 in Crimes on NRJ 12.
- "Case Leclercq: Skinning the Mons' first report in criminal Chronicles released on 31 May, 7 and 15 June, and 1 and 8 November 2014 on TFX.

== Radio broadcast ==
- "The Mons Detective" in "The Hour of Crime" presented by Jacques Pradel on RTL.
