= Plav, Montenegro =

Town and municipality in Northern Montenegro

Plav Плав Plavë
- Town and municipality
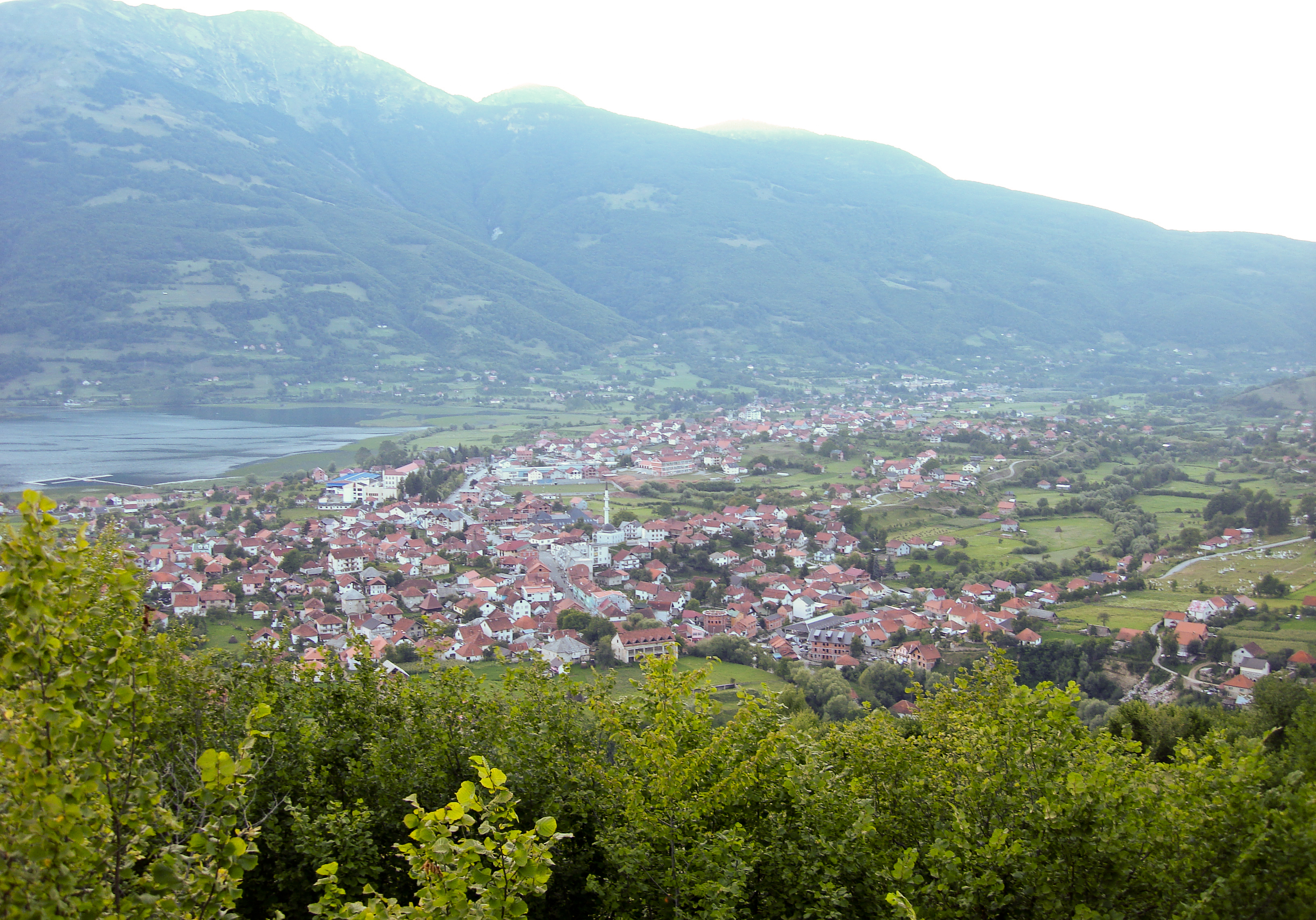
- Panorama of Plav

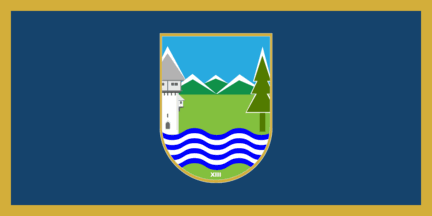
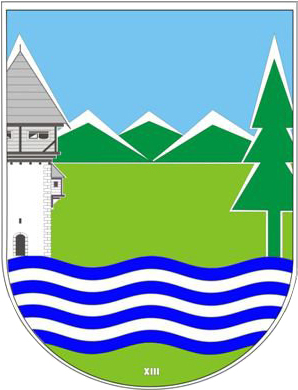
- Flag Coat of arms

- Location within Montenegro
- Coordinates: 42.6°N 19.94°E
- Country: Montenegro
- Region: Northern
- Municipality: Plav
- Settlements: 14

Government
  - Type: Mayor-Assembly
  - Mayor: Nihad Canović (SD)

Area
  - Town and municipality: 328 km^{2} (127 sq mi)

Population (2011 census)
  - Density: 28/km^{2} (73/sq mi)
  - Urban: 3,717
  - Rural: 5,364
  - Municipality: 9,081
- Time zone: UTC+1 (CET)
  - Summer (DST): UTC+2 (CEST)
- Postal code: 84325
- Area code: +382 51
- Car plates: PL
- Climate: Cfb

Plav (Montenegrin Cyrillic: Плав, Albanian: Plavë, Plava) is a town located in the Northern Region of Montenegro, situated along the Lim River, which originates from nearby Lake Plav, a glacial lake at the foot of the Prokletije mountains. It has a population of 3,717 (2011 census). Plav is the centre of Plav Municipality with a population of 9,050.

== Name ==
The name Plav (Плав) is derived from Slavic plav, "a flooded place" (poplava, "flood").

== Geography ==
Plav is located at the foot of the Accursed Mountains range, adjacent to the springs of the river Lim.

The area contains many lakes and the most known is Lake Plav, one of the largest in this region. The lakes Hrid and Visitor are mountain lakes, and Visitor is noted for its floating island.

Plav is also renowned for its karst wells, among which are Ali Pasha of Gucia Springs and Oko Skakavica. Villages in the municipality include Gusinje.

== History ==
The toponym Hotina Gora (mountains of Hoti) in the Plav and Gusinje regions on the Lim river basin in 1330 is the first mention of the Hoti name in historical records in the chrysobulls of Dečani. Šufflay considers this region as the original area of settlement of the Hoti tribe from which they moved southwards.

The Ottoman census organised in 1582-83 registered the Plav nahiyah within the Sanjak of Scutari with 18 villages; according to historian Milan Vasić all inhabitants had personal names with a Slavic character, and no Muslim name was present.

According to a 16th-century travel record by Antonio Bruni, the inhabitants of the Plav region are partly Albanian and partly Serbian, with a large proportion belonging to historical Albanian and Montenegrin tribes such as the Piperi, Kuči, Kelmendi, and Bjelopavlići.

According to the 19th-century French consul Hyacinthe Hecquard, the Ottomans constructed a small fortress near Gusinje along the Grnčar River in 1612. The fort was built specifically to defend the Plav region against incursions by the Kelmendi tribe. Hecquard also recorded oral traditions from Kelmendi chiefs regarding their historical conflicts and tax disputes with the Ottomans following early regional conflicts.

After the Venetian nobleman Mariano Bolizza in Cattaro (Kotor), who wrote the Relazione e descrizione del sangiacato di Scutari ("Relations and Description of the Sanjak of Scutari") in 1614 Plav was mostly inhabited by Albanians under the command of Sem Zaus (Cem Çaushi) of Podgorica.

The two strongest feudal families in the Plav-Gusinje region (~90 km to the northeast of Gruemirë) trace their origin to Gruemiri. The Rexhepagaj of Plav, Montenegro (now, Redžepagić-Rexhepagiqi) moved to Plav in the beginning of the 1650s where their ancestor took the Muslim name Veli when he converted. Rexhep Aga who gave the name to the family was a great-great-grandson of Veli. The Shabanagaj (now also known as Šabanagić) were related via marriage with the Bushati family of Shkodra. Shaban Aga, their eponymous ancestor was the son-in-law of Sulejman Pasha Bushati, sanjakbey of Shkodra. He was sent in Gusinje as the commander of the fortress around 1690. The Shabanagaj family owned large estates in Berane. Ali Pasha of Gusinje, commander of the League of Prizren was a Shabanagaj and Jashar Rexhepagiq, pedagogue in Kosovo, was a Rexhepagaj. Many other families in Plav also trace their origin to different historical tribes who migrated to the area. The Ferri (Ferović), Kërcaj (Krcić), Kuçi (Kuč), Medunaj (Medunanjin), Shabaj (Šabović), Toskaj (Toskić) descend from Kuči/Kuçi; the Canaj (Canović), Musajt (Musić), Rekaj (Reković), Mekuli (Mekulović) and Rugova (Rugovac) descend from Kelmendi; the Shahmanaj (Šahmanović) from Triesh; the Begani (Beganović), Kasumi (Kasumović), Shalunaj (Šaljunović) from Shala; Basha (Bašić) and Hoxhaj (Hodžić) from Berisha; the Kastrat and Hot families from Kastrati and Hoti respectively.

In 1675 Evliya Çelebi who visited Plav during this time, described it as a "lively Albanian town".

In his 1838 expedition records, Ami Boué described Plav as "an Albanian village of about a hundred houses," noting that it featured "a casaba, or the residence of an Ayan, surrounded by a wall with loopholes."

In 1878, following the Treaty of Berlin, the city of Plav was ceded to Montenegro by the Ottoman Empire which inflicted tensions in the region due to the presence of Albanians. Soon after however, armed resistance by the forces of the League of Prizren and their victory against Montenegrin troops at the Battle of Novšiće (1879) prevented the implementation. The Ottomans had to cede Ulcinj to Montenegro after pressure from the Great Powers in 1881. Plav only became part of Montenegro after the First Balkan War in 1912.

The entry of the Montenegrin army in 1912-13 and the Yugoslav army after 1919 in Plav-Gusinje was accompanied by repressive policies against the local population. The Montenegrin army captured the region and entered Plav on 19 and 20 October. Its entry was followed by a period of harsh military administration which until March 1913 had caused up to more than 1,800 killings of mostly local Muslim Albanians and 12,000 forced conversions to Christian Orthodoxy.

In 1919, an Albanian revolt, which later came to be known as the Plav rebellion rose up in the Plav, Gusinje and Rožaje districts, fighting against the inclusion of Sandžak in the Kingdom of Serbs, Croats and Slovenes. As a result, during the Serbian army's second capture of Plav, which took place in 1919, Serb forces attacked Albanian populations in Plav and Gusinje, which had appealed to the British government for protection. About 450 local civilians were killed after the uprising was quelled. These events resulted in a large influx of Albanians migrating to Albania.

== Dialect ==
Plav is almost entirely Muslim and either Slavic-speaking or Albanian-speaking. The Slavic dialect of Gusinje and Plav shows very high structural influence from Albanian. Its uniqueness in terms of language contact between Albanian and Slavic is explained by the fact that most Slavic-speakers in today's Plav are of Albanian origin, representing a case of an Albanian-speaking population shifting to a Slavic-speaking one. The dialect of Albanian that Plav speaks is northwestern Gheg at the west of Plav, and northeastern Gheg at the east of Plav.

== Sport ==
In the area of the Plav municipality there are 13 sports clubs and societies that are actively engaged in sports and competitions. Some are in the First Montenegrin league and some in the Second Montenegrin league.

Sport clubs:

- Football Club Jezero
- Football Club Gusinje
- Football Club Polimlje
- Handball Club Plav
- Chess Club Jezero
- Karate Club Jezero
- Kayak Club Plavsko Jezero
- Sport Fishing Society Plavsko Jezero
- Mountaineering Skiing Society Kofiljaca
- Skiing-mountain Society Karanfil
- Mountaineering Society Visitor
- Hunting Society Rocks Plav
- Hunting Sports Society May carnation
- Basketball Club Balkanski Ris

== Demographics ==
Plav is administrative centre of Plav Municipality, which in 2023 had a population of 9,050. The town of Plav itself has 3,717 citizens.

Town

Historical population
Year	Pop.	±%
1981	3,348	—
1991	4,073	+21.7%
2003	3,165	−22.3%
2011	3,717	+17.4%

=== Ethnicity ===
The ethnic composition of the municipality in the 2023 census was as follows: 65.64% Bosniaks, 17.08% Serbs, 9.43% Albanians, 4.11% Montenegrins, and 2.61% ethnic Muslims. A total of 1.13% of the population are part of other ethnic groups.

=== Religion ===
Religion in Plav (2023)
1. Islam (79.2%)
2. Eastern Orthodoxy (19.9%)
3. Other religions (0.95%)

Islam is the predominant religion, particularly among the Bosniak and Albanian communities, while Orthodox Christianity is also practiced, mainly by ethnic Montenegrins and Serbs.

== Notable people ==
- Jakup Ferri, Albanian rebel
- Esad Mekuli, Albanian poet and scholar.
- Miodrag Džudović, footballer
- Mirsad Huseinovic, footballer
- Mersim Beskovic, footballer
- Ekrem Jevrić, singer
- Jashar Rexhepagiq, pedagogue and member of the Academy of Sciences of Kosovo
- Radovan Zogović, writer
- Smail Tulja, convicted murderer of New Yorker Mary Beal and suspected of being the Butcher of Mons

== International relations ==
Plav is twinned with:

- Deçan, Kosovo

== See also ==
- Sandžak
- Gusinje
- FK Jezero
- Bosniaks of Montenegro
- Albanians in Montenegro

== Sources ==
- Gornje Polimlje: priroda, stanovništvo i naselja. Geografski institut Filozofskog fakulteta. 2005. ISBN 978-86-7794-000-3.
- Srpska akademija nauka i umetnosti (1985). Posebna izdanja. Vol. 566–567. p. 110.
  - Dedushaj, Rexhep (1993). Krahina e Plavë-Gucisë nëpër shekuj [The region of Plav-Gusinje throughout the centuries]. New York.
- Morrison, Kenneth (2018). Nationalism, Identity and Statehood in Post-Yugoslav Montenegro. Bloomsbury Publishing. ISBN 9781474235204.
