= Gjonbalaj =

Gjonbalaj is an Albanian surname. Variations include Đonbaljaj, Đonbal(j)ić and Đombal(j)ić. It may refer to

- Ahmet Zenel Gjonbalaj (1803–1893), Albanian commander during the Albanian Renaissance
- Dritan Gjonbalaj, Director General of the Civil Aviation Authority of Kosovo
- Hodge Gjonbalaj, producer of 2015 instrumental rock album Nazar
- Sadri Gjonbalaj (born 1966), Yugoslav-American soccer player
