= Lipica (Tutin) =

- Village (Selo)
- Location within Serbia
- Coordinates: 42°59′N 20°15′E
- Country: Serbia
- District: Raška District
- Municipality: Tutin

Population (2002)
  - Total: 82
- Time zone: UTC+1 (CET)
  - Summer (DST): UTC+2 (CEST)

Lipica is a village in the municipality of Tutin, Serbia. According to the 2002 census, the village has a population of 82 people.

== History ==
Lipica and nearby Raduša were both founded in the 18th century by two tribes from the modern borderlands of Albania-Montenegro (Malësia-Brda), ~130km southwest of Tutin. The settlers of Lipica came from the Kelmendi of Selcë and the settlers of Raduša came from Kuči. Both groups converted to Islam. Many families from Lipica today trace their origin to Kelmendi. Some families come from the Shkreli of Rugova.

Today, all villagers identify themselves as Bosniaks (2002 census).
