= Mishavin =

Traditional cheese produced in northern Albania

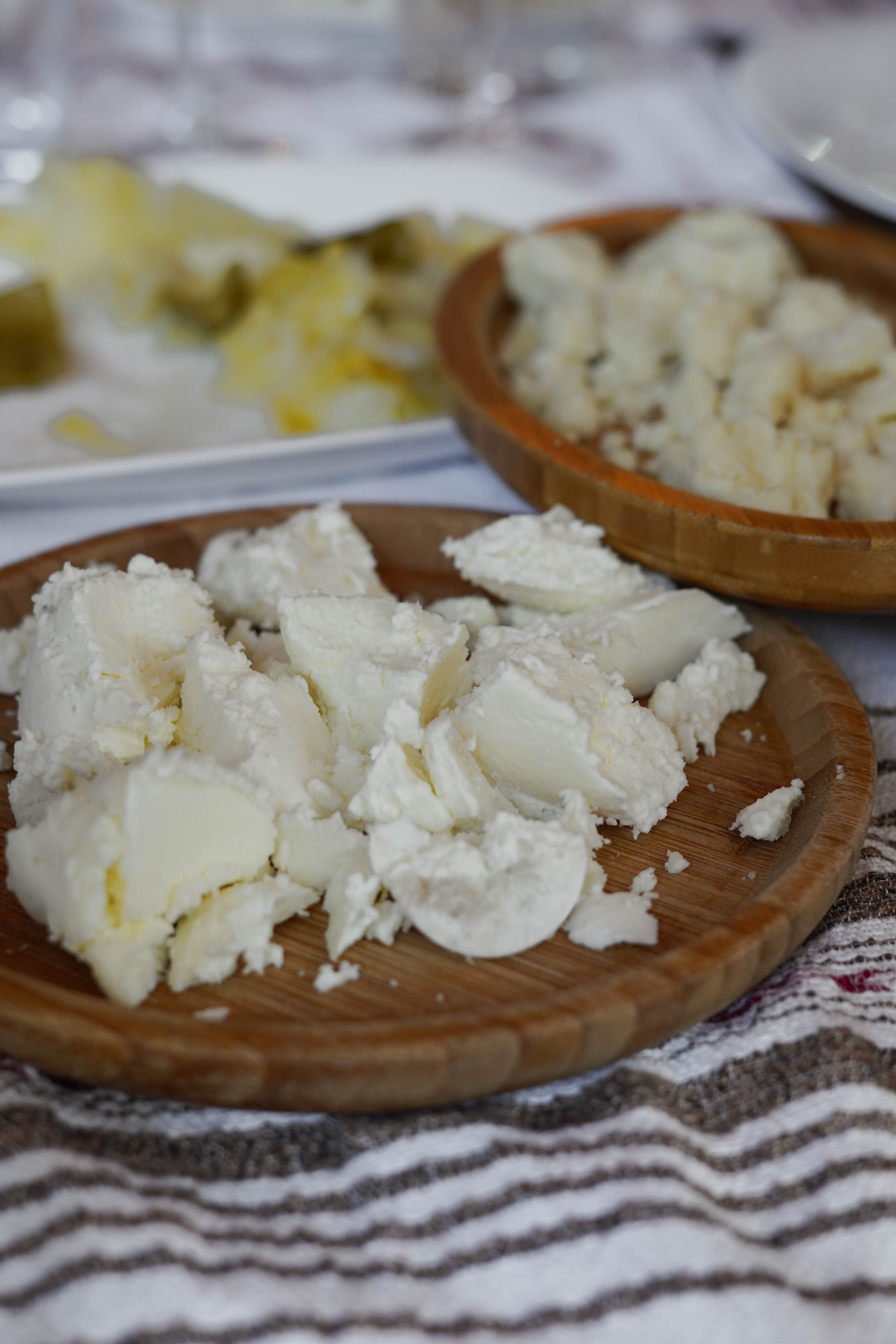
- Country of origin: Albania
- Region: Kelmend
- Source of milk: Sheep, cow
- Pasteurised: Traditionally
- Texture: Soft
- Certification: TSG: 2023

Mishavin is a traditional Albanian cheese produced in the Kelmend region of Malësi e Madhe municipality, in northern Albania. It is made seasonally from sheep’s milk, cow’s milk, or a mixture of both. The cheese is closely associated with the pastoral traditions of the Albanian Alps and is produced primarily in the villages of Selcë, Lepushë, Vukël and Vermosh.

== Origin ==
Mishavin has been produced in Kelmend for over a century and is believed to have originated even earlier among the region’s transhumant shepherd communities. Traditionally, it was prepared during the summer months when livestock grazed on alpine pastures and stored as a nutritious food for winter consumption. The cheese has long been a symbol of hospitality in northern Albania, where it is customarily served to guests as a sign of respect.

The name Mishavin is generally considered to be of Slavic origin. It is thought to derive from the word "animal hide", referring to the historical practice of maturing the cheese in animal skins before wooden containers became the standard method of aging.

In 2023, Mishavin became a Slow Food Presidium product, receiving official recognition as a Traditional Specialty Guaranteed product by Albania’s Ministry of Agriculture and Rural Development.

== Production ==
Mishavin is produced exclusively by small family farms using traditional methods that have changed little over generations. Fresh milk is coagulated and the curd is cut, lightly pressed to remove whey and dried in shaded outdoor conditions. The curd is then crumbled, salted and transferred into perforated wooden vessels, where excess moisture drains away during maturation.

The cheese is typically aged for about two months, although longer maturation produces a stronger flavor. Approximately 10 litres of cow’s milk or about 7 litres of sheep’s milk are required to produce one kilogram of cheese. Production is largely carried out by women and remains concentrated in household-scale dairies using milk from local livestock breeds.

== Characteristics ==
The cheese has a pale straw-colored interior with a coarse, crumbly texture that gradually softens as it matures. It develops a rich buttery aroma and an increasingly sharp, tangy flavor during aging. Food writers have described its flavor as robust, complex and uniquely representative of the Albanian Alps.
