= Raduša (Tutin) =

- Village (Selo)
- Location within Serbia
- Coordinates: 42°59′N 20°16′E
- Country: Serbia
- District: Raška District
- Municipality: Tutin

Population (2002)
  - Total: 90
- Time zone: UTC+1 (CET)
  - Summer (DST): UTC+2 (CEST)

Raduša (Albanian: Radusha) is a village in the municipality of Tutin, Serbia. According to the 2002 census, the village has a population of 90 people.

== History ==
Raduša and nearby Lipica were both founded in the 18th century by two tribes from the modern borderlands of Albania-Montenegro (Malësia-Brda), approximately 130 km southwest of Tutin. The settlers of Lipica came from the Kelmendi of Selcë and the settlers of Raduša came from the Kuči. Both groups later converted to Islam. Most families from Raduša today trace their origins to the Kuči tribe (hence the surname Kučević).

Today, all villagers identify themselves as Bosniaks, as reported in the 2002 census.
