= Vusanje =

Vusanje Вусање (Montenegrin) Vuthaj (Albanian)
- Town
- Location within Montenegro
- Coordinates: 42°31′46″N 19°50′25″E
- Country: Montenegro
- Region: Northern
- Municipality: Gusinje

Population (2003)
  - Total: 648
- Time zone: UTC+1 (CET)
  - Summer (DST): UTC+2 (CEST)
- Area code: +382 51
- Vehicle registration: GS
- Climate: Cfb

Vusanje (Montenegrin Cyrillic: Вусање; Albanian: Vuthaj) is a village in Gusinje Municipality, Montenegro. According to the 2003 census, the town had 648 inhabitants.

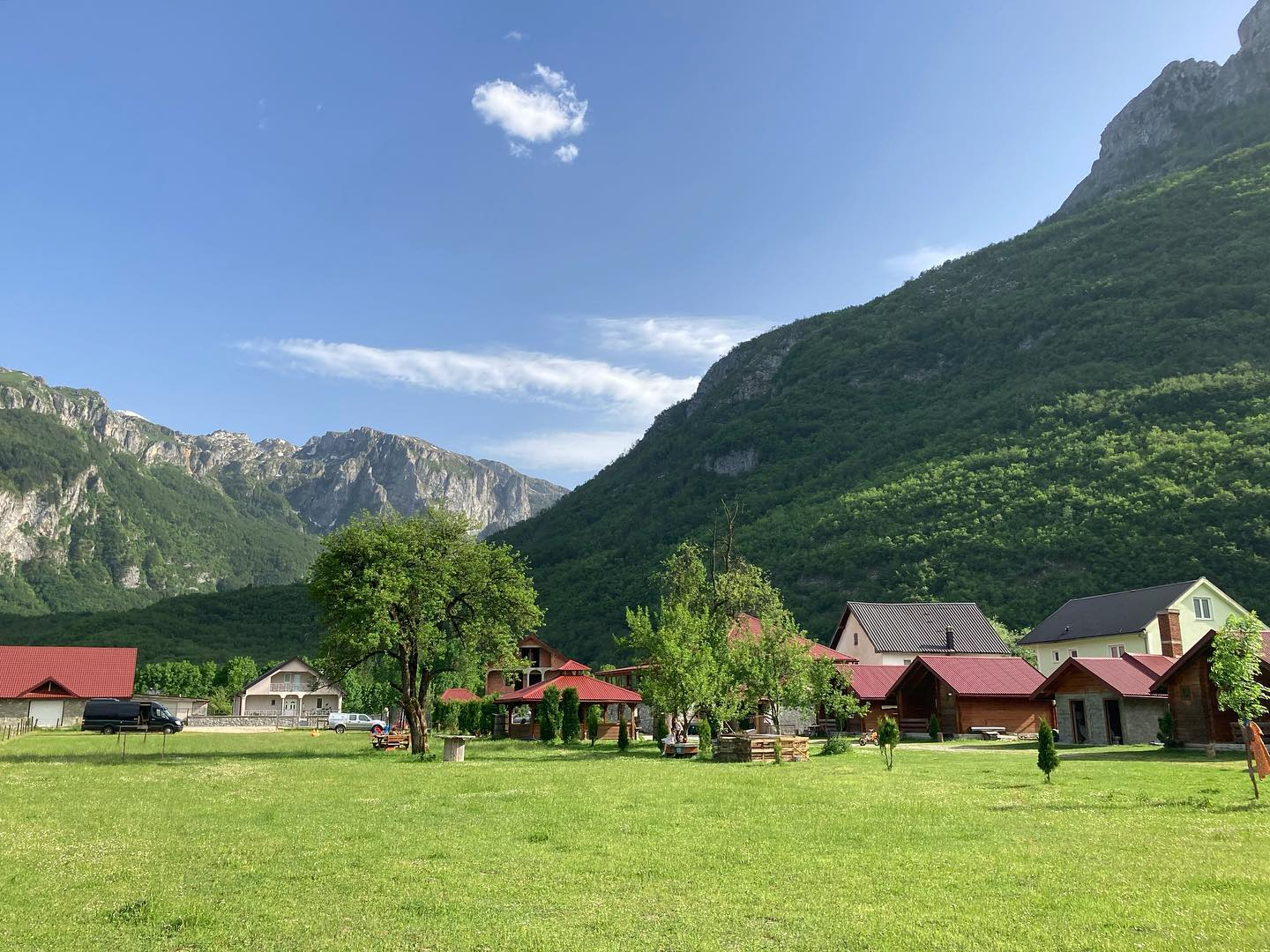
Vuthaj in 2022

== Geography ==
Vusanje is located within the Plav municipality, below the town of Gusinje. It is located in the geographical region of Prokletije mountain, in the basin of the Lim river. There is a notable waterfall Grlja.

== History ==
The village was settled by ancestors of the Kelmendi region of Albania, by Gjonbalaj and Nrel Bala family. Until 1912, it was part of Ottoman Empire. During the First Balkan War in 1912 it became part of the Kingdom of Montenegro. The village is made up of two settlements, Katundi i siper (upper village) and katundi i ulet (lower village). Also there is a hamlet called Zarunic. Post 1913, the village was subjected to repression and discrimination from the Montenegrin and Yugoslavian governments. The result was the expulsion of the 90% of the population to the United States, mostly in the New York area. The remaining population is now 100% Albanian.

There is an old cemetery in the village, called "the Catholic cemetery".

== Culture ==
The population of the village identifies as Muslim. Currently, there are two Mosques in the village (1990).

== Anthropology ==
The village is Albanian-inhabited, one of three Kelmendi settlements along with Martinovići and Novšići, in the Upper Polimlje region (1958). The majority of families hail from the nearby village Vukël in Kelmend across the border in Albania. The Albanians are native inhabitants in this region although today the vast majority of the village has been Slavicised.

=== Families ===
- Uljević (Albanian: Ulaj)
- Đonbalić (Albanian: Gjonbalaj)
- Ahmetović (Albanian: Ahmetaj)
- Vučetović (Albanian: Vuçetaj)
- Čelić (Albanian: Çelaj)
- Brunčević, Bručević (Albanian: Brunçaj, Bruçaj)
- Kukić (Albanian: Kukaj)
- Dedušević (Albanian: Dedushaj)
- Ćosić (Albanian: Qosaj)
- Selimović (Albanian: Selimaj)
- Hakanjin (Albanian: Hakaj)

During SFR Yugoslavia, families had Serbian(ized) surnames.

== Demographics ==
There is a high demographic vitality in Vusanje in relation to the other villages in the municipality. The village is inhabited exclusively by Albanians, Muslims by religion (2011 census). The Albanians of this village speak with the Gheg dialect of the Albanian language.

Historical population
Year	Pop.	±%
1948	781	—
1953	859	+10.0%
1961	935	+8.8%
1971	1,103	+18.0%
1981	1,399	+26.8%
1991	1,103	−21.2%
2003	866	−21.5%
2011	648	−25.2%

== Notable people ==
- Sadri Ahmeti, painter
- Mimoza Ahmeti, poet
- Isa Qosja, Albanian film director
- Rexhep Qosja (1936-2026), Albanian writer and literary critic
- Ahmet Zenel Gjonbalaj, rebel
- Sadri Gjonbalaj, retired Albanian-American soccer player
- Qerim Sadiku (1919-1946) Catholic saint

== Sources ==
- Barjaktarović, Mirko (1958). "O grobljima i grobovima u gornjem polimlju". Bulletin du Musée ethnographique de Beograd. Muzej: 217–219.
