= Martinovići =

Martinovići may refer to:

- Martinovići, Sisak-Moslavina County, a settlement in Glina, Croatia
- Martinovići, Gusinje, Montenegro
