= Stichelton =

Variety of Stilton cheese using unpasteurised milk

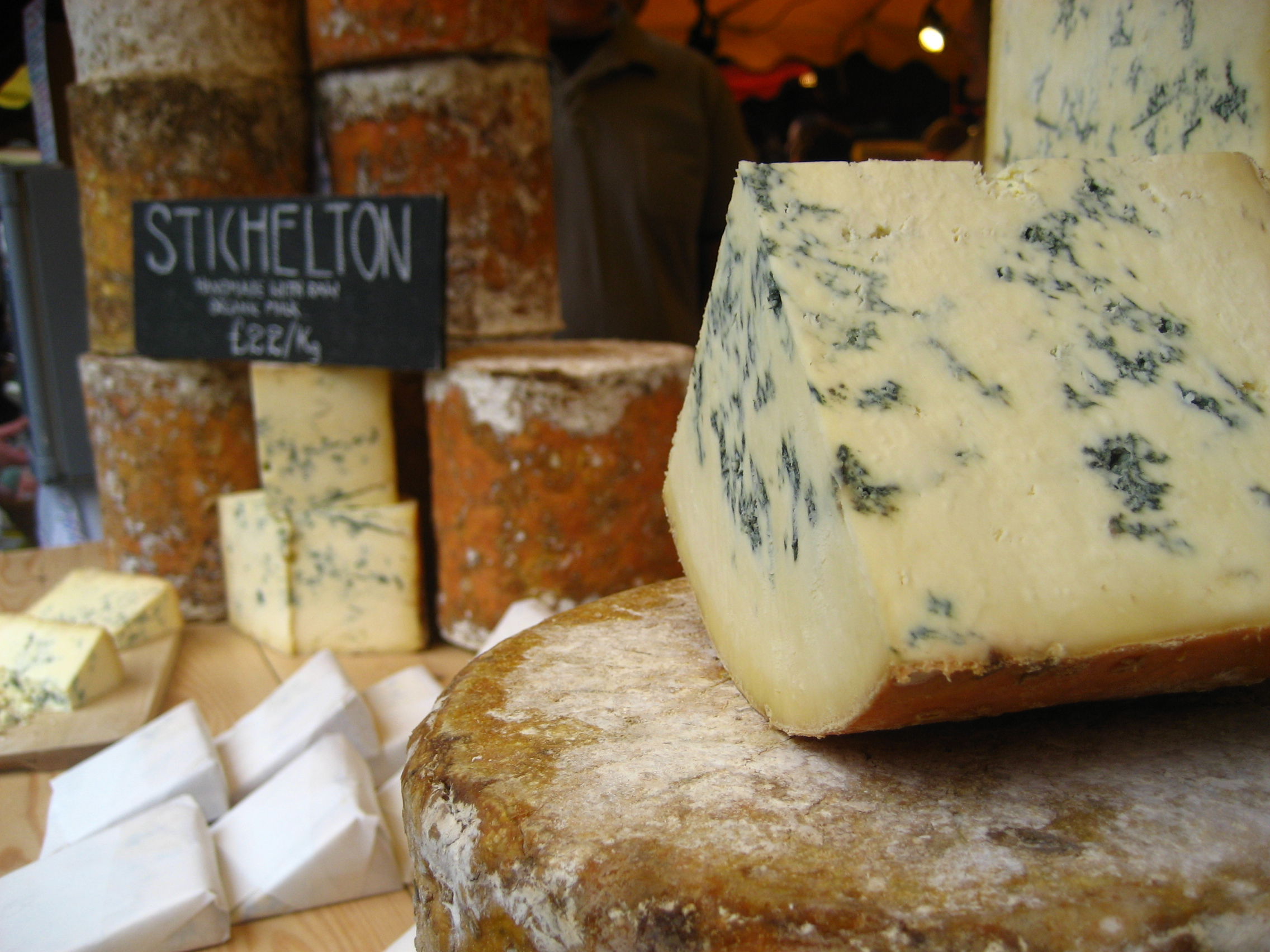
Stichelton at Borough Market

Stichelton is an English blue cheese. It is similar to Blue Stilton cheese, except that it does not use pasteurised milk or factory-produced rennet. The name comes from a form of the name of Stilton village in the 1086 Domesday Book (Stichiltone/Sticiltone), as the name Stilton cannot legally be used for the cheese.

Randolph Hodgson of Neal's Yard Dairy and American Joe Schneider produce Stichelton in small batches in a dairy at Cuckney on the northern edge of Sherwood Forest, Nottinghamshire. They use raw milk, rennet from calves' stomachs and hand-ladling and smoothing.

It was named one of the five best cheeses in the world by French chef Anne-Sophie Pic. In 2022, Dan Saladino featured it as one of three cheeses, along with Salers (France) and Mishavinë (Albania), in a book entitled, Eating to Extinction: The World's Rarest Foods and Why We Need to Save Them.

== History ==
Although most Stilton cheeses have been made with pasteurised milk for many years, until 1989 the Colston Bassett dairy did make one Stilton with unpasteurised milk. However, following an outbreak of food poisoning incorrectly linked to the dairy and subsequently revealed to be unfounded, they decided to end production of the unpasteurised cheese. In 1996, this decision was permanently enshrined when Stilton was awarded Protected Designation of Origin status by the EU, with one of the criteria being the use of pasteurised cows milk.

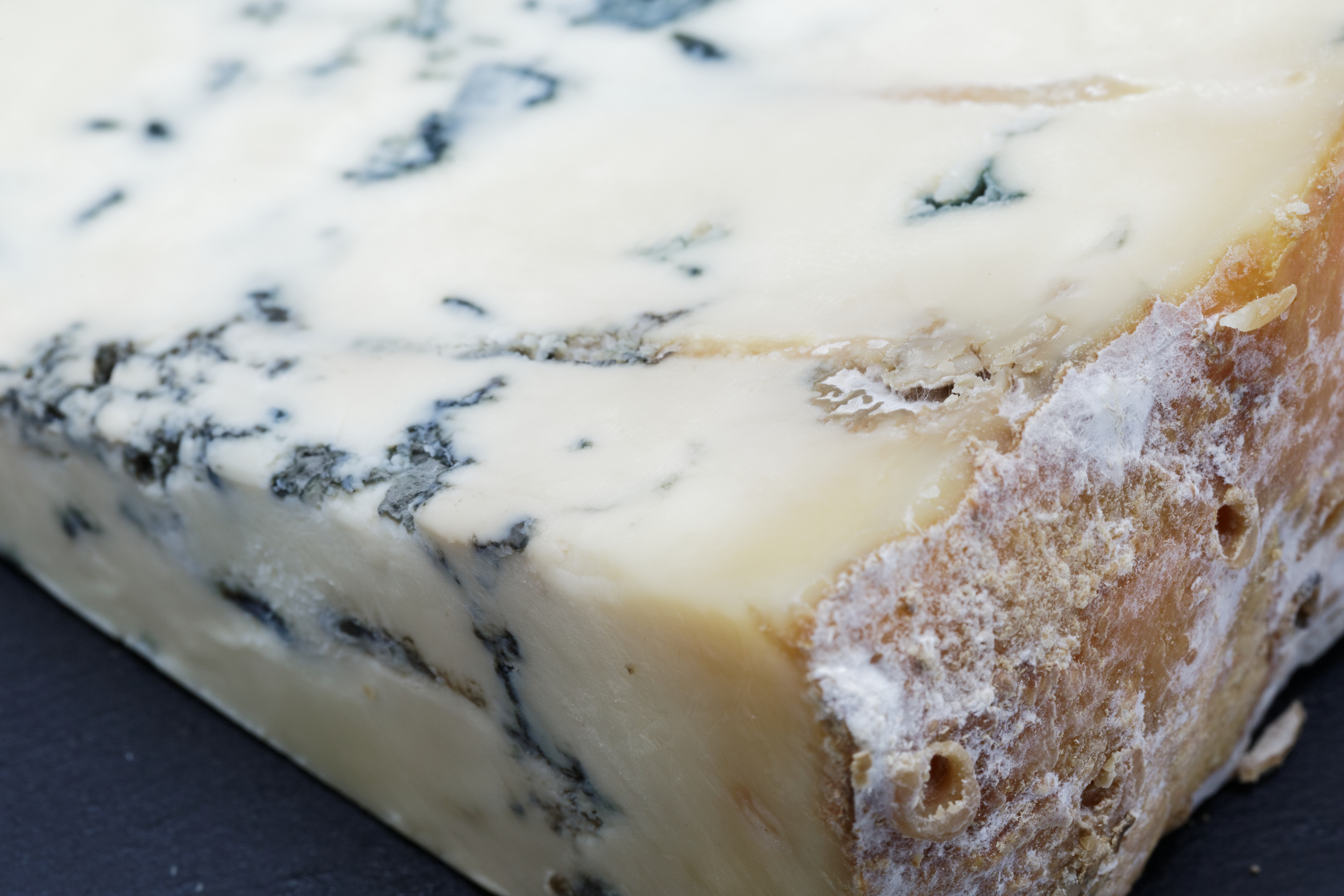
Close-up of Stichelton cheese

Stichelton is produced by a partnership including Randolph Hodgson who owns the specialist cheese retailer Neal's Yard Dairy, and Joe Schneider, an American who had been a cheesemaker in the Netherlands and the UK. In late 2004 Schneider and Hodgson discussed the possibility of recreating an unpasteurised Stilton-style cheese. They eventually found premises in which to start their dairy, on the Welbeck Abbey Estate near Worksop in Nottinghamshire.

As the name Stilton could not be used, the new cheese was named Stichelton, which its makers say was based on the original name of the village of Stilton (the spelling Stichelton appears in the 13th-century Lincoln Rolls). The first Stichelton cheese was produced in October 2006.

== Manufacture ==
Stichelton is made in a dairy, from the unpasteurised milk of Friesian-Holstein cows at Collinthwaite Farm, on the Welbeck Estate in Nottinghamshire. ForbesLife magazine described it as a "sumptuous cheese that sets a full-flavored, succulent, complex chain of sensations going in your mouth: fruity and salty, buttery, and earthy, sharp and creamy. Robin Hood never had it so good."

The starter culture for the cheese is known as MT36, the original culture used in the pre-1989 unpasteurised Stiltons, and is different from the culture that is used in modern pasteurised ones. A sample of MT36 was obtained from the original producer by Hodgson's colleague, and subsequently kept alive for fifteen years until the start of Stichelton production.

== See also ==
- List of British cheeses
