= Nora of Kelmendi =

Legendary Albanian historical figure

Folk tale
- Name: Nora of Kelmendi
- Country: Albania

Nora of Kelmendi is a legendary folktale 17th century Albanian woman for her beauty and valor.

She is sometimes referred to as the "Helen of Albania" as her beauty also sparked a great war. She is also called the Albanian Brünhilde too, for she herself was the greatest woman warrior in the history of Albania. There are two versions of Nora's legend; both end with Nora killing the Pasha, head of the Ottoman Army, who had vowed to reduce the Highland (Albanian: Malsia, also Malcia or Maltsia as for the Gheg dialect) into ashes if Nora did not become his wife.

== Legend ==
In the tale dating back to around 1637, or possibly 1638 or 1639 according to some sources, Nora, a girl from Malësia, was abandoned at an orphanage at birth by her father, a noble warrior who desired a son to fight the Ottoman Empire. Raised as a boy by her aunt, Nora grew up to be exceptionally beautiful, likened to a Zana, a mythical mountain fairy.

Word of Nora's beauty reached the pasha of Rozafati Castle in Shkodra, of Bosnian origin, who sought to marry her under Albanian tradition. However, Nora's family refused, citing the Albanian Kanun's prohibition against marriages with non-Albanians. Unaccustomed to such refusal, the enraged pasha threatened to destroy Malësia if Nora did not marry him.

The pasha then led his army and besieged Malësia. To save her homeland, Nora devised a plan. In one version, she pretended to accept the pasha's proposal, dressed in a xhubleta, traditional North Albanian women dress, and entered his tent. There, she used a family heirloom dagger to wound him while he was distracted. She then fled and, as planned, the army of Malësia attacked the Ottomans, winning temporary victory over them. In another version, Nora led a group of 300 women in battle against the Ottomans. During the fighting, she faced the pasha in a duel, killing him. Both versions name the pasha as Vutsi Pasha from Bosnia.

== Historical events ==
Historical sources give a less folkloric version of the story, focusing more on the ongoing struggle of over a decade between the Ottomans and Clementi highlanders initially due to their collaboration with the Montenegrins, and their fame as the most stubborn between Albanian tribes, rather than the portrait of Nora or any other local heroine, though they mention that women fought as well. According to Pjetër Bogdani's Cuneus Prophetarum, there were around 500 Kelmendi attacking the Ottoman army of 12,000. François Lenormant in his Turcs et Monténégrins (Paris, 1866) mentions an Ottoman army of over 30,000 with 900 on the Clementi side, while the conflict starts in 1624 and spikes in 1638. Another description comes from Father F. Arcangelo da Salto, theologian and counsellor of Savoy and consultant of the Holy See, who mentions around 700 Clementi, and the Ottoman casualties around 4,000, published in Vita del Venerabile Padre Fr.Bonaventura da Palazzuolo Riformato, vol.II, Venice, October 1722.

== See also ==
- Yanitza Martinay
- Diva Grabovčeva

== Sources ==
- Bunjaj, Nikë (2000). Nora e Kelmendit. Botimet Toena. ISBN 99927-1-294-5. OL 4014711M.
