= 1638 Ottoman expedition against Kelmendi =

Military campaign in northern Albania

Date	February 1638
Location	Kelmendi region of Malësia; Ottoman Albania
Result	Ottoman victory

Belligerents
Ottoman Empire; Bosnia Eyalet	Kelmendi rebels

Commanders and leaders
Beylerbey of Bosnia	Knez Vuk Doda (executed); Vojvode Hotaš (executed)

Strength
16,000 men	Unknown

The 1638 Ottoman expedition against Kelmendi was an Ottoman military campaign led by the Pasha of Bosnia in northern Albania against local tribes. (Note: The name Kelmendi is often used to denote both the entire Great Highlands and the highlanders.) The expedition was launched to punish the Kelmendi tribe and their associates for their raids and brigandage, after a committee of merchants and representative of the local population went to Istanbul to petition Ottoman Sultan Murad IV to intervene.

== Background ==
According to Albanian bishop Frang Bardhi the Kelmendi tribe grew very rich by attacking and stealing merchandise from Christian merchants in Albania, Bosnia and Serbia, killing those who resisted them. In 1638, a committee of Christian merchants and local inhabitants of Novi Pazar and northern Kosovo, appealed to Sultan Murad IV for assistance against the Albanian Kelmendi tribe and their allied mountain clans, who were conducting raids and pillaging campaigns against trade routes throughout the region. The Sultan, freed from the war with Persia after the capture of Baghdad, ordered Vučo (or Doudgé) Pasha, Beylerbey (governor) of Bosnia to gather troops and march against the Kelmendi.

The Kelmendi, according to Bardhi, had 250 houses with a total population of 2,900. Mariano Bolizza (1614) considered the number of "mountaineer rebels" who were to be 5,380. It is likely that the number of armed men who fought against the Ottoman campaign in Kelmendi to have been also composed other tribes besides Kelmendi.

== Campaign ==
For the campaign the Pasha gathered a 15,000-strong army, composed of soldiers of various origins (Dalmatians, Croats, Serbs, Bulgarians, and Bosnians). After reaching Shkodër, the main city in northern Albania, the Pasha ordered the sanjabeys of Shkodra and Dukagjin to gather a thousand Albanians to join his own troops. The challenging terrain and heavy snowfall compelled the Ottomans to resort to pillaging and razing villages in search of supplies. Anticipating the Ottoman threat, local Kelmendi rebels concealed their families, cattle, and valuables in a grotto in the mountains.

== Outcome ==
According to Ottoman historian Mustafa Naima (1655–1716), and to 19th-century French historians Ernest Lavisse and François Lenormant (using Ottoman and Western sources such as Austrian historian Joseph von Hammer-Purgstall) weakened by famine and lacking ammunition, the Kelmendi leaders Knez Vuk Doda and Vojvode Hotaš were caught and beheaded, their heads were sent to the Sultan in Constantinople. Surviving members of the tribe were mostly relocated to the mountains around Pristina, some were sent as far as Serres in Macedonia and to Slavonia. Austrian historian Spiridon Gopčević writes that starved to death, the main force of the Kelmendi surrendered after the death of their leaders Vuk Doda and Vojvode Hotaš, and that the majority of the tribe was relocated to Pristina.

According to Albanian bishop Frang Bardhi (1606–1643), and to some modern Albanian scholars (using Bardhi's report as source) the Ottoman force found itself encircled and attacked after the Kelmendi under the leadership of Vuk Doda had blockaded the roads. During the confrontation a thousand Ottoman soldiers were killed, leading to the Ottoman force retreat to Bosnia.

== Sources ==
=== Books ===
- Carr, W. (1884). Montenegro. Stanhope essay.
- Elsie, Robert (2015). The Tribes of Albania: History, Society and Culture. I.B.Tauris. ISBN 978-1-78453-401-1.
- Gopčević, S. (1881). Oberalbanien und seine Liga: ethnographisch-politisch-historisch (in German). Duncker & Humblot.
- Lavisse, E.; Rambaud, A. (1895). Histoire générale du IV siècle á nos jours: Les guerres de religion, 1559–1648 (in French). A. Colin.
- Lenormant, François (1866). Turcs et Monténégrins (in French). Didier. pp. 129–131.
- Malcolm, N. (2020). Rebels, Believers, Survivors: Studies in the History of the Albanians. Oxford University Press. ISBN 978-0-19-885729-7.
- Mazzara, B. (1722). Leggendario francescano, overo istorie de Santi, Beati, Venerabili ed altri Uomini illustri (in Italian).
- Pulaha, S. (1978). Qëndresa e popullit shqiptar kundër sundimit osman nga shekulli XVI deri në fillim të shekullit XVIII: (dokumente osmane) (in Albanian). Akad. e Shkencave e RPS të Shqipërisë, Instituti i Historisë.
- Shkurtaj, Gjovalin (2013). E folmja e Kelmendit [The idiom of Kelmendi]. Artjon Shkurtaj. p. 23.
- Winnifrith, T.J. (2021). Nobody's Kingdom: A History of Northern Albania. Andrews UK Limited. ISBN 978-1-909930-96-4.

=== Journals ===
- Tetaj, Luan (2017). "KRYENGRITJET E KELMENDASEVE NË SHEKULLIN XVII". Gjurmime Albanologjike - Seria e Shkencave Historike (47). Instituti Albanologjik i Prishtinës: 85–87. ISSN 0350-6258.

=== Websites ===
- "Frang Bardhi: The Pasha of Bosnia attacks Kelmendi". Robert Elsie.
- "Kush ishte Nora e Kelmendit?". Mekuli Press. 2019-09-06.
