= Joe Chawki =

American musician and songwriter

- Born: Joseph Chawki; August 25, 1982 (age 44)
- Genres: instrumental rock, prog rock, prog metal, fusion, world, electronica
- Occupations: Musician, songwriter
- Instrument: Guitar
- Years active: 1999-present
- Website: joechawki.com

Joseph Chawki (born 25 August 1982) is an American musician and songwriter.

== Career ==
=== October Thorns ===
Chawki first gained exposure as the lead guitarist and songwriter of New York–based progressive metal band October Thorns in the late '90s. They recorded a demo EP in 2000. During their time together, they opened for bands like Nevermore and Savatage.

=== Solo ===
After October Thorns disbanded, Chawki began writing and recording solo material, exploring more electronica-inspired sounds with programmed drums and synths. Songs like "Can You Hear Us" from 2005, and "Empathy" from an unreleased EP, showcase this new direction. In 2006, he was approached by Australian guitarist Chris Brooks, who was looking for another guitarist to trade solos with on a new song he'd written. "Unruly Elements" was released as the first track on the compilation album "The Alchemists II" on January 29, 2007.

On March 31, 2015, Chawki released "Nazar", his first solo album, credited to Chawki and Hodge Gjonbalaj.

== Playing style ==
A left-handed guitarist, Chawki plays leftie guitars strung upside-down, similar to Albert King and Dick Dale. His playing shows a clear Shawn Lane influence, in addition to John McLaughlin, Allan Holdsworth, and progressive metal guitarists like John Petrucci of Dream Theater.

== Discography ==
=== Solo ===
- Nazar (2015)

=== Guest appearances ===
- The Alchemists II (2007) - Chawki performs guest solos on the Chris Brooks song "Unruly Elements"
