= Musë Prelvukaj =

Kosovar artist (born 1950)

- Born: December 25, 1950 (age 75); Martinaj
- Known for: painting, graphic design

Musë Prelvukaj is a Kosovar artist born in Martinovići, near Gusinje and Plav in what is now Montenegro, on December 25, 1950.

== Life ==
After finishing elementary school in Martinaj and Gusinje, he enrolled at the Fine Arts division of the High School of the Arts in Peć in 1971 followed by a graphic design course at the Academy of Figurative Arts in Pristina. He took a job at a trade school known as the SH.M.T. "28 Nëntori" (named after November 28, Albania's independence day) in 1973, organizing volunteer and professional activities there. In the 1990s, he began exhibiting student artwork there on national holidays, receiving peer awards for his efforts in 1996 and 2005. From 2003 to 2008, he served on a trade school development task force. He has reviewed several art textbooks for primary and sedoncary schools. As an artist in his own right, he has participated in 50 exhibitions at home and abroad, headlined three solo exhibitions, and co-authored a book. He is part of the Association of Kosovo Figurative Artists (ShAFK) and a sister Association of Figurative Artists among Albanians in Montenegro (ShAF shqiptar në Mal të Zi).

Works have been published, and have been reviewed by publications such as Rilindja, Zëri i Rinisë, Bota e Re, Fjala, Shkëndija, Bujku, Sheshi, Kosova Sot, Zëri, Koha Ditore, Bota Sot, Koha Javore, Lajm, Ekskluzive, and Kronika e Ulqinit.

Musa Prelvukaj is an active graphic designer whose work includes book covers, illustrations, tickets, packaging, etc. He has also reviewed books on fine arts by other authors.

== Group exhibitions ==
- Young ShAFK Exhibition, 1978
- Annual ShAFK Exhibition: 1978, 1979
- Drawing Biennials: 1979, 1981, 1983, 1985, 1987, 1989, 1991, 2000, 2004, 2006, 2006, 2008, 2010
- Pristina ShAF Exhibition: 1980, 1981, 1982, 1983, 1985
- Youth Salon: 1982, 1984, 1986
- Exhibition of Four Artists at ShAFK, 1983
- Academy of the Arts 10th Anniversary Exhibition, 1983
- Exhibition at the "Lake Batllava" artist colony, Podujevo, 1985
- Spring Exhibition: 1985, 1989, 1991, 1992, 1994
- Fall Exhibition: 1995, 1996, 1997, 1998, 1999, 2000, 2001, 2003, 2004, 2005, 2006
- Exhibition: Kosovar Golgotha, 1999
- Exhibition of Albanian artists, Lugano, Switzerland, 2000
- Charity Exhibition for Children Maimed and Orphaned by the Kosovo War, 2001
- Exhibition at international arts and letters conference honoring poet Fahredin Gunga's "Kepi i shpresës së mirë" ("Cape of Good Hope"), Mitrovica, 2002
- Exhibition on the 125th Anniversary of the League of Prizren, Pristina, 2003
- Exhibition on Albanians in Montenegro, traveling through Ulcinj, Tuzi, Cetinje, Shkodër, Tirana: 2003, 2004
- June Exhibition – Pristina Day: 2001, 2002, 2003, 2005, 2006
- International peace Exhibition – Paris, 2003
- "Arti dhe natyra – Landart" ("Art and Nature: Landscape Art") Exhibition, Pristina, 2003
- Albanian Culture Week in North Macedonia (Skopje and Gostivar), 2006
- "Muslim Mulliqi" Award Exhibition, Kosova National Art Gallery, Pristina, 2006.

== Dedicated exhibitions ==
- Exhibition at the Ministry of Culture Gallery – Prishtinë, 2002
- Exhibition at the Cultural Center – Prizren, 2007
- Exhibition at the National Library of Kosovo - Pristina, 2015

== Awards ==
- Graphic Design Prize, Student Exhibition, Academy of Figurative Arts, Pristina, 1975
- Drawing Prize, Youth Salon, 1982
- Special Drawing Prize, "28 Nëntori" Hall, Pristina, 1998
- Grand Prix, 15th International Drawing Biennial (Kosova National Art Gallery - SHAFK), Pristina, 2010

== Publications ==
- SHMT "28 nëntori" Prishtinë, Pristina (2006); ISBN 9951-408-12-5
- Shkolla e Mesme Teknike "28 nëntori," Pristina (2012); ISBN 978-9951-8851-0-2
