= Ahmet Zenel Gjonbalaj =

Ahmet Zenel Gjonbalaj or Ahmet Zeneli (1803–1893) was an Albanian fighter and commander during the period of the Albanian National Awakening in the 19th century who fought against the Principality of Montenegro's attempts to annex his homeland, Plav-Gusinje, alongside Ali Pasha of Gusinje and other Albanian patriots.

He was born in 1803 in the village of Vusanje (Albanian: Vuthaj) to the south of Gusinje in the Albanian Alps. He was a descendant of the Gjonbalaj brotherhood which traces its ancestry back to the figure of Gjon Bala and his sons; who themselves originated from Nikç in Kelmendi. Ahmeti's father, Zenel Mehmeti, was also a well known fighter and had served under the Ottoman forces against the French-led Morea Expedition. During the 1850s, Ahmet Zeneli was among the Albanian fighters under Ali Pasha of Gusinje tasked with defending Plav and Gusinje from outside invasions.

His son, Mal Ahmeti, fought against Montenegrin invaders in 1879-1880 and continued to fight for in the Battle of Shkodra in 1912. He died at the age of 60, while Ahmet Zeneli died peacefully in his home at the age of 90.
