= Vermosh =

- Village
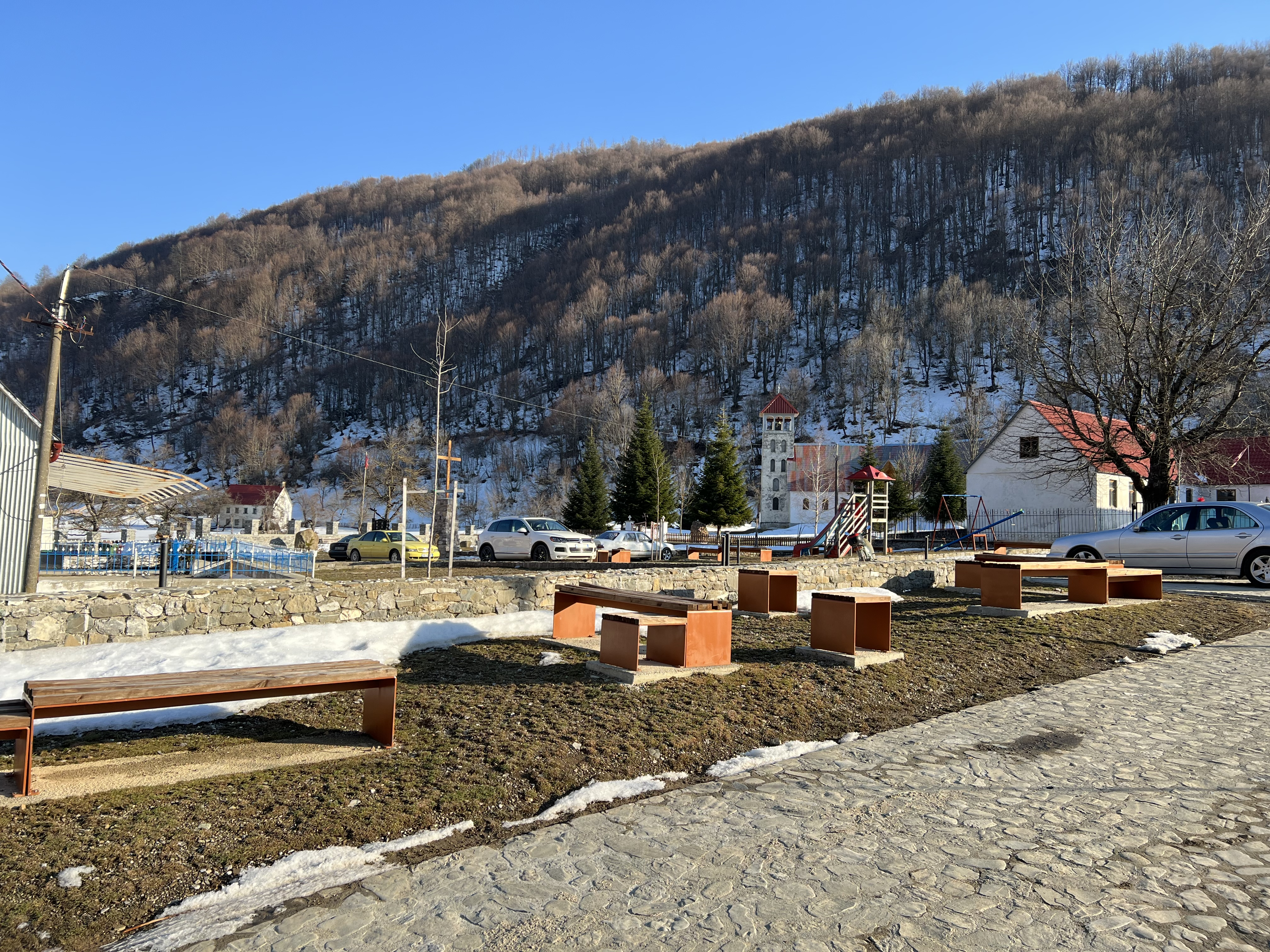
- Vermosh

- Location within Albania
- Coordinates: 42°35′34″N 19°40′50″E
- Country: Albania
- County: Shkodër
- Municipality: Malësi e Madhe
- Administrative unit: Kelmend
- Time zone: UTC+1 (CET)
  - Summer (DST): UTC+2 (CEST)

Vermosh (definite form Vermoshi) is the northernmost village of Albania, located in the former Kelmend municipality. At the 2015 local government reform it became part of the municipality Malësi e Madhe. The village lies in a valley of the Albanian Alps, along a river with the same name.

== Geography ==
Vermosh is part of the Bjeshkët e Namuna ("Accursed Mountains") or Albanian Alps, a mountain range in Northern Albania that extends to western Kosovo and Eastern Montenegro and the highest point of which, Maja Jezercë, lies 18.8 kilometers (12 miles) south of Vermosh, in the Theth and Valbona National Park.

Vermosh comprises the quarters of Pjetroja (also known as Qendra, "the center"), Velan, Bashkim ("junction", incl. the Lepushë valley), Velipojë, and Maliaj. When first explored it was called Bjeshkët e Seljanave.

Its mountain pastures are called Seferçe, Smutirogë, Lugu i Dolit, Përbicë, Greben, etc.

Vermosh is the place of the border crossing with Montenegro near Vjeternik on the road from Shkodër (95 km (59 mi) away) and Koplik to Gusinje and Plav in Montenegro.

=== The Vermosh river ===
Vermosh extends around the 100 kilometers (62 miles) of the Vermosh river (Lumi i Vermoshit in Albanian) which belong to Albania. The Vermosh river appears under the Montenegrin name of Vrmoša below the Maglič peak in the Kuči area of eastern Montenegro, just before running into Albania. It re-enters Montenegro at Vjeternik under the name of Grnčar. Receiving the stream Vruje from the right in Gusinje, it continues as the Ljuča for a few more kilometers where it empties into the Lake Plav, creating a small delta. There it flows out of the lake to the north, next to the mountain Visitor, under the name Lim for the remaining 197 kilometers (122 miles) through Montenegro, Serbia and Bosnia and Herzegovina, where it joins the Drina at the Višegrad reservoir.

== History ==
According to folklore, the three brothers Seli, Vuli and Nili founded Vermosh, and they are eponymous to the villages of Selca, Vukli and Nikci.

The border was drawn in 1878 by the Berlin Congress which gave Plav, Gusinje, Tuzi and Ulcinj to the Principality of Montenegro at the expense of the Ottoman Empire.

Part of the Malësor highlanders, the local Kelmendi mountain tribe has been known for its warring tradition, mostly against foreign occupiers. It has been traditionally Catholic.

=== Monarchist rule ===
The Principality of Albania was established in 1914. In 1925, Albania was declared a republic.

On September 13, 1914, Montenegrin troops entered Kelmendi and fought for three hours, sacked and burnt Selcë, Vukël, Tamarë, and Nikç, only Vermosh managed to save itself. A total of 90 men were executed, and the Montenegrin troops took with them 10,000 sheep, goats, and cattle.

On May 23, 1923, Yugoslavia refused to evacuate Vermosh and the locality of the Monastery of Saint Naum, despite the decision of the Delimitation Commission. The Yugoslav minister renewed the protest regarding the issue.

On July 28, 1925, the areas of the Monastery of Saint Naum and Vermosh were ceded to Yugoslavia. Zog I ceded the territories, as a friendly gesture and payment for the Yugoslav assistance to Zog's return to the throne, and in the agreement, Albania received Peshkopi and other minor concessions.

=== Communist rule ===
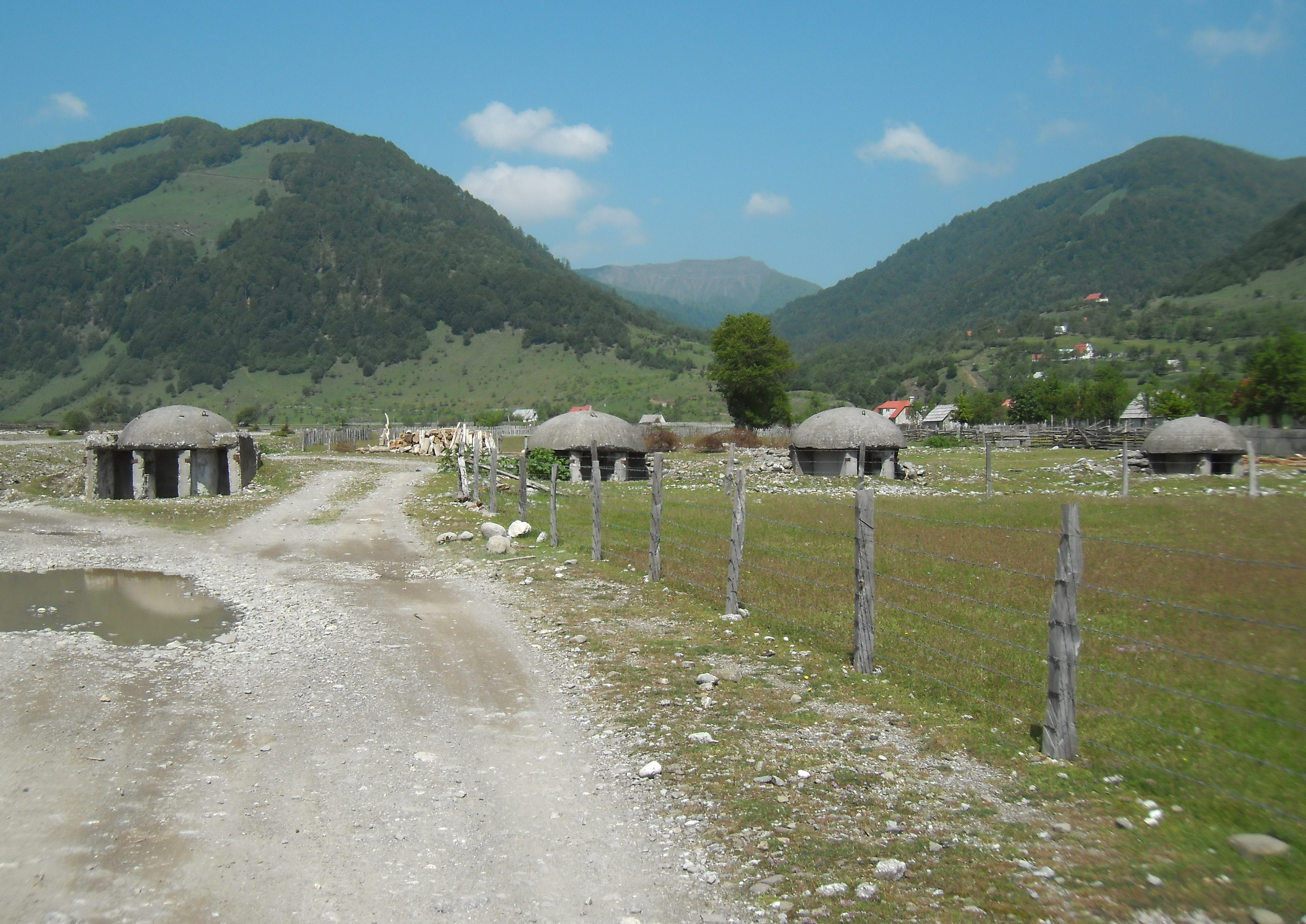
One-man-bunkers from the Hoxha era in Vermosh

After Enver Hoxha died in 1985, many people from Vermosh tried to escape the country. Most were caught by the Communists and brought to Shkodër. A noted event was the murder of 17-year-old Pëllumb Pëllumbaj, who had tried to cross the Yugoslav border through Hani i Hotit, but was caught by the Albanian border police and dragged through Shkodër tied to a truck. The event sparked a riot, in which the local government was forced to contact Ramiz Alia, and Hoxha's wife Nexhmije Hoxha. In the same year, a group of people from Bajzë attempted to cross the border in Vermosh, but were caught by the Albanian border police, which once again dragged their corpses throughout the Kelmend municipality, then to Shkodër.

== Tourism ==
Most tourists come to Vermosh for its mountain views. There are also more than 30 kinds of medicinal and endemic plants.

Popular activities in Vermosh include hiking, fishing, horseback riding, and the "Miss Bjeshka" ("Miss Mountains") pageant.

== Demographics ==
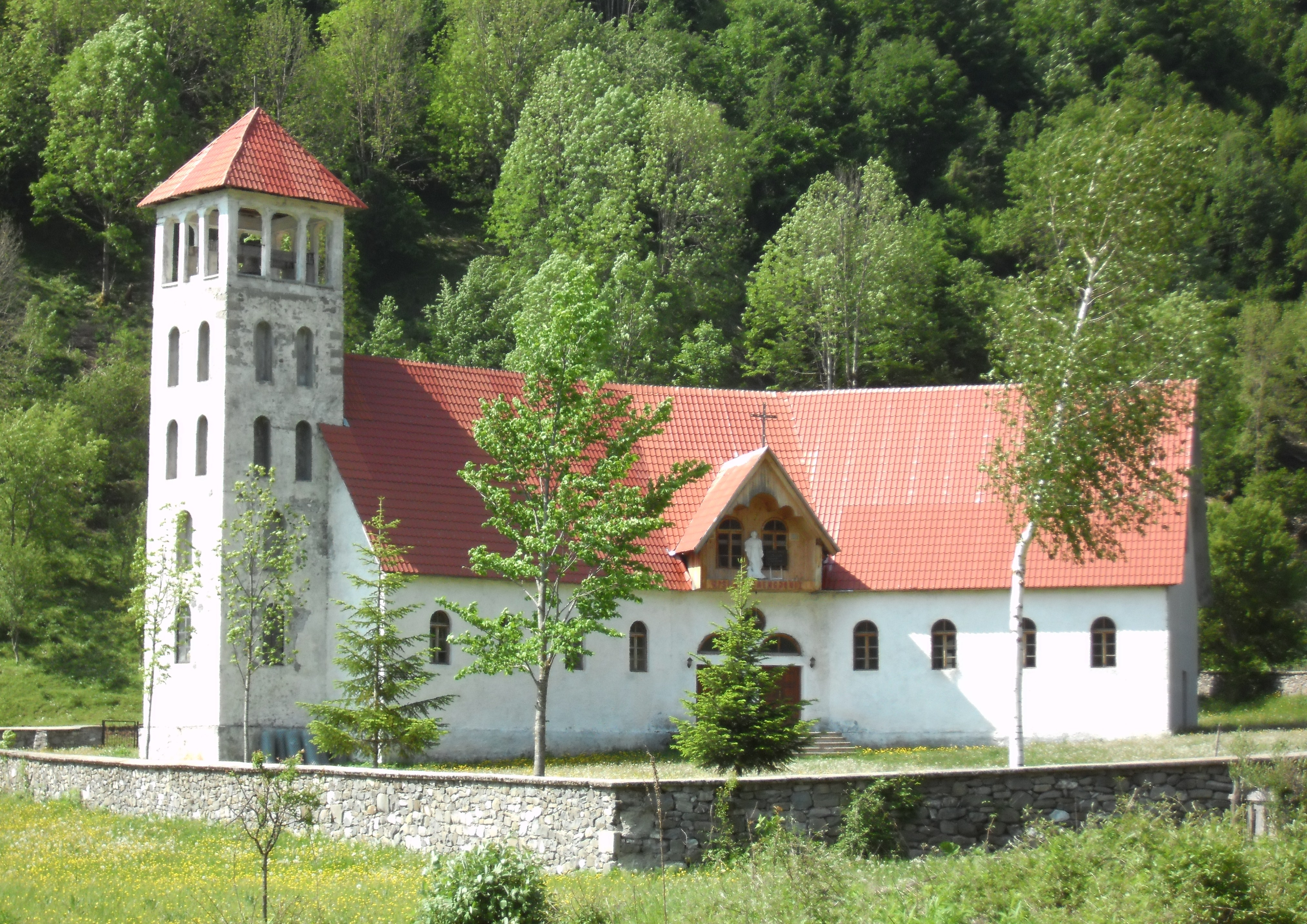
Church of Vermosh

Vermosh started being settled in the mid-19th century, first for the 4–6 months of the Spring and Summer because of the harsh winters (up to 3 feet of snow regularly).

Most of the families living there originate from Selca, 11 kilometers (6.8 miles) south of Vermosh. In the 19th century, some Muslim Albanian families had settled from Guci, and Peja.

The regional economy is based mainly on agriculture, immigrant remittances and tourism.

Families from Vermosh include: Vushaj, Beqi, Bujaj, Vukaj, Cali, Dukaj, Gjoni (Gjonaj), Hasanaj, Hysaj, Koçaj, Lekutanaj, Lelçaj, Lumaj, Maçaj, Mernaçaj, Mitaj, Nacaj, Pepaj, Peraj, Pllumaj, Preljocaj, Rexhaj, Selmanaj, Smajlaj, Shqutaj, Staka, Tinaj, Volaj, and Vuktilaj

== Notable people ==
- Prek Cali (fl. 1911–1930), Vermosh-born guerilla fighter, that fought in the Battle of Deçiq against the Ottoman Empire, and later against the Kingdom of Serbia and the communist forces under Enver Hoxha. Hoxha had him lured and killed him on Palm Sunday.
- Gjeto Gjek Vushmaçaj, also commonly referred to as Gjeto Gjeku Vushaj was a highlander in Kelmendi mountain tribe located in Vermosh who fought against the Kingdom of Serbia and has been known for warring tradition against foreign occupiers.←
- Llesh Marashi
- Fran Llesh Tinaj
- Mema Smajlaj
- Martin Hasani
- Gjon Çuni Hysaj
- Luc Mark Gjelosh Hysaj
- Zek Çuni Hysaj
- Gjelosh Çuni Hysaj
- Pjeter Gjek Hysaj
- Marash Vata Lumaj, fought the Communist regime
- Gjon Prec Rexhaj
- Dod Prek Nika Bujaj, fought the Communist regime
- Gjergj Ndou
- Ded Lulashi
- Fran Mali
- Nik Marku Rexhaj
- Ded Macaj
