= Nazar (album) =

Studio album by Joe Chawki & Hodge Gjonbalaj
- Released: 2015
- Studio: Signal To Noise in Brooklyn, New York
- Genre: Instrumental rock
- Producer: Hodge Gjonbalaj

Nazar is the first album by guitarist Joe Chawki, in collaboration with musician Hodge Gjonbalaj.

== Track listing ==
No.	Title	Length
1.	"Anything Memphis" (Chawki)	7:54
2.	"Rush" (Gjonbalaj/Chawki)	4:44
3.	"Shashlik" (Chawki)	5:19
4.	"Quietus" (Chawki)	7:04
5.	"Adrift in Time" (Gjonbalaj/Chawki)	3:19
6.	"Paradise Now" (Gjonbalaj/Chawki)	6:54
7.	"Universal Moment" (Chawki/Gjonbalaj)	3:58
8.	"Oxygene 4" (Jean Michel Jarre)	5:00
9.	"Sam" (Chawki)	4:12

== Personnel ==
- Joe Chawki – guitar
- Hodge Gjonbalaj – production, rhythm guitar "Adrift in Time"
