= Nikç =

- Village
- Location within Albania
- Coordinates: 42°28′37″N 19°41′16″E
- Country: Albania
- County: Shkodër
- Municipality: Malësi e Madhe
- Administrative unit: Kelmend
- Time zone: UTC+1 (CET)
  - Summer (DST): UTC+2 (CEST)

Nikç is a settlement in the former Kelmend municipality, Shkodër County, northern Albania. At the 2015 local government reform it became part of the municipality Malësi e Madhe.

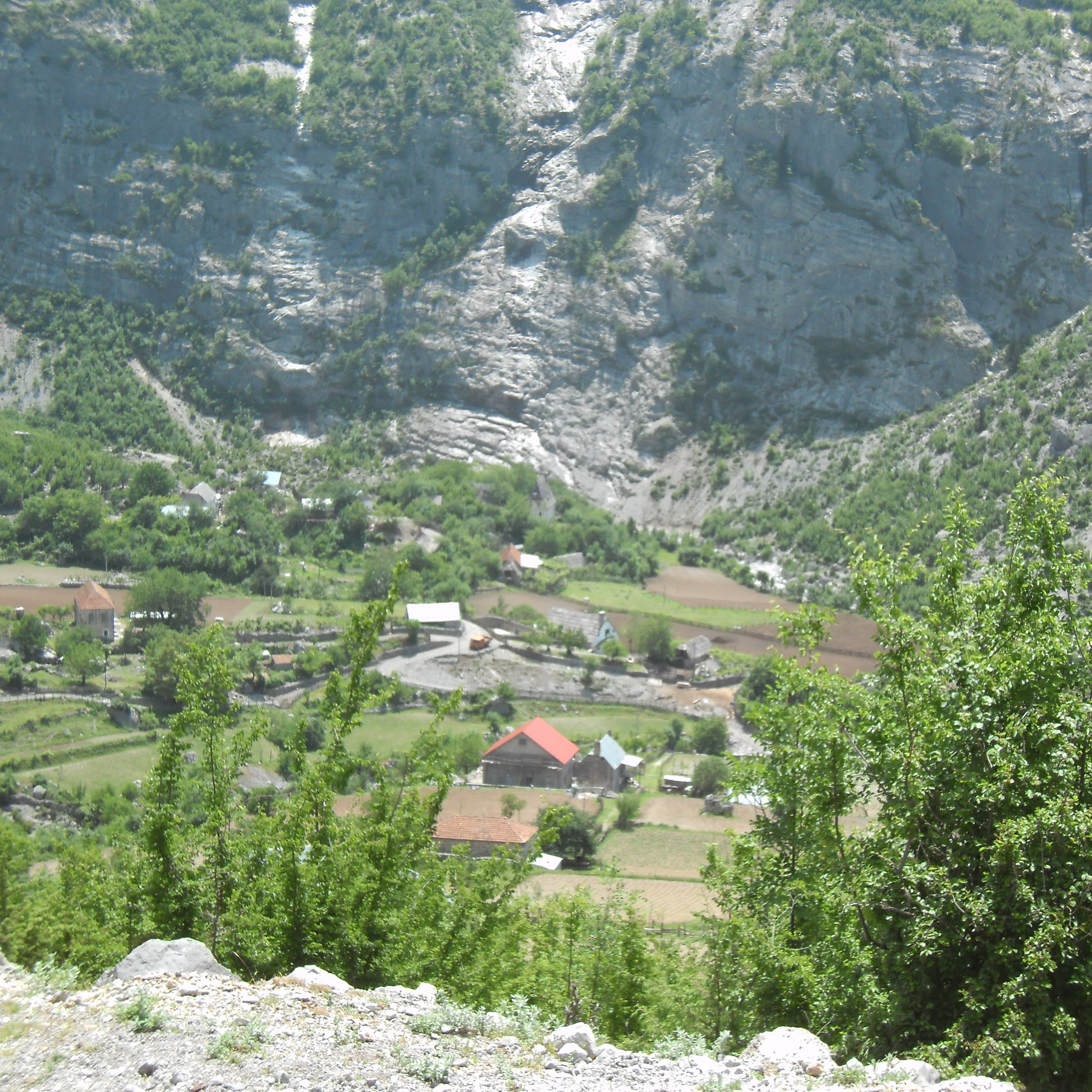
View over Nikç

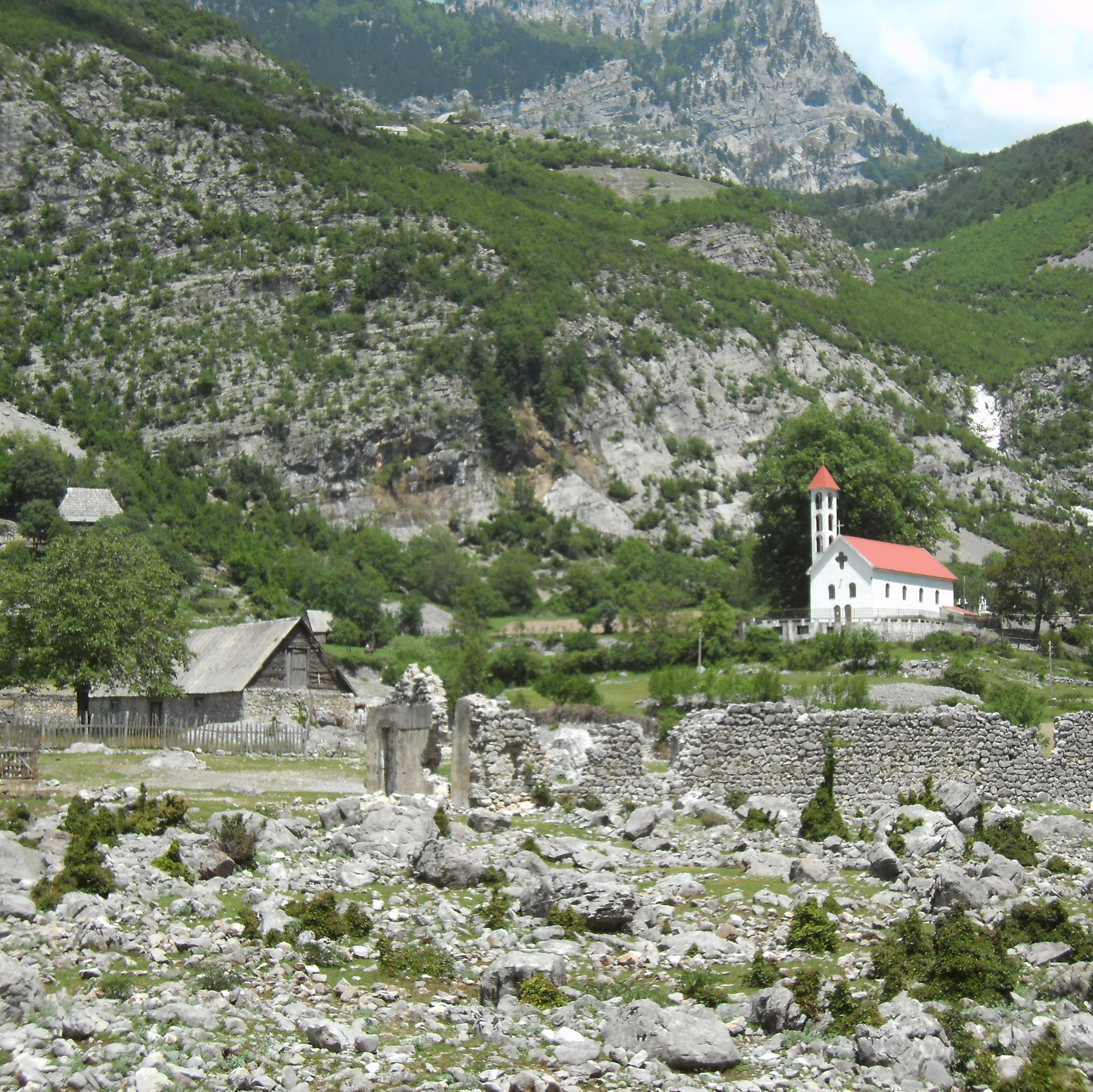
The church

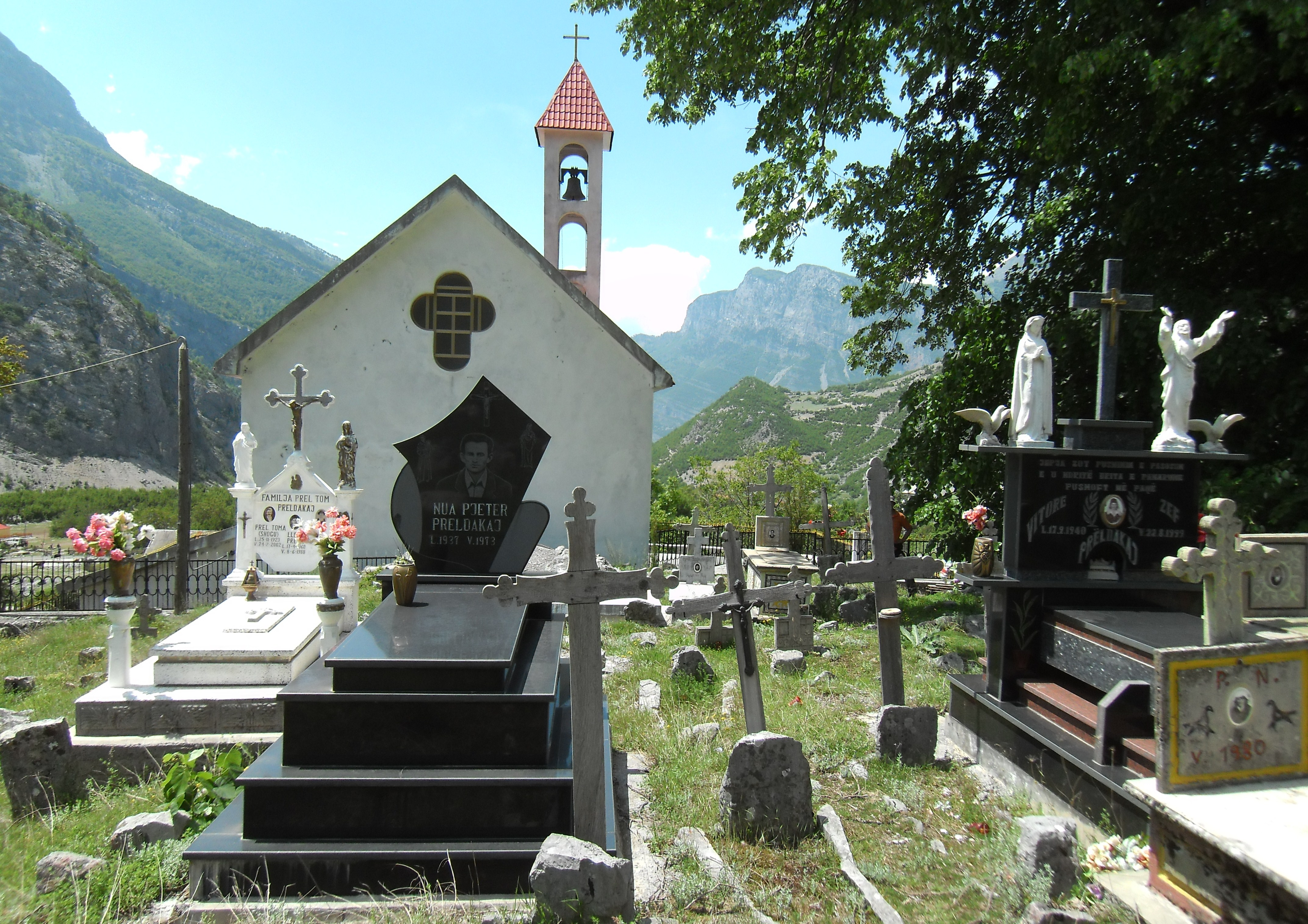
The cemetery

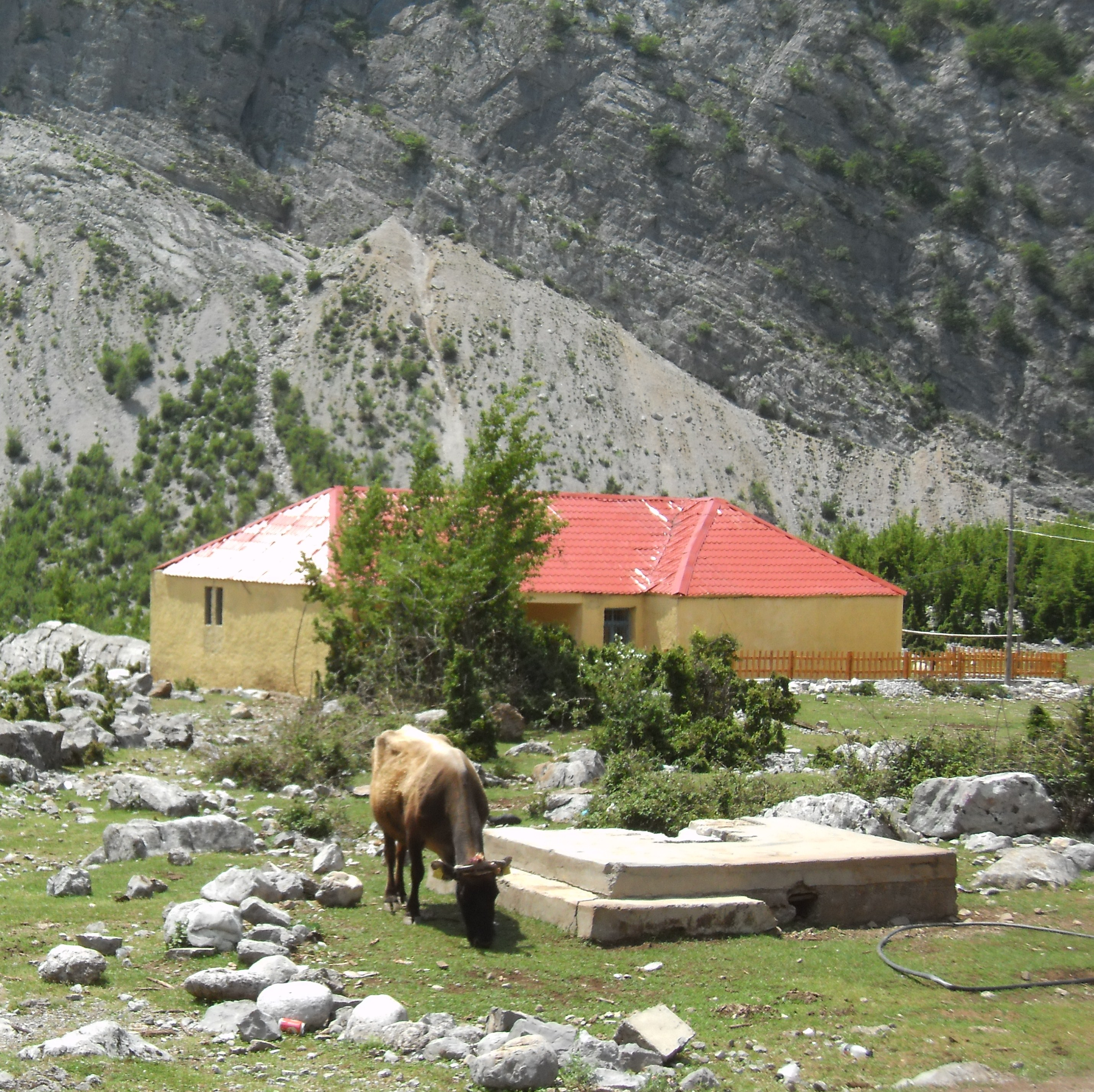
The school building
