= Sadri Gjonbalaj =

American soccer player

Personal information
- Date of birth: January 5, 1966 (age 60)
- Place of birth: Vusanje, SR Montenegro, SFR Yugoslavia
- Position: Forward

College career
Years	Team	Apps	(Gls)
1983–1986	NC State Wolfpack		

Senior career*
Years	Team	Apps	(Gls)
1987–1989	Los Angeles Lazers (indoor)	6	(0)
1988	→ Albany Capitals (loan)		
1989	New Jersey Eagles	17	(6)
1990	Washington Diplomats		
1990–1991	New York Kick (indoor)		
1991	Chicago Power (indoor)	9	(2)
1991–1992	Milwaukee Wave (indoor)	25	(18)
1993	Raleigh Flyers		
1994	New York Fever		
1994–1995	Canton Invaders (indoor)	13	(11)
1995	New York Centaurs	20	(4)

International career
1984–1985	U.S. U-20		
1986–1993	United States	5	(1)
- * Club domestic league appearances and goals

Sadri Gjonbalaj (born 1966) is an American retired football player who played professionally in the Major Indoor Soccer League, American Soccer League, American Professional Soccer League and National Professional Soccer League. He also earned five caps, scoring one goal, with the U.S. national team.

== Early life ==
Gjonbalaj was born in Vusanje, a village in SR Montenegro, SFR Yugoslavia (modern-day Montenegro). Him and his family moved to Brooklyn, New York when he was a child.

== Career ==
=== College ===
Gjonbalaj attended from the age of 17 at North Carolina State University where he played on the Wolfpack's soccer team from 1983 to 1986.

=== Professional ===
In June 1987, the Los Angeles Lazers of the Major Indoor Soccer League selected Gjonbalaj in the first round (2nd overall) of the 1987 MISL Draft. In May 1988, the Lazers loaned Gjonbalaj to the Albany Capitals of the American Soccer League. In 1989, he was with the New Jersey Eagles of the ASL. Then in 1990, he moved to the Washington Diplomats of the ASL successor league, the American Professional Soccer League. In the fall of 1990, he signed with the New York Kick of the National Professional Soccer League (NPSL). In January 1991, the Kick sold Gjonbalaj's contract to the Chicago Power. He played nine games and scored two goals as the Power won the NPSL championship. In December 1991, he signed with the Milwaukee Wave. In 1993, he played for the Raleigh Flyers of the USISL. He then moved to the New York Fever for the 1994 season. In December 1994, he returned to the NPSL when he signed with the Canton Invaders. In 1995, he was with the New York Centaurs of the A-League where he scored four goals in twenty games.

== National team ==
In 1984 and 1985, Gjonbalaj played for the United States U-20 men's national soccer team. Gjonbalaj also earned five caps with the U.S. national team. His first appearance came in a February 5, 1986 scoreless tie with Canada when he came on for Brent Goulet. His next cap did not come until a June 12, 1987 loss to South Korea. He had to wait three more years for his third cap which came in a September 14, 1991 win over Jamaica. Gjonbalaj scored the U.S. goal in the 1–0 victory. It was another two years before Gjonbalaj appeared for the U.S. again, this time on March 23, 1993, in a tie with El Salvador. His last cap came two days later on March 25, 1993.
