= Martinovići, Gusinje =

Martinovići Мартиновићи Martinaj
- Village
- Location within Montenegro
- Coordinates: 42.577367°N 19.878892°E
- Country: Montenegro
- Region: Northern
- Municipality: Gusinje

Population (2011)
  - Total: 532
- Time zone: UTC+1 (CET)
  - Summer (DST): UTC+2 (CEST)

Martinovići (Montenegrin Cyrillic: Мартиновићи; Albanian: Martinaj) is a village in the municipality of Gusinje, Montenegro.

== Anthropology ==
The village is Albanian-inhabited, being a Kelmendi settlement.

== Demographics ==
According to the 2011 census, its population was 532. The Albanians of this village speak with the Gheg dialect of the Albanian language.

Ethnicity in 2011
Ethnicity	Number	Percentage
Albanians	501	94.2%
Serbs	10	1.9%
Bosniaks	7	1.3%
other/undeclared	14	2.6%
Total	532	100%

== Notable people ==
- Liri Berisha, Albanian pediatrician
- Musë Prelvukaj, Albanian painter

== Sources ==
- Barjaktarović, Mirko (1958). "O grobljima i grobovima u gornjem polimlju". Bulletin du Musée ethnographique de Beograd. Muzej: 217–219.
