= Selcë =

- Village
- Location within Albania
- Coordinates: 42°30′17″N 19°36′16″E
- Country: Albania
- County: Shkodër
- Municipality: Malësi e Madhe
- Administrative unit: Kelmend
- Time zone: UTC+1 (CET)
  - Summer (DST): UTC+2 (CEST)

Selcë is a settlement in the former Kelmend municipality, Shkodër County, northern Albania. At the 2015 local government reform it became part of the municipality Malësi e Madhe. The terrace of Gërçe, a rocky formation between two limestone crags, is in the village.

== Church ==
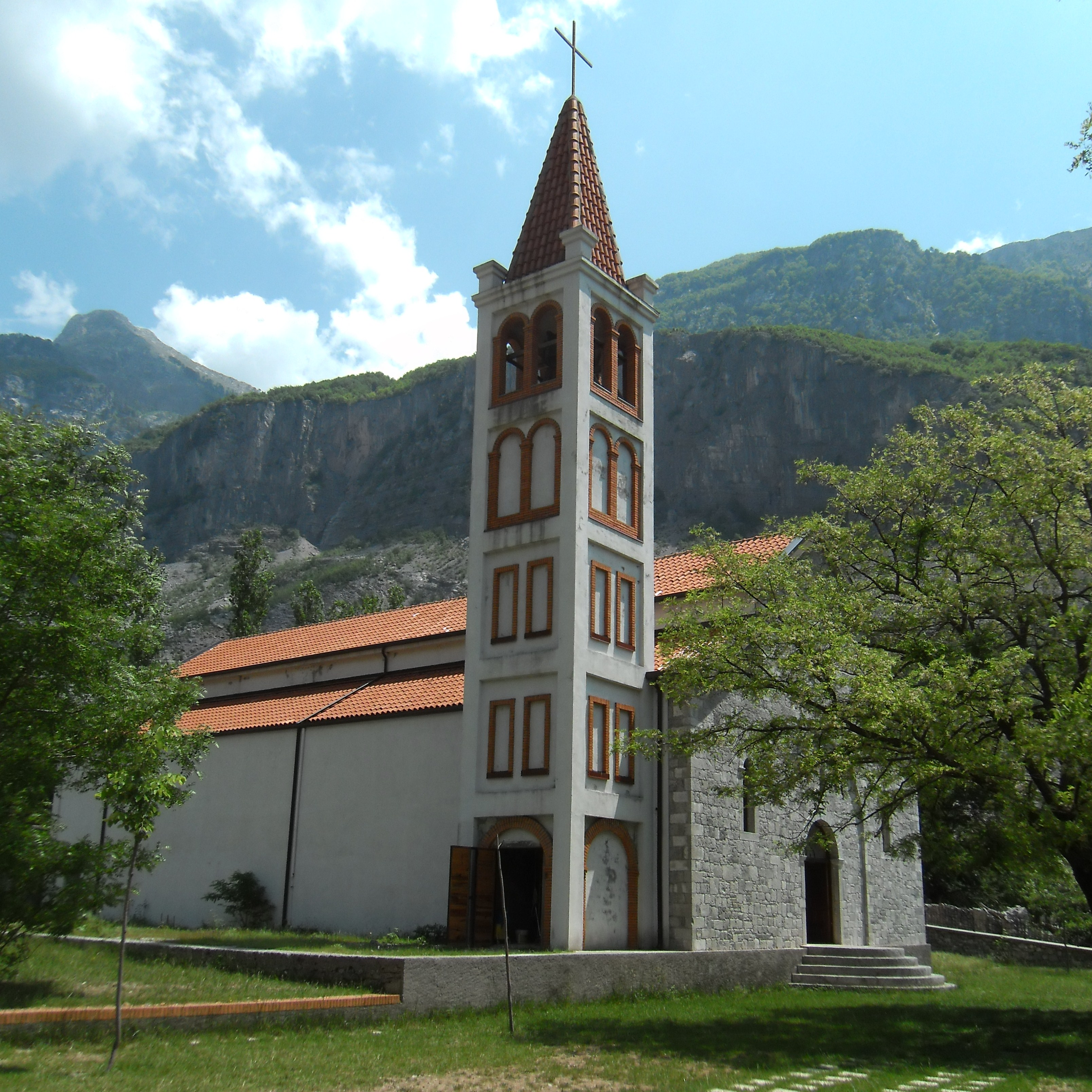
Church of Selcë

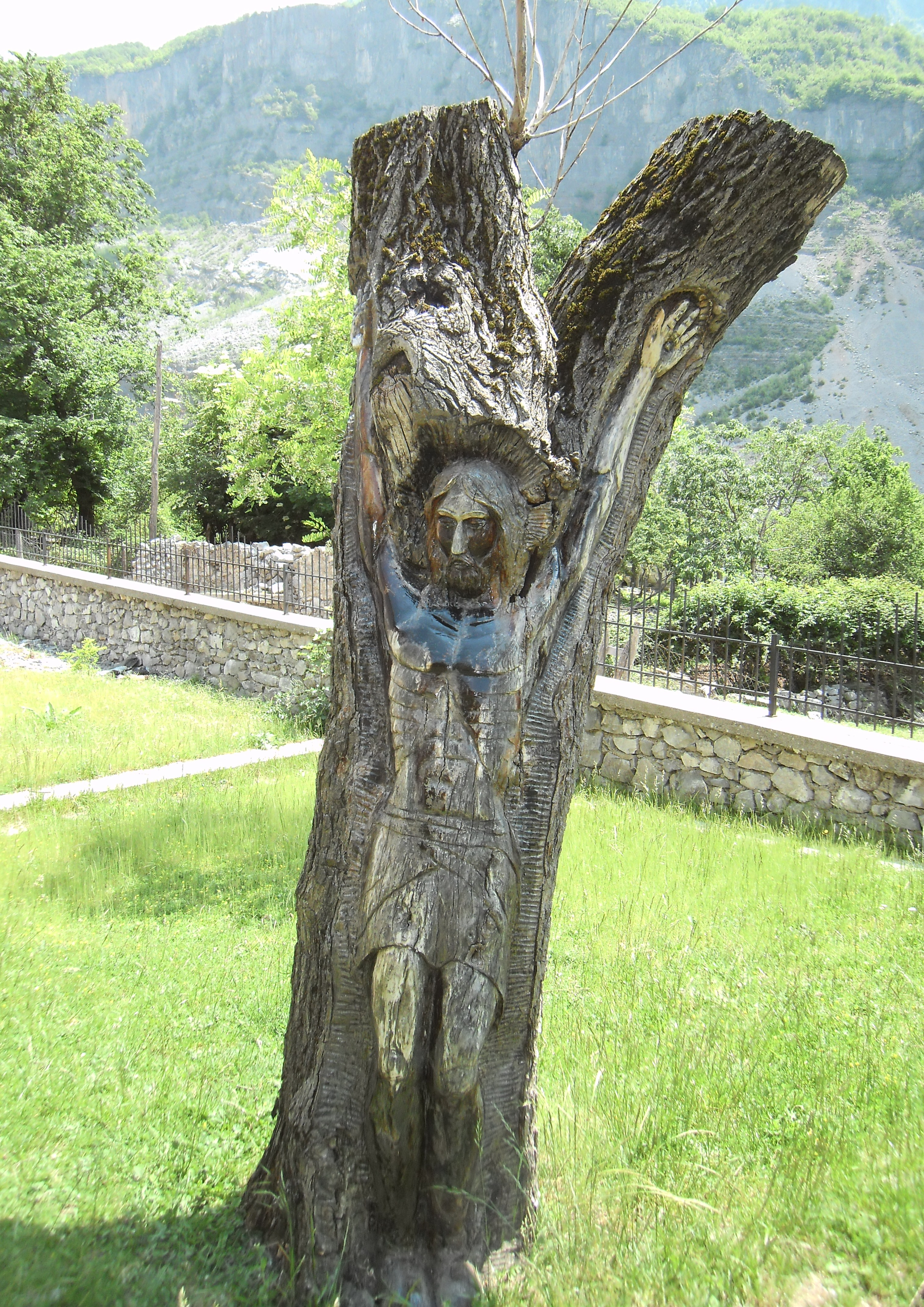
Sculpture of Christ in front of the church
