= Freedom of religion in Montenegro =

Freedom of religion in Montenegro refers to the extent to which people in Montenegro are freely able to practice their religious beliefs, taking into account both government policies and societal attitudes toward religious groups. Montenegro's laws guarantee the freedom of religion and outlaw several forms of religious discrimination, as well as establishing that there is no state religion in Montenegro. The government provides some funding to religious groups.

Montenegro has experienced less religious conflict than the other former Yugoslavian states, and has historically had a high degree of religious tolerance and diversity. There is, however, an outstanding dispute between the Serbian Orthodox Church and the Montenegrin Orthodox Church, as both churches lay claim to the country's many Orthodox religious sites and dispute each other's legitimacy.

According to a 2008 study, the government of Montenegro engages in a very small amount of discrimination against its Muslim minority and breakaway Orthodox groups present in the country. However, according to a 2017 survey conducted by the Council of Europe in cooperation with the Office of the Ombudsperson of Montenegro, 45% of respondents reported having experienced religious discrimination.

In 2023, the country was scored 3 out of 4 for religious freedom.

== Demographics ==
According to the 2011 census, approximately 72 percent of the population is Orthodox, belonging either to the Serbian Orthodox Church or the Montenegrin Orthodox Church. Local media estimate that the Serbian church accounts for 70 percent of the Orthodox population, while the Montenegrin church makes up the remaining 30 percent. The census reports 19.1 percent of the population is Muslim, 3.4 percent Roman Catholic, and 1.2 percent atheist. Additionally, 2.6 percent of respondents did not provide a response, and several other groups, including Seventh-day Adventists (registered locally as the Christian Adventist Church), Buddhists, Jehovah’s Witnesses, other Christians, and agnostics together account for less than 1 percent of the population.

According to the World Jewish Congress, there were approximately 400 to 500 Jews in the country in 2022.

There is a strong correlation between ethnicity and religion: ethnic Montenegrins and ethnic Serbs are generally associated with the Montenegrin and Serbian Orthodox churches respectively, ethnic Albanians with Islam or Catholicism, and ethnic Croats with the Catholic Church. Ethnic Bosniaks and remaining ethnic Muslims (Muslimani) are also adherents of Islam, and they live mainly along the eastern and northern borders with Albania, Kosovo, and Serbia.

== History ==
Montenegro has historically been at the crossroads of different cultural regions, and this has shaped its unique form of co-existence between Muslim and Christian populations. For much of the second half of the 20th century, Montenegro was part of Yugoslavia, which established a nominally secular state (although at times it displayed favoritism toward the Serbian Orthodox Church), and did not engage in anti-religious campaigns to the extent of other countries in the Eastern Bloc.

Despite tensions between religious groups during the Bosnian War, Montenegro remained fairly stable, mainly due its population having a historic perspective on religious tolerance and faith diversity. Following the dissolution of Yugoslavia in 1992, Montenegro was at first part of the Federal Republic of Yugoslavia, later renamed Serbia and Montenegro. It was at this point that the Montenegrin Orthodox Church began to be established, splitting from the Serbian Orthodox Church, a process which would be completed in 2000. The Serbian Church considered the establishment of the Montenegrin Church to be "non-canonical" and "political" and refused to recognize it. Since Montenegro's independence from Serbia in 2006, both churches have been supported by sections of Montenegrin society and the government, although the Serbian Church also receives support from Serbia. Disputes between the churches are ongoing, as both churches lay claim to 750 religious sites in Montenegro. According to a book published by an academic at the Norwegian University of Science and Technology, this conflict is an attempt by the Serbian Orthodox Church to suppress recognition of the Montenegrin Orthodox Church in order to further Serbian national interests.

In 2012 a protocol passed that recognizes Islam as an official religion in Montenegro, ensures that halal foods will be served at military facilities, hospitals, dormitories and all social facilities; and that Muslim women will be permitted to wear headscarves in schools and at public institutions, as well as ensuring that Muslims have the right to take Fridays off work for the Jumu'ah (Friday)-prayer.

In December 2019, the Montenegrin parliament adopted a new Law on the Freedom of Religion or Belief and the Legal Status of Religious Communities, replacing prior legislation that had been adopted in 1977 as part of Yugoslavia. The Serbian Orthodox Church accused the new legislation of being discriminatory, specifically raising concerns that it would allow the government to confiscate church property. Ensuing controversy led to public demonstrations of several tens of thousands of people, as well as disruption in parliament by ministers belonging to the Democratic Front trying to prevent the passage of the new law. Representatives of other religious groups stated some concerns with the new law, but recognized that the primary point of contention at the time only affected the Serbian Orthodox Church. The Montenegrin Orthodox Church was the only group to openly welcome the passing of the new law.

== Legal framework ==
The constitution guarantees the freedom of religion as well as the right to change one’s religion, as well as the right to privacy with respect to disclosing one's religion. The constitution states the freedom to express religious beliefs may be restricted only if required to protect the life and health of the public, peace and order, or other rights guaranteed by the constitution. It specifies there is no state religion and guarantees equality and freedom for all religious communities in religious activities and affairs.

The law forbids “the abuse of religious communities or their religious sites for political purposes.”

The constitution exempts conscientious objectors, including those objecting for religious reasons, from military service. Alternative service is not required. A 2012 law establishes that Muslim religious needs, such as halal food or the right to not work on Fridays, are provided for in the military and public institutions.

The constitution states foreign nationals fearing persecution in their home countries on the grounds of religion have the right to request asylum.

=== Legislation against the violation of religious freedom ===
The constitution permits courts to prevent propagation of religious hatred or discrimination and prohibits organizations instigating religious hatred and intolerance.

The criminal code prescribes a fine between 200 euros and 16,000 euros or up to two years’ imprisonment for restricting an individual’s freedom to exercise a religious belief or membership in a religious group, or for preventing or obstructing the performance of religious rites. The code also provides for a fine of between 600 euros and 8,000 euros or a maximum of one year in prison for coercing another person to declare his or her religious beliefs. Any government official found guilty of these crimes may receive a sentence of up to three years in prison.

The law prohibits discrimination, including on religious grounds. Offenses are punishable by a prison term of six months to five years. The Office of the Protector of Human Rights (ombudsman) is responsible for combating discrimination and human rights violations, including those against religious freedom, by government agencies. It may investigate complaints of religious discrimination and, if it finds a violation, may request remedial measures. Failure to comply with the ombudsman’s request for corrective action within a defined period is punishable by fines of 500 to 2,500 euros. Generally, government agencies implement the ombudsman’s recommendations, although often with delays. If necessary, the courts may enforce the recommendations.

=== Registration process for religious organizations ===
The law provides for the recognition of religious groups through registration with local and federal authorities, although religious groups that existed before 1977 are not obligated to register in order to obtain recognition. New religious groups must register with local police within 15 days of their establishment to receive the status of a legal entity, although there is no penalty specified for failing to do so. The police must then file this registration with the Ministry of Interior, which maintains a list of all religious organizations in the country. To register, a religious group must provide its name and organizing documents, the names of its officials, the address of the group’s headquarters, and the location(s) where religious services will be performed. Registration entitles groups to own property, hold bank accounts in their own name, and receive a tax exemption for donations and sales of goods or services directly related to their religious activities; however, lack of registration or recognition does not affect a group’s ability to conduct religious activities. An unregistered religious community may register as another type of organization in order to open a bank account, but may not receive the tax exemptions granted to registered religious groups.

As of 2017 are 21 recognized religious groups in the country: the Serbian Orthodox Church, Montenegrin Orthodox Church, Islamic Community of Montenegro, Roman Catholic Church, Church of Christ's Gospel, Catholic Mission Tuzi, Christian Adventist Church, Evangelistic Church, Army Order of Hospitable Believers of Saint Lazar of Jerusalem for Montenegro, Franciscan Mission for Malesija, Biblical Christian Community, Baháʼí Faith, Montenegrin Community, The Church of Jesus Christ of Latter-day Saints, Jehovah’s Witnesses, Montenegrin Catholic Church, Montenegrin Protestant Church, Montenegrin Demochristian Church, and Montenegrin Adventist Church, as well as the Buddhist and Jewish communities. All these groups are registered, except for the Serbian Orthodox Church, which has not applied to register.

==== Coordination between religious groups and the government ====
The government has agreements with the Islamic and Jewish Communities and the Holy See further defining the legal status of the respective groups and regulating their relationship with the state. In the agreement with the Holy See, the government recognizes Catholic canon law as the Church’s legal framework and outlines the Church’s property rights. The agreements with the Islamic and Jewish Communities have similar provisions. The agreements establish commissions between each of the three religious communities and the government. There are no similar agreements with other recognized religious groups.

The Directorate for Relations with Religious Communities within the Ministry of Human and Minority Rights (MHMR) regulates relations between state agencies and religious groups, and is charged with protecting the free exercise of religion and advancing interfaith cooperation and understanding. The MHMR provides some funds to religious communities and is in charge of communication between the government and the religious communities. The ministry is also in charge of drafting new legislation defining the status and rights of religious organizations.

=== Education ===
By law, religion may not be taught in public primary or secondary schools. The Islamic community operates one private madrassa at the secondary school level, and the SOC operates one secondary school, both of which follow the state curriculum in nonreligious matters.

== Government practices ==
The Ministry of Human and Minority Rights provides funding to some religious groups, which they can use to maintain religious shrines, for education or cultural projects, or to pay for social and medical insurance for clergy. Both registered and unregistered religious communities are eligible to apply for this funding. For the first nine months of 2017, the Montenegrin Orthodox Church received 49,015 euros, the Islamic Community of Montenegro 52,888 euros, the Serbian Orthodox Church 30,183 euros, the Jewish community 10,000 euros, and the Catholic Church 4,000 euros. Recognized religious communities also continued to receive in-kind assistance, such as property on which to build houses of worship, from other government ministries and from local governments.

As of 2022, government has not provided restitution of religious properties expropriated by the former government of Yugoslavia. Government officials have said that a draft law on religious communities would address restitution issues.

In 2019, the government adopted the Law on Freedom of Religion or Belief and the Legal Status of Religious Communities; the Serbian Orthodox Church said that its wording could allow the transfer of SOC buildings and other property to the state and there were street protests against this law. By the end of the year, the government removed property rights provision from the law.

According to a 2008 study, Montenegro engages in a very small amount of discrimination against its Muslim minority and breakaway Orthodox groups present in the country. This level of discrimination was consistent with a previous analysis from 1990.

=== Conflict between the Serbian and Montenegrin Orthodox Churches ===
There are ongoing disputes between the Serbian and Montenegrin Orthodox Churches over control of 750 Orthodox religious sites in the country. Both groups claim to be the "true" Orthodox Church of Montenegro, and hold religious ceremonies separately. Police forces have provided security for such events. This dispute dates back to the original establishment of the Montenegrin Orthodox Church as a separate entity, a process which began in 1993 and which was completed in 2000. Since 2011, members of both churches have been barred from celebrating the transfiguration of Christ at the Church of the Transfiguration of Jesus Christ in Ivanova Korita near the historical capital of Cetinje.

== Societal attitudes ==
A survey published in March 2017 and carried out by the Council of Europe and the Office of the Ombudsperson, as part of the council’s “Support to the National Institutions in Preventing Discrimination in Montenegro” project, found increases in perceptions of religious discrimination since the previous study (2015) across all five areas surveyed (employment, education, health care, public services, and culture). Perceptions of discrimination based on religion were highest in relation to employment, where 45.7 percent of respondents reported experiencing religious discrimination, up from 38 percent in 2015. According to the survey, perception of discrimination were highest by a significant margin among Serbian Orthodox Church members, followed by Catholics, those with no religious affiliation, and Muslims.

In 2019, representatives of the Serbian Orthodox Church stated that they were barred from performing ceremonies at the Church of St. Basil of Ostrog in Martinici, Gusinje, due to protests by local residents. The town is 94% Muslim. The Serbian Orthodox Church also claimed that members of local government threatened to burn down the church if it was restored.

== See also ==
- Religion in Montenegro
- Eastern Orthodoxy in Montenegro
- History of the Jews in Montenegro
