= Višnjevo =

Višnjevo is a Serbo-Croatian toponym, derived from višnja (cherry). It may refer to:

- Višnjevo, Gacko, Bosnia and Herzegovina
- Višnjevo, Travnik, Bosnia and Herzegovina
- Višnjevo, Gusinje, Montenegro
