= Nemanja Vučković =

Serbian painter (born 1990)

- Born: January 6, 1990; Surdulica, Serbia
- Occupation: Painter
- Awards: Abstract painting
- Website: nemanjavuckovic.com

Nemanja Vučković (Serbian Cyrillic: Немања Вучковић; born 6 January 1990) is a Serbian painter.

== Life ==
Vučković was born on 6 January 1990 in Surdulica. He finished primary and secondary school in Surdulica. He graduated from the Faculty of Applied Arts, and in 2017 he became a Master of Fine Arts at the IUNP at the department in Niš. He is currently studying for a doctorate in the field of painting.

So far, he has had twenty-six independent exhibitions in the country and abroad. He has participated in over thirty group exhibitions, participated in many art colonies and symposia. His works are in the private and public collections of art lovers.

He works in large formats, and his work is based on the search for a connection between the energy of nature and human energy at the moment of creation. Nemanja's work is associated with the paintings of Fauvism and abstract expressionism, he deals with painting, drawing, graphics as well as pedagogical work.

He is a member of the ULUS since 2020. His exhibition in the Gallery of the House of Legates in Belgrade was nominated for the Political Award, in the category for the best exhibition in 2021.

His last exhibition in Belgrade, after Vienna and Salzburg, was opened by art historian, museum advisor and assistant director of the National Museum of Serbia Ivana Viatov.

He won second place for a drawing at the 6th International Drawing Biennale, "Dušan Starčević" Memorial Gallery in Smederevska Palanka.

== Solo exhibitions ==
- 2005 – Surdulica, Gallery of Cultural Center Surdulica – "Game"
- 2015 – Surdulica, Gallery of Cultural Center Surdulica - "Emotion"
- 2016 – Novi Pazar, Gallery of the International University - "Achromatic Landscapes"
- 2017 – Vranje, Gallery of the National University of Vranje - "Achromatic experience"
- 2017 – Balchik, Bulgaria, Balchik Gallery - "Achromatic experience"
- 2017 – Niš, Gallery of Contemporary Fine Art Nis, Pavilion in the Fortress, - "Inner State of Mind"
- 2017 – Niš, Cafe Galerija Paris Art Ame, - "Infinity"
- 2019 – Skopje, Macedonia, Galerija KIC salon 2, -”6. International Balkan exhibition Most"
- 2019 – Niš, The Hub, club & pub, -"Touch of mind"
- 2019 – Novi Sad, Novi Sad Cultural Center Gallery, Youth Tribune, "Inner state of mind - Night picnic"
- 2021 – Belgrade, Serbia, Gallery Kuće legata, "Secret of natural processes"6
- 2022 - Belgrade, Gallery of the Russian Center for Science and Culture "Ruski dom" - "Emotive move"5
- 2022 – Čačak, Gallery Dom kulture Čačak, "Spectrum of emotions"
- 2022 – Lazarevac, Modern Gallery Lazarevac, "With a wave of love"
- 2022 – Kotor, Montenegro, City Gallery Kotor, "Abstraktni dodir"4
- 2022 – Belgrade, Pomodoro Nuovo, "Magical World"
- 2022 – Vienna, Austria, Consulate of the Republic of Serbia in Vienna, "Free Flight"3
- 2023 – Belgrade, Sale gallery Belgrade - Virtual exhibition "Color Codes of the Self"
- 2023 – Velika Plana, Masuka Cultural Center Gallery - "The Secret of Natural Processes"
- 2023 – Salzburg, Austria, Consulate General of the Republic of Serbia in Salzburg, "Free Flight"2
- 2023 – Belgrade, Chichi&Arty Gallery, "Magical World"
- 2024 – Podgorica, Montenegro, Petar Lubarda Gallery, Serbian House, "One flag"1
- 2024 – Vranje, Serbia, National Museum of Vranje, "Eternal Flow of Sustainability"
- 2025 – Ivanjica, Serbia, House of Culture Ivanjica, "The harmony of nature"
- 2025 – Arandjelovac, Serbia, Contemporary City Gallery, Dvorana Park, "Abstract Flows"
- 2025 – Belgrade, Serbia, Museum of Applied Art, "Impulse of Nature"

== Events ==
- 2019 – Vienna, Austria, International Bazaar at the United Nations (UN) in Vienna, UN Center
- 2021 – Kotor, Montenegro, Kotor City Gallery, IV Festival of Light "Palaces will shine".
- 2023 – Vienna, Austria, Marriott Hotel, National Day of the Republic of Serbia, "Free Flight"
- 2024 – Belgrade,Serbia, Embassy of Italy, "Fashion and Sustainability"
- 2025 - Belgrade,Serbia, Museum of Applied Art, Performance "Art in Motion"
- 2026 - Belgrade,Serbia, Hotel Metropol Palace, Performance "Well-Being Experience"

== Symposia ==
- 2010
  - Plav, Montenegro, International Student Art Colony
- 2015
  - Plav, Montenegro, 39th Plav Literal and Art Symposium
- 2016
  - BalchikPomeranje, Bulgaria, 9. International Art Colony "European Horizons"
  - Niška Banja, 1st International Art Symposium
  - Plav, Montenegro, International Art Colony Plav
- 2017
  - Balchik, Bulgaria, 10. International Art Colony "European Horizons"
  - Blace, 100 years since the Toplica Uprising
- 2020
  - Belgrade, First Contemporary Art Fair, CAF, N.EON Gallery
- 2021
  - Belgrade, Second Contemporary Art Fair, CAF, Dorćol Platz
- 2022
  - Struga, North Macedonia, 7th Intentional Art Symposium Struga 2022
- 2023
  - Paraćin, Grza, Serbia, 48. Sisevački art colony
  - Belgrade, Third Contemporary Art Fair, CAF, Art Pavilion "Cveta Zuzorić"
  - Zlatibor, 14th Art Symposium "Vukadinović" - Painting Soul of the East 2023
- 2024
  - Prilep, North Macedonia, 16th International Art Colony "Marko Čepenkov - Dren 2024"

== Biennale ==
- 2010 – Tetovo, Macedonia – "International biennial – small graphics"
- 2016 – Beijing, China – "BeiJing Art Fair"
- 2017 – Vranje, Gallery of the National Museum, "Vranje Biennale of Artists 2017".
- 2019 – Vranje, Gallery of the National Museum – "7th Biennale of Vranje Artists"
- 2020 – Istanbul, Turkey, Engraving Printmaking Biennale 2020
- 2021 – Bandirma, Turkey, Online 1st International Visual Arts Biennial

== Group exhibitions ==
- 1999
  - Vranje, Serbia, National University Gallery
  - Petrovac na Mlava, Serbia, Art gallery
- 2000, 2001, 2004, 2005, 2007
  - Vranje, Serbia, National University Gallery
- 2010
  - Niš, Serbia, Exhibition of faculty works 2008 - Vranje, Serbia, Gallery of the National University
- 2015
  - Vrbas, Serbia, Art gallery of the cultural center - "Paleta mladih"
- 2016
  - Zrenjanin, Serbia, Cultural Center Zrenjanin - "Art room 30 x 30"
  - Belgrade, Serbia, Friday Night Gallery – "My Universe"
  - Leskovac, Serbia, Leskovac Cultural Center Gallery - "54th October Art Salon"
  - Shanghai, China
  - Balchik, Bulgaria, Balchik Art Gallery - "European Horizons"
  - Plav, Montenegro - "International exhibitions"
  - Leskovac, Serbia, Leskovac Cultural Center Gallery - "May 22 Art Salon"
  - Nis, Serbia, Gallery Deli
  - Niš, Serbia, Exhibition of faculty works
- 2017
  - Balchik, Bulgaria, Balchik Art Gallery - "European Horizons"
  - Leskovac, Serbia, Leskovac Cultural Center Gallery - "May 23 Art Salon"
  - Prokuplje, Serbia, Boža Ilić Gallery, Remembrance of the heroes of the Toplic Uprising
  - Sremska Mitrovica, Serbia, Srem Museum - "Art Salon 30 x 30"
  - Blace, Serbia, Cultural Center Drainac, 100 years since the Toplic Uprising
  - Pančevo, Serbia, Contemporary Art Gallery of the Cultural Center Pancevo - "Art Salon 30 x 30"
  - Belgrade, Serbia, Art Gallery 92 - "Art gallery 30 x 30"
- 2018
  - Leskovac, Serbia, Leskovac Cultural Center Gallery - "May 24th Art Gallery"
  - Novi Pazar, Serbia, UKC Gallery, University May Art Salon 2018.
- 2020
  - Niš, Contemporary Fine Art Gallery Niš, Officer's Home, "Niš Drawing" - "Svakodnevnica"
  - Belgrade, Serbia, Pavilion "Cveta Zuzorić", - New members of ULUS
- 2022
  - Struga, North Macedonia, Struga Cultural Center Gallery, 7th Intentional Art Symposium Struga 2022
- 2023
  - Paraćin, Gallery of the Cultural Center Paraćin, 48. Sisevačka Art Colony
  - Zlatibor, Gallery of the Cultural Center Zlatibor, 14th Art Symposium "Vukadinović" - The Painting Soul of the East
- 2024
  - Smederevska Palanka, "Dušan Starčević" Memorial Gallery, VI International Drawing Biennale
