= Islam in Montenegro =

Total population
- 124,668 (2023)

Regions with significant populations
- Largest concentrations in the northeastern municipalities Bijelo Polje, Petnjica, Rožaje, Gusinje and Plav and southeastern municipalities Ulcinj, Bar and Tuzi.

Religions
- Sunni Islam

Languages
- Montenegrin, Bosnian, Albanian and Roma

Islam in Europe by percentage of country population 95–100%: Azerbaijan; 90–95%: Turkey; Kosovo; 50–70%: Albania; Bosnia and Herzegovina; Kazakhstan; 30–35%: North Macedonia; 10–20%: France; Georgia; Montenegro; 5–10%: Austria; Belgium; Bulgaria; Denmark; Germany; Liechtenstein; Luxembourg; Netherlands; Russia; Sweden; Switzerland; United Kingdom; 4–5%: Serbia; 2–4%: Italy; Finland; Norway; Malta; Slovenia; Spain; Greece; Cyprus (Note: Only takes into account the Muslim population residing on land controlled by the Republic of Cyprus.); 1–2%: Croatia; Ireland; Ukraine; Andorra; < 1%: Iceland; Armenia; Belarus; Czech Republic; Estonia; Hungary; Latvia; Lithuania; Moldova; Monaco; Poland; Portugal; Romania; San Marino; Slovakia

Islam in Montenegro refers to adherents, communities and religious institutions of Islam in Montenegro. It is the second largest religion in the country, after Christianity. According to the 2011 census, Montenegro's 118,477 Muslims make up 19.11% of the total population. Montenegro's Muslims belong mostly to the Sunni branch. In 2023, Montenegro's 124,668 Muslims made up 19.99% of the total population.

== History ==
=== Ottoman-era ===
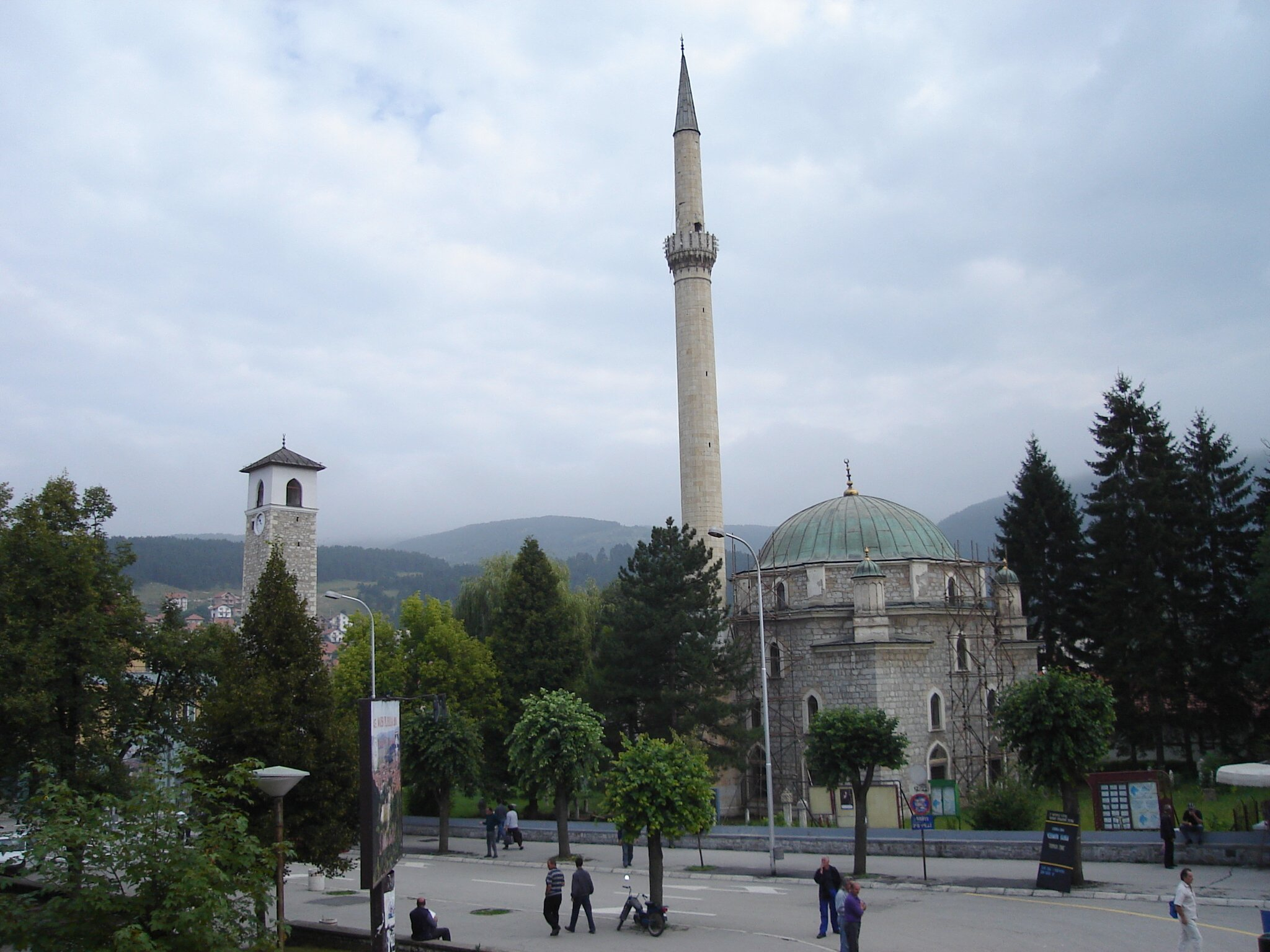
Husein-paša's Mosque in Pljevlja

In the 15th century the Montenegrin ruler Ivan Crnojević (1465–1490) was at war with the infiltrating Venetians. Unable to maintain war on both fronts, the Ottoman Empire had conquered much of Montenegro's territory and introduced Islam. Ivan's third son Staniša Crnojević was the first prominent Montenegrin of the Muslim faith.

Staniša Crnojević took up the name Skenderbeg Crnojević and ruled from his capital in Shkodër from 1513 to 1530. He is well known as one of the most prominent Muslim administrators of Slavic origin in the northern reaches of the Ottoman Empire during the reign of Sultan Selim I. Staniša Crnojević is known to have commanded an army of approximately 3000 Akıncı. He also maintained a correspondence with neighboring contemporaries, such as Gazi Husrev-beg.

=== Principality and Kingdom of Montenegro ===
In 1878, following the Treaty of Berlin, the independence of the Principality of Montenegro was recognized, while at the same time its conquest of areas home to ethnic Albanian populations recognized, increasing the country's Muslim population. Later, in 1912, as the Kingdom of Montenegro, following the First Balkan War, the Sandžak region was split between Montenegro and Serbia. This area was home to a large Bosniak population, further increasing the country's Muslim population.

Following the abolishment of slavery in the Principality of Montenegro, many Black Montenegrins converted to Islam. This happened as part of a greater cultural assimilation into the Albanian culture of Ulcinj.

=== Twenty-first century ===
The Muslims of Montenegro are mostly Bosniaks and Albanians by ethnicity, but also some are declared as ethnic Muslims and Montenegrins. The adherents of Islam in Montenegro can be mostly found in the Sandžak region in northeastern Montenegro and the municipalities of Bar, Tuzi and Ulcinj. Bosniaks have a similar ethnic background to ethnic Muslims, but differ in ideology of what ethnicity they belong to. There are 13 established Councils of the Islamic Community in Montenegro, which include Bar, Berane, Bijelo Polje, Dinoša, Gusinje, Ostros, Petnjica, Plav, Pljevlja, Rožaje, Tuzi, Ulcinj and Podgorica. Montenegro has 145 active mosques in the country.

== Demographics ==
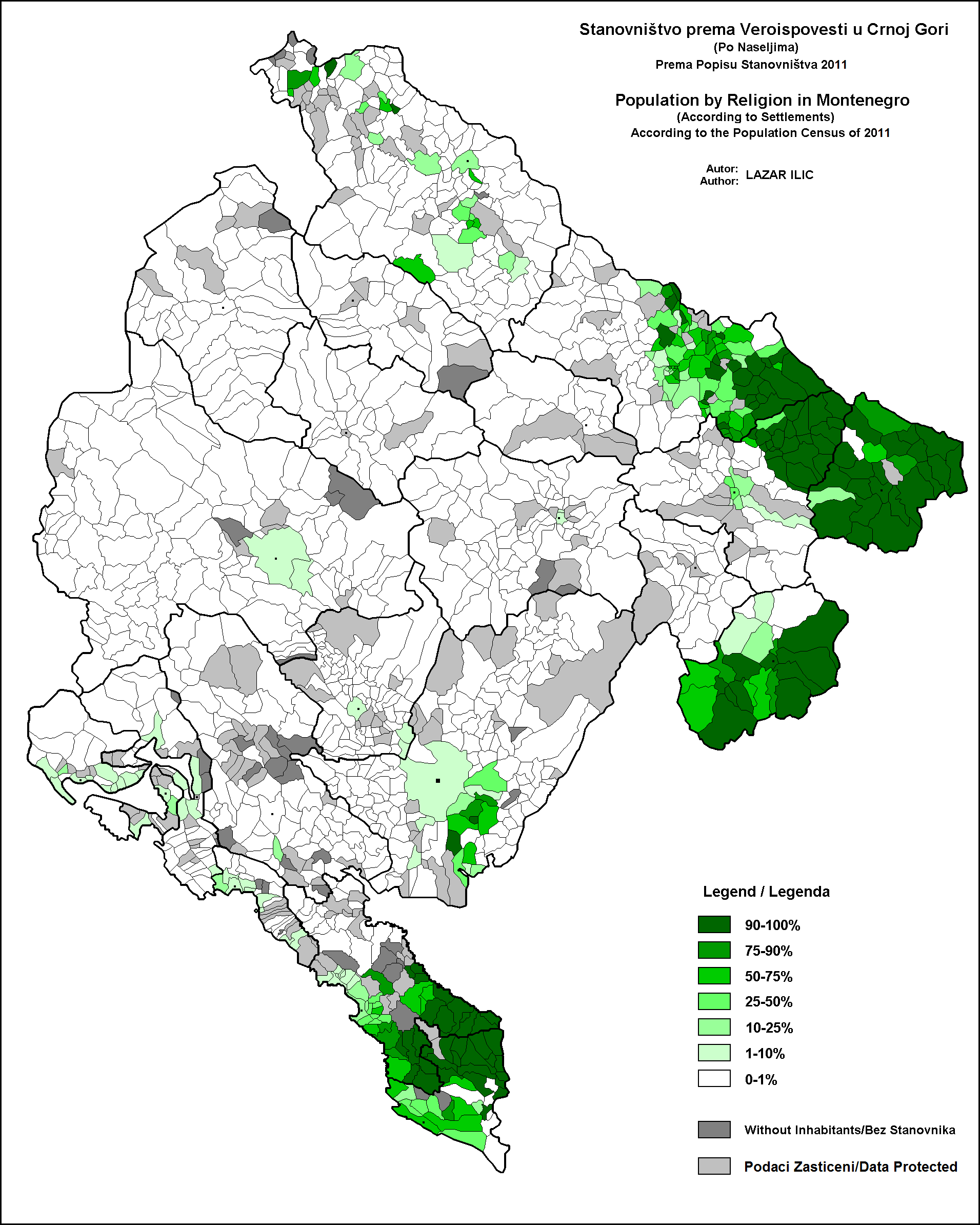
Adherents of Islam in Montenegro, according to the 2011 census

According to the 2011 census, there are 118,477 adherents of Islam in Montenegro.

The ethnic composition of Muslims (adherents of Islam) in Montenegro:

- 54,453 Bosniaks
- 22,267 Albanians
- 20,270 Muslims (distinctive ethnic group)
- 12,758 Montenegrins
- 5,034 Roma
- 2,003 Egyptians (distinctive ethnic group)
- 256 Muslims/Montenigrins
- 195 Gorani
- 172 Montenigrins/Muslims
- 169 Bosnians
- 101 Turks
- others (under 100 members per community) and ethnically undeclared

=== Geographical distribution ===
There are large regional differences in the distribution of the Muslim population. The Rožaje Municipality, for example, is almost exclusively inhabited by adherents of Islam, while there are no Muslims living in the Plužine Municipality.

Municipality	Population (2011 census)	Islam/Muslim (%)
Rožaje Municipality	22,964	94.95
Plav Municipality	13,108	76.64
Ulcinj Municipality	19,921	71.82
Bijelo Polje Municipality	46,051	46.18
Bar Municipality	42,048	30.14
Berane Municipality	33,970	27.97
Pljevlja Municipality	30,786	16.37
Podgorica Municipality	185,937	11.23
Tivat Municipality	14,031	5.10
Budva Municipality	19,218	3.40
Herceg Novi Municipality	30,864	2.01
Kotor Municipality	22,601	1.66
Danilovgrad Municipality	18,472	1.41
Nikšić Municipality	72,443	1.39
Cetinje Municipality	16,657	0.76
Šavnik Municipality	2,070	0.58
Kolašin Municipality	8,380	0.55
Mojkovac Municipality	8,622	0.29
Andrijevica Municipality	5,071	0.16
Žabljak Municipality	3,569	0.14
Plužine Municipality	3,246	0.00
Montenegro	620,029	19.11%

== Gallery ==
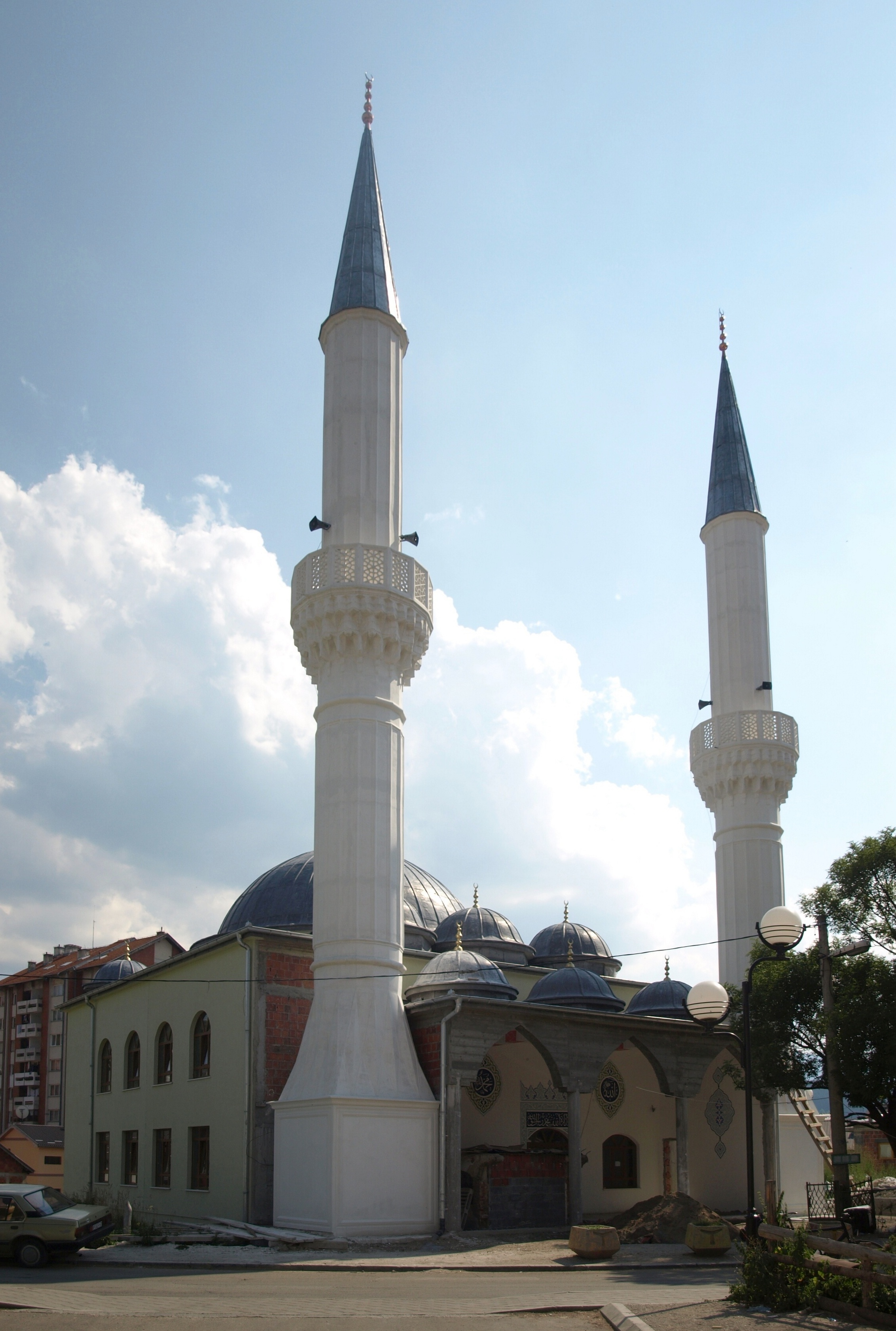
Sultan Murat II mosque in Rožaje

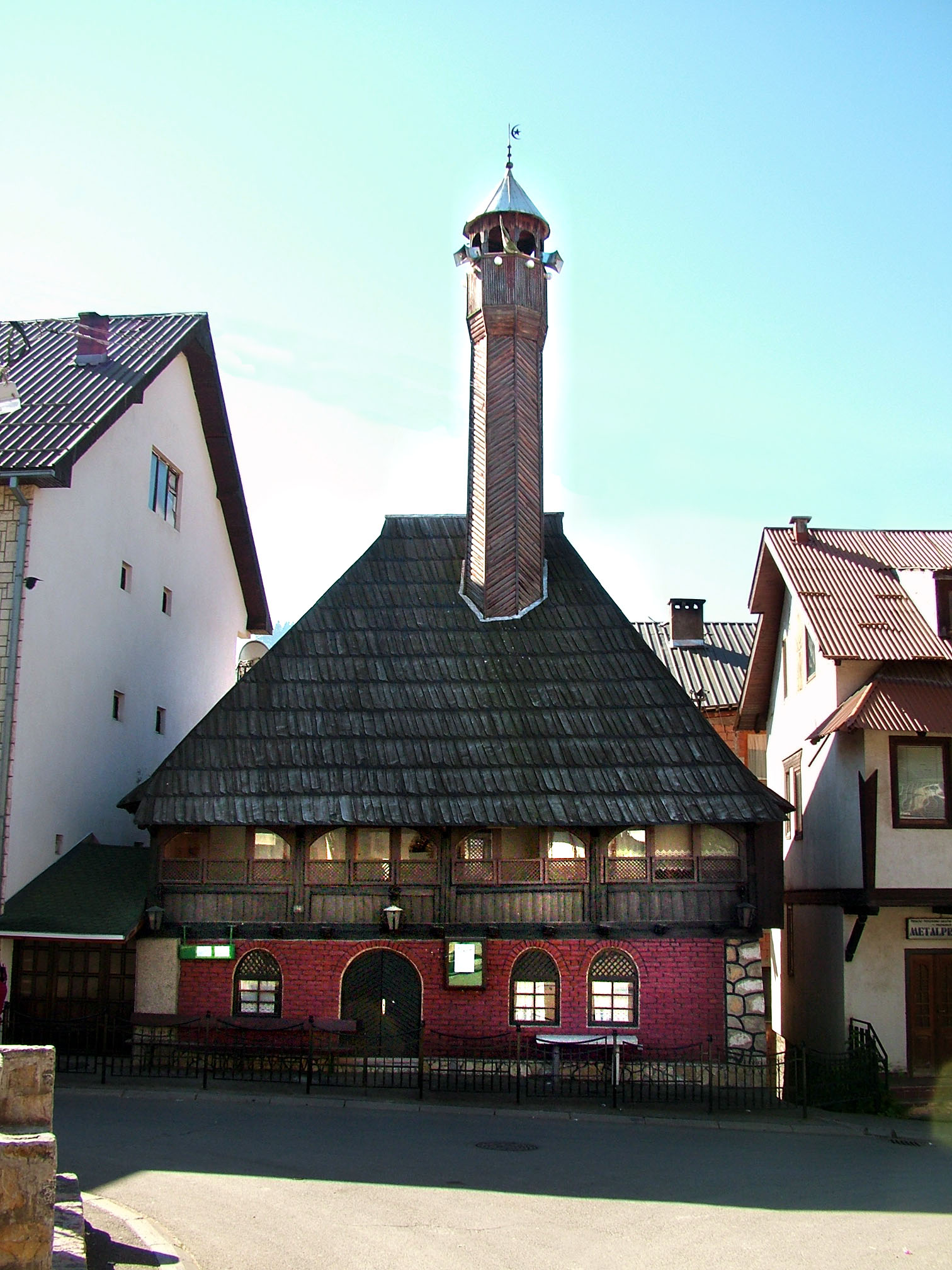
Kučanska Mosque in Rožaje

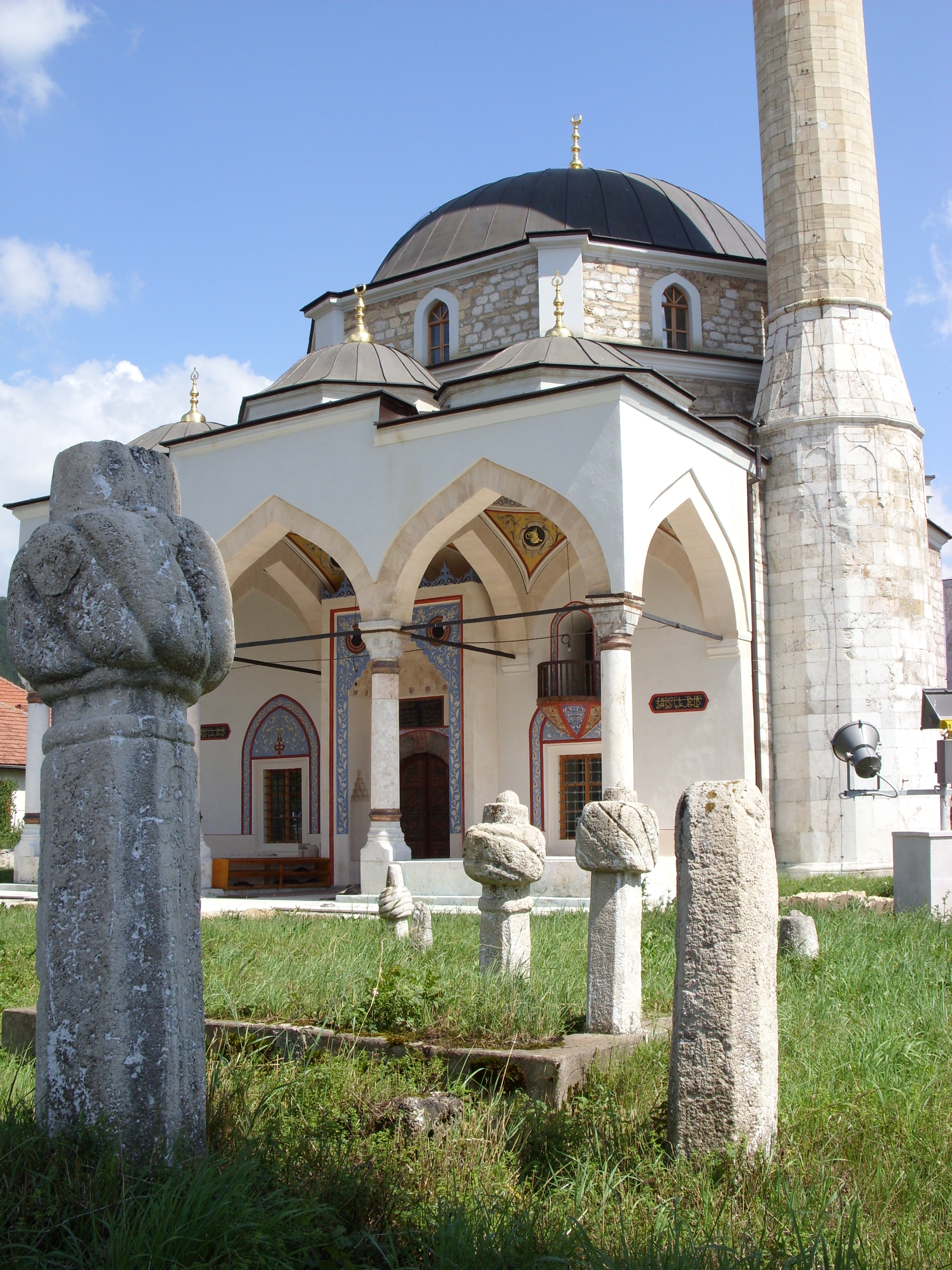
Mosque in Pljevlja

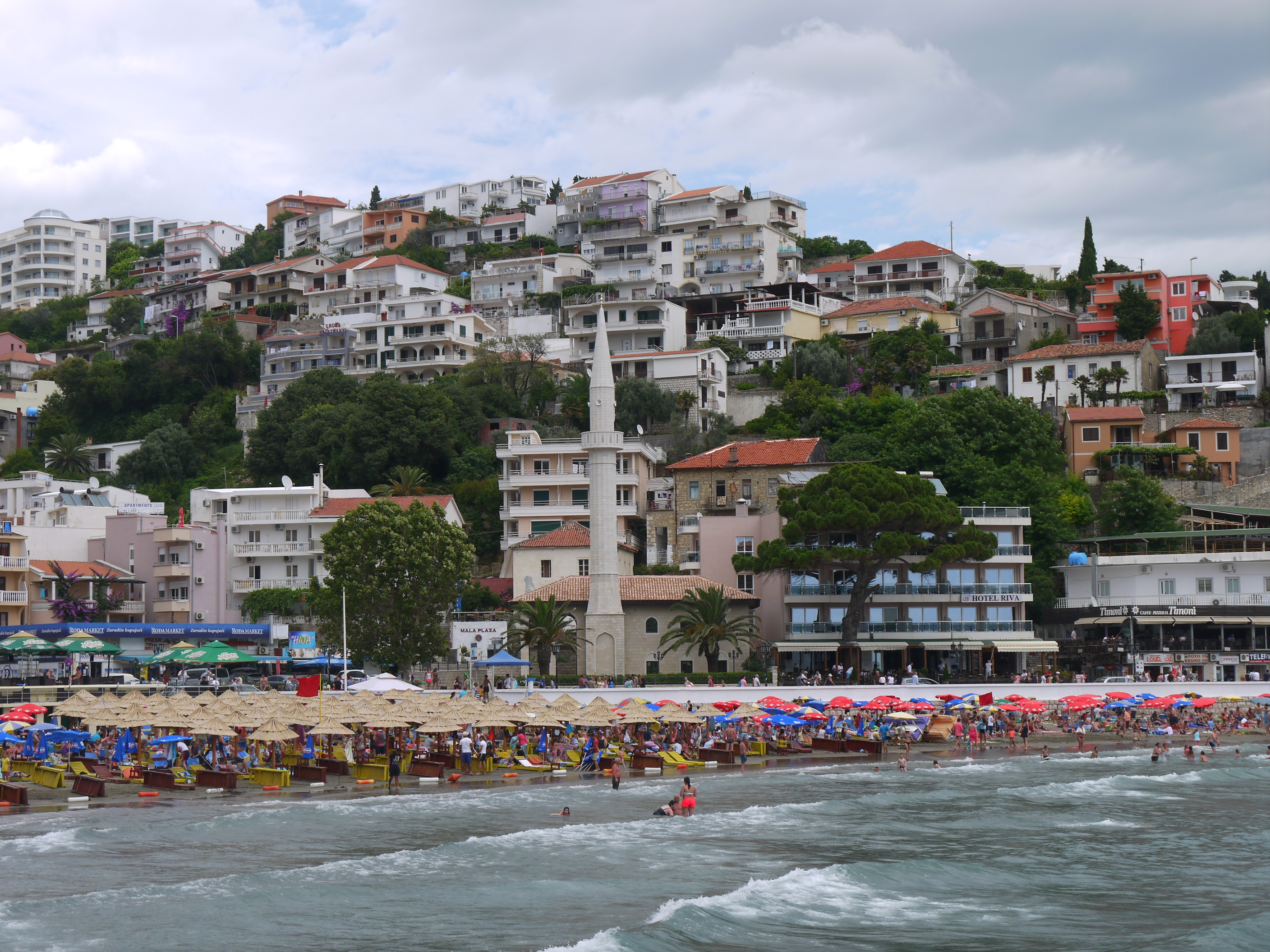
Sailors' Mosque in Ulcinj

== See also ==
- Religion in Montenegro
- Islamic Community of Montenegro
