= Dosuđe =

Dosuđe Досуђе Dosugje
- Village
- Location within Montenegro
- Coordinates: 42.570118°N 19.846448°E
- Country: Montenegro
- Region: Northern
- Municipality: Gusinje

Population (2011)
  - Total: 306
- Time zone: UTC+1 (CET)
  - Summer (DST): UTC+2 (CEST)

Dosuđe (Montenegrin Cyrillic: Досуђе; Albanian: Dosugje) is a village in the municipality of Gusinje, Montenegro.

== History ==
The earliest mention of the village was recorded in the late 13th century, within the Medieval Serbian State ruled by The Nemanjić Dynasty. It was the very charter of Serbian king Milutin (1282-1321) issued between 1282 and 1298, in which the king confirmed the donations of his grandfather and his father to The Hilandar Monastery of Mount Athos along with including donations of his own. Among the villages assigned to support the monastery, paragraph X stipulates "оу плавѣ село досуге и сЬ заселиѥмь, that is "within the Župa Plav the village of Dosuđe and its confines - župa being the administrative unit similar to a county or a parish.

The Gjokaj brotherhood of Hoti from Hoti i Vendit founded Dosuđe (Dosugja) in the 18th century.

== Demographics ==
According to the 2011 census, its population was 306. The population is majority Muslim. The Albanians of this village speak with the Gheg dialect of the Albanian language.

Ethnicity in 2011
Ethnicity	Number	Percentage
Bosniaks	181	59.2%
Albanians	62	20.3%
Serbs	35	11.4%
Montenegrins	11	3.6%
other/undeclared	17	5.6%
Total	306	100%
