= Dolja, Gusinje =

Dolja Doli
- Village
- Location within Montenegro
- Coordinates: 42.558213°N 19.809793°E
- Country: Montenegro
- Region: Northern
- Municipality: Gusinje

Population (2011)
  - Total: 128
- Time zone: UTC+1 (CET)
  - Summer (DST): UTC+2 (CEST)

Dolja (Albanian: Doli) (Montenegrin Cyrillic: Доља) is a village in the municipality of Gusinje, Montenegro.

== Demographics ==
According to the 2011 census, its population was 128.

Ethnicity in 2011
| Ethnicity | Number | Percentage |
|---|---|---|
| Albanians | 53 | 41.4% |
| Bosniaks | 27 | 21.1% |
| Montenegrins | 22 | 17.2% |
| other/undeclared | 26 | 20.3% |
| Total | 128 | 100% |
