= Religion in Montenegro =

Religion in Montenegro (2023 census)
1. Eastern Orthodoxy (71.1%)
2. Catholicism (3.27%)
3. Other Christians (0.57%)
4. Islam (20.0%)
5. No religion (2.69%)
6. Other religions (0.28%)
7. Undeclared (2.10%)

Christianity is the most widely professed religion in Montenegro, representing 74.4% of the total population, with Eastern Orthodoxy as the largest denomination, which is adhered to by 71.1% of the population. In addition to Christianity, there is also a sizeable number of adherents to Islam at 20% of the population.

Montenegro has no official religion and freedom of religion is a right defined by the country's Constitution, which also defines all religious communities as equal before the law and separate from the state.

== Demographics ==
2023 census
Religion	Population	%
Eastern Orthodox	443,394	71.1
Roman Catholic	20,408	3.2
Protestant	568	0.1
Christianity	464,370	74.4
Islam	124,668	20.0
Atheist	14,260	2.3
Agnostic	2,524	0.4
Other	22,859	2.8

Historical preview
Religion	1991	2003	2011	2023
Eastern Orthodox	69.1	74.2	72.0	71.1
Islam	19.2	17.7	19.1	20.0
Roman Catholic	4.4	3.5	3.4	3.2
Protestant	1.4	0.4	0.4	0.1
Irreligious / Atheist	1.6	0.9	1.2	2.3
Agnostic	1.6	0.9	0.07	0.4
Other	0.1	0.07	1.0	0.1
Udeclared/unknown	4.0	3.0	2.6	2.3

Ethnicity by religion	Total		Montenegrins		Serbs		Bosniaks		Albanians		Roma		Croats	
Ethnicity by religion	Number	%	Number	%	Number	%	Number	%	Number	%	Number	%	Number	%
Eastern Orthodox	443,394	71.1	211,398	82.4	203,990	99.3	/	/	51	0.1	410	7.3	157	3.0
Islam	124,668	20.0	22,292	8.7	98	0.04	58,859	99.8	22,520	72.7	5,092	90.4	/	/
Roman Catholic	20,408	3.2	5,795	2.2	130	0.06	/	/	8,085	26.1	/	/	4,580	88.9
Protestant	568	0.1	196	0.07	51	0.02	/	/	36	0.1	2	0.0	10	0.02
Atheist/Agnostic	16,784	2.7	11,296	4.4	587	0.3	41	0.07	70	0.2	/	/	234	4.5

== Christianity ==
Cathedral of the Resurrection of Christ in Podgorica

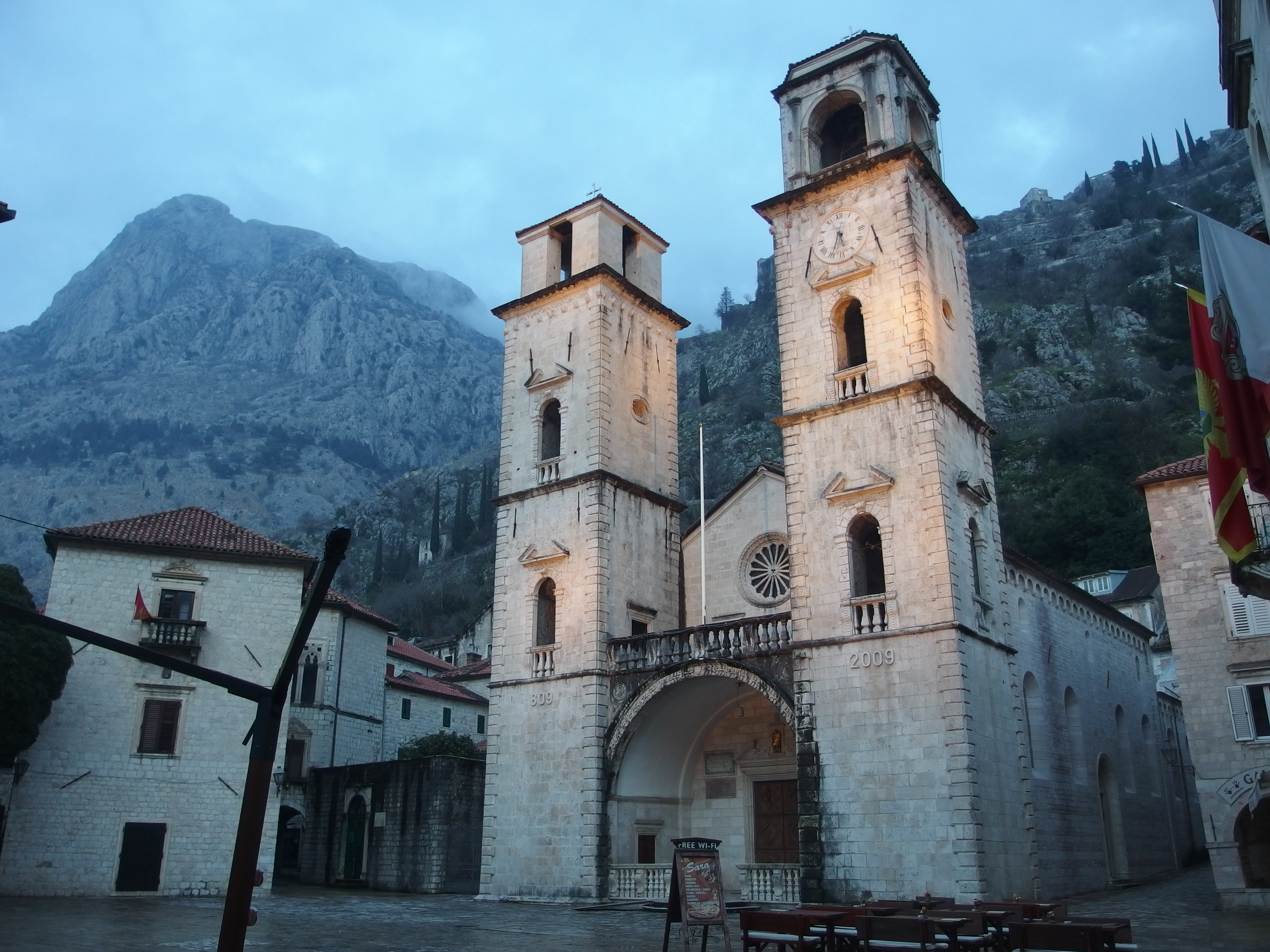
St. Tryphon Cathedral in Kotor

=== Eastern Orthodoxy ===
Adherents of Eastern Orthodoxy in Montenegro are predominantly ethnic Montenegrins and Serbs. Ethnic Montenegrins are divided between a majority affiliated with the Serbian Orthodox Church and a minority affiliated with the canonically unrecognized Montenegrin Orthodox Church, while Serbs overwhelmingly adhere to the Serbian Orthodox Church.

=== Catholicism ===
Most Catholics are ethnic Albanians and Croats as well as some Montenegrins.

== Islam ==
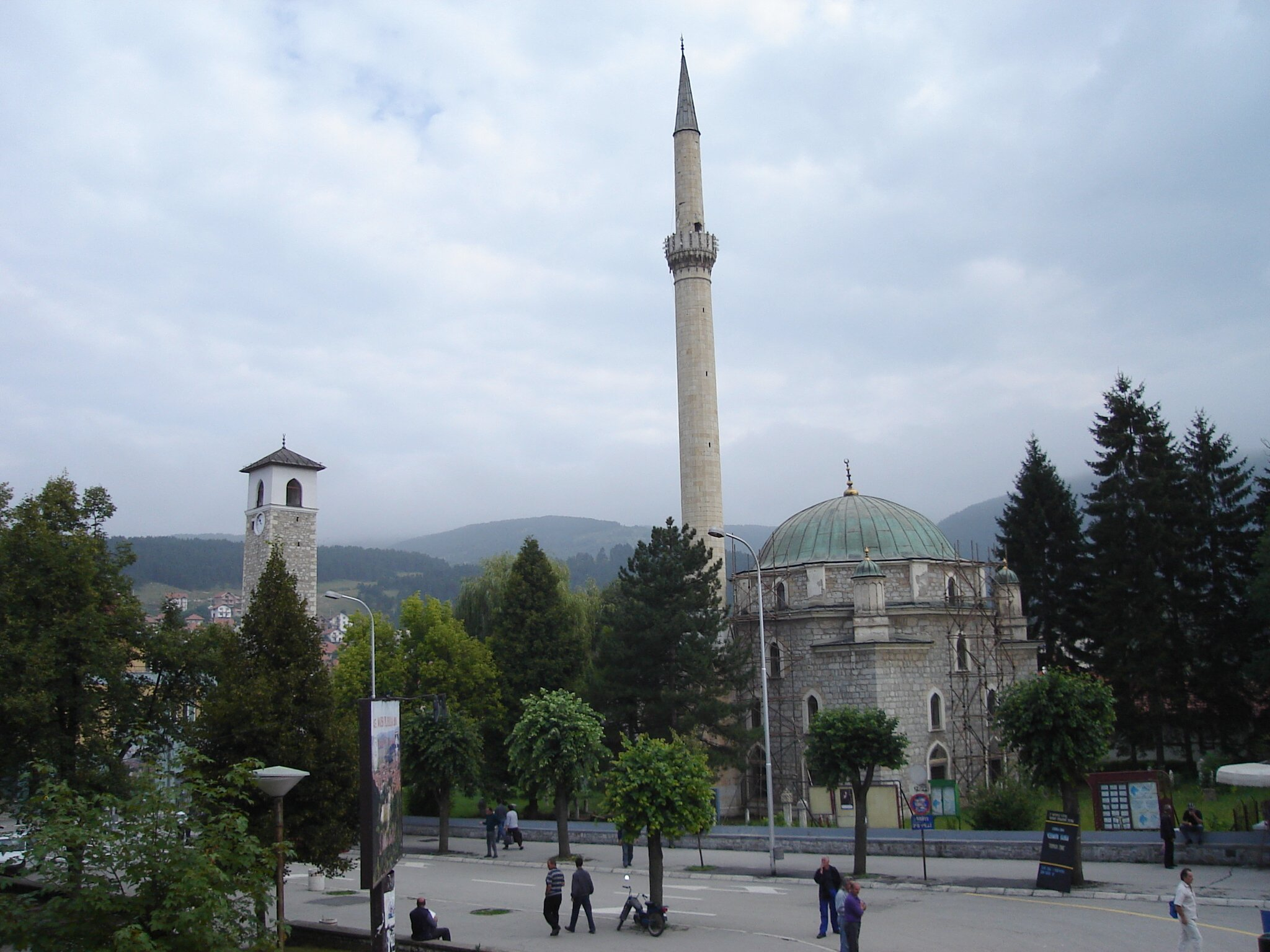
Husein-paša's Mosque in Pljevlja

Islam is the largest minority religion in the country. Muslims in Montenegro are divided into two main groups, and further subgroups:

  - Bosnian-speaking ethnic Bosniak Muslim
  - Other Slavic Muslims (ethnic Muslims), including Gorani, and other Slavs of the Muslim faith who identify by religion rather than by ethnicity.
- Albanian Muslims
  - Albanian-speaking ethnic Albanian Muslims
  - Romani people

Islam is the dominant religion in the northeastern municipalities, which are part of the Sandžak geographical region, and in municipalities where Albanians form a majority. Islam is the majority religion in the municipalities of Gusinje, Petnjica, Plav, Rožaje, Tuzi and Ulcinj.

== Judaism ==
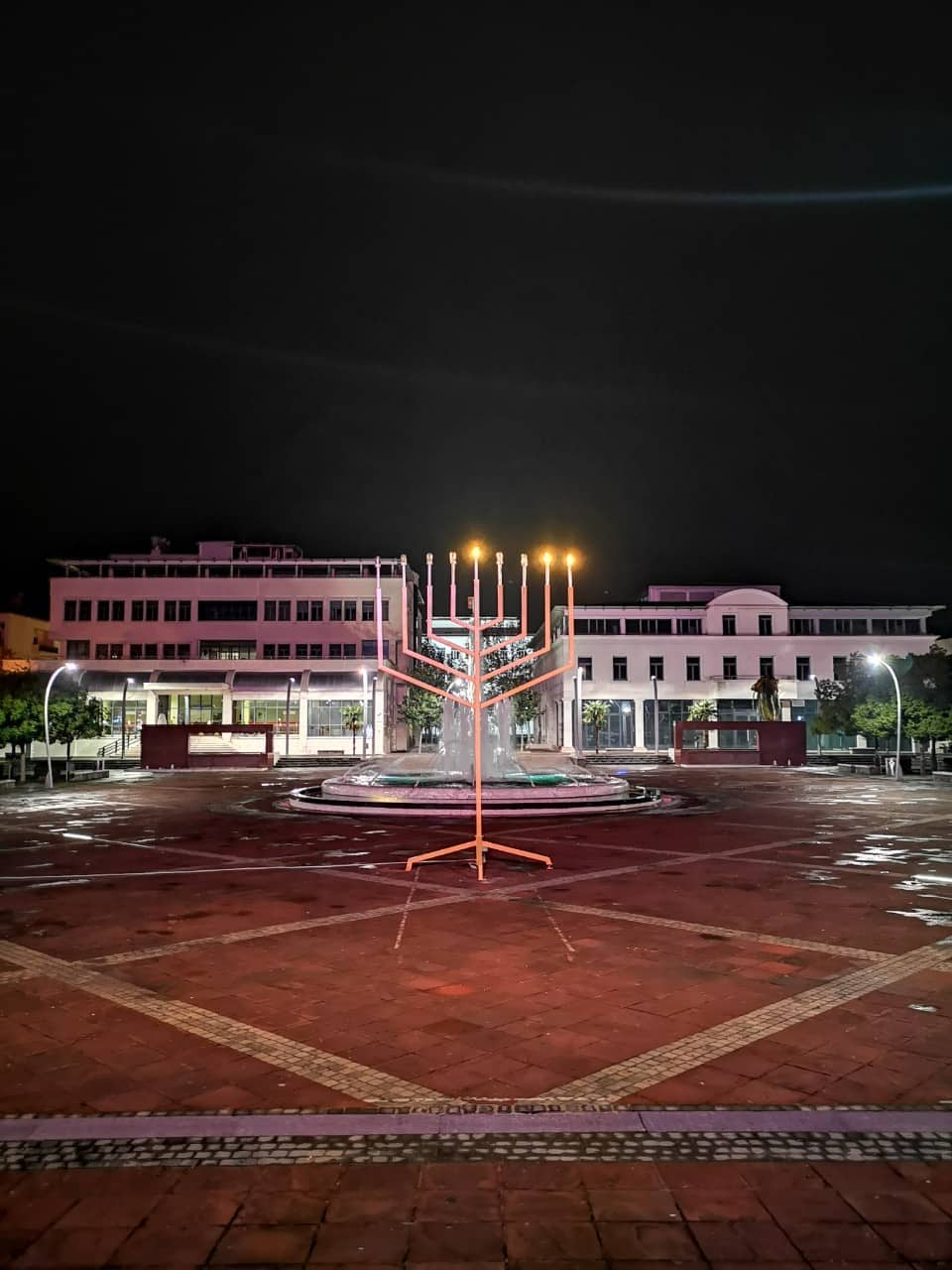
Hanukkah celebration in Podgorica

According to the World Jewish Congress, there were approximately 400 to 500 Jews in the country in 2022. There is a high respect for the Jewish people and its contribution to the secular civilization. In 2012, the Prime Minister of Montenegro Igor Lukšić signed an agreement with the Montenegrin Jewish community to grant official recognition of Jews as a minority in Montenegro. The agreement also established Judaism as the country's fourth official religion, along with the Eastern Orthodox Church, Catholic Church and Islam.

== Atheism ==
Religiosity is lowest in the Bay of Kotor region and the capital city of Podgorica. Municipalities with highest share of atheists are Herceg Novi (2.43%), Kotor (2.03%), Podgorica (1.99%) and Tivat (1.7%). In contrast, Rožaje has the fewest atheists, who make up only 0.01% of its population.

== Religious freedom ==
Montenegro's laws guarantee the freedom of religion and outlaw several forms of religious discrimination, as well as establishing that there is no state religion in Montenegro. The government provides some funding to religious groups.

According to a 2017 survey conducted by the Council of Europe in cooperation with the Office of the Ombudsperson of Montenegro, 45% of respondents reported having experienced religious discrimination.

In 2023, the country was scored 3 out of 4 for religious freedom.

== Sources ==
- Cattaruzza, Amaël; Michels, Patrick (2005). "Dualité orthodoxe au Monténégro". Balkanologie: Revue d'études pluridisciplinaires. 9 (1–2): 235–253.
- Džankić, Jelena (2016). "Religion and Identity in Montenegro". Monasticism in Eastern Europe and the Former Soviet Republics. London-New York: Routledge. pp. 110–129. ISBN 9781317391050.
- Morrison, Kenneth (2009). Montenegro: A Modern History. London-New York: I.B.Tauris.
- Morrison, Kenneth; Čagorović, Nebojša (2014). "The Political Dynamics of Intra-Orthodox Conflict in Montenegro". Politicization of Religion, the Power of State, Nation, and Faith: The Case of Former Yugoslavia and its Successor States. New York: Palgrave Macmillan. pp. 151–170. doi:10.1057/9781137477866_7. ISBN 978-1-349-50339-1.
- Živković, Tibor (2012). De conversione Croatorum et Serborum: A Lost Source. Belgrade: The Institute of History.
- Živković, Tibor (2013). "On the Baptism of the Serbs and Croats in the Time of Basil I (867–886)" (PDF). Studia Slavica et Balcanica Petropolitana (1): 33–53.
