= Kolenovići =

Kolenović Коленовић Kolendar
- Village
- Location within Montenegro
- Coordinates: 42.554159°N 19.841228°E
- Country: Montenegro
- Region: Northern
- Municipality: Gusinje

Population (2011)
  - Total: 165
- Time zone: UTC+1 (CET)
  - Summer (DST): UTC+2 (CEST)

Kolenovići (Montenegrin Cyrillic: Коленовићи) is a village in the municipality of Gusinje, Montenegro.

== Demographics ==
According to the 2011 census, its population was 165.

Ethnicity in 2011
Ethnicity	Number	Percentage
Bosniaks	121	73.3%
Serbs	11	6.7%
Montenegrins	8	4.8%
Albanians	7	4.2%
other/undeclared	18	10.9%
Total	165	100%
