= Gusinje Municipality =

Coordinates: 42°33′N 19°50′E

Gusinje Municipality Opština Gusinje Општина Гусиње Komuna e Gucisë
- Municipality
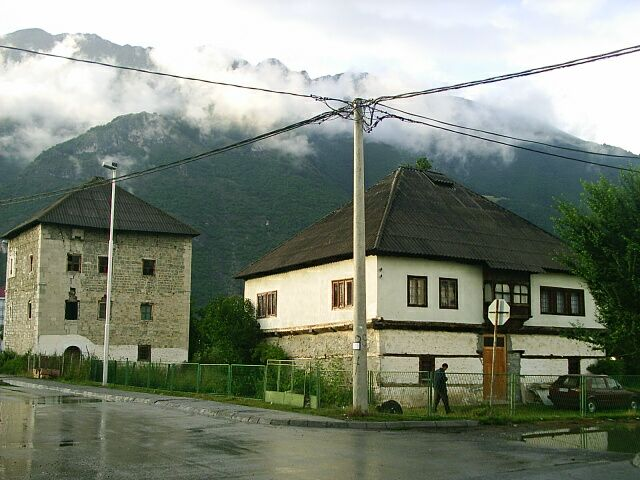

- Coat of arms
- Nickname: Gusti grad
- Gusinje Municipality in Montenegro
- Country: Montenegro
- Municipality formed: 2014
- Municipal seat: Gusinje

Government
  - Mayor: Sanel Balić (BS)

Area
  - Total: 157 km^{2} (61 sq mi)

Population (2011)
  - Total: 4,239
  - Density: 27.0/km^{2} (69.9/sq mi)
- Time zone: UTC+1 (CET)
  - Summer (DST): UTC+2 (CEST)
- Postal code: 84326
- Area code: +382 51
- ISO 3166 code: ME-22
- Website: opstinagusinje.me

Gusinje (Montenegrin: Opština Gusinje / Општина Гусиње; Albanian: Komuna e Gucisë) is a municipality in northern Montenegro. It is located in the upper Lim valley at an elevation of about 1,000 m (3,000 ft). It was created in 2014, when it split from Plav Municipality. Its center is the small town of Gusinje, and its biggest village in terms of territory is Vusanje. Two of Montenegro's highest mountains overlook Gusinje: Zla Kolata and Visitor. Many of Gusinje's settlements are historically linked with the Albanian Kelmendi tribe (fis). The village of Gusinje developed into a town the 17th century around a fortress built by the Ottomans to contain the Kelmendi. In the 19th century, Gusinje was a developing regional market center. It was engulfed in 1879–1880 in a struggle between the Principality of Montenegro that wanted to annex it and the League of Prizren that opposed it. After the Balkan Wars, Gusinje became part of Montenegro and in 1919 part of Yugoslavia. Today, it is part of Montenegro since its declaration of independence in 2006.

== Geography ==
Gusinje and neighbouring Plav are part of the upper Lim valley in the Accursed Mountains. The features of the area show heavy glaciation. They indicate that a glacier up to 35 km (22 mi) long and 200 m (660 ft) wide existed in the past in Plav-Gusinje. The municipality's settlements stands at an elevation of about 1,000 m (3,300 ft). They are surrounded by some of the highest mountains in Montenegro. Zla Kolata, the highest mountain in Montenegro is located in the National Park "Prokletije" of the Accursed Mountains range, about 10 km (6.2 mi) south of the town itself. Mount Visitor overlooks Gusinje and Plav. At the mountain's foothills stands the village of Martinovići.

Gusinje is traversed by the Vermosh River into which pours the Vruja Creek as it moves eastwards towards Plav. Vruja is formed at Ali Pasha's wellsprings (Alipašini izvori/Krojet e Ali Pashës) about 2 km (1.2 mi) south of Gusinje's center near the village of Vusanje. The part of Vermosh between the location where it meets Vruja and Plav is locally called Luca. Vermosh then pours into Lake Plav. It is the first tributary of Lim.

The town of Gusinje is the seat of the municipality. From 1953 to 2014, it was part of Plav Municipality. In 2014, it became again a distinct municipality. It covers 157 km^{2} (61 sq mi), 1.1% of the total area of Montenegro. Much of the area of the municipality is mountainous land used in the past for livestock herding. The territory of Vusanje covers about 1/3 of the municipality. The municipality's settlements are Dolja/Doli, Dosuđe/Dosugja, Grnčar/Gërnçar, Kolenovići/Kolinë, Kruševo/Kryshevë, Martinovići/Martinaj, Višnjevo/Vishnjevë, Vusanje/Vuthaj and the town of Gusinje/Guci.

== History ==
In antiquity, the area of Gusinje was inhabited by the Illyrian tribe of the Labeatae. Close to Lake Plav lived another tribe, the Autariatae. The name of the area may come from an Illyrian toponym Geusiae from which the Albanian name of Gusinje, Guci(a), would have evolved. From the Roman era, remains of a cemetery in Višnjevo and a church in Dolja have been bound. There is also evidence that a mine was operating in the region.

In 1330, the toponym Hotina Gora (mountains of Hoti) in the Plav and Gusinje regions on the Lim river basin in 1330. It is the first mention of the Albanian tribe Hoti. This region is regarded as their original homeland before they moved southwards and settled to their historical territory. It is known that a medieval settlement was located in the territory of present-day Gusinje. Gusinje was mentioned as a caravan station on the Ragusa-Cattaro–Scutari–Peć route, in the 14th century. In historical record, Gusinje appears in 1485 in the defter of the sanjak of Scutari as a village in the vilayet of Plav, a hass-ı hümayun (imperial domain) that stood directly under the Ottoman Sultan. It had 96 households, 21 unmarried men and four widows. This was a big settlement compared to other villages in Montenegro and northern Albania. The vilayet of Plav was a relatively densely populated area with 15 villages and over 1,000 households. Most of the villages - with the exception of Gusinje - were concentrated around Lake Plav and to the north of it.

Gusinje stood at the intersection of the Ottoman trade routes between northern Albania, Montenegro and Kosovo. Thus, the trade that passed through Gusinje generated much wealth for the Sultan and the Ottoman officials who were granted taxing rights. This made the trade route a constant target for the Albanian tribal community (fis) of Kelmendi, which lived along the route as they were in rebellion against the Ottomans and were plundering their trade routes. Venetian diplomat Mariano Bolizza who travelled in the region reported that at the end of 1612 the building of the fortress of Gusinje - near which the modern town developed - was completed. The location was chosen because it stands at the convergence of pathways from Kelmendi. The original location of the fort was near the village of Grnćar. Modern Gusinje stands ~6 km to the west and ~10 km to the north of the routes from the Kelmendi mountains (malet e Kelmendit) to modern Sandžak. The surrounding villages to the west and south (Vusanje) are Kelmendi settlements. The fortress was built at the request of Sem Zaus, the Ottoman bey of Podgorica who wanted to stop the attacks of Kelmendi and to be able to travel freely in his domain. The fortress was also designed to stop the movement of the Kuči and Triepshi tribes in the Upper Lim valley. In 1614, Mariano Bolizza reported that the village of Gusinje had 100 households and a garrison of 237 men under Belo Juvanin.

In time despite Ottoman expeditions and relocations of these communities in Sandžak, Kelmendi and other tribes like Kuči, Triepshi, Shala and Hoti came to form many of the historical neighbourhoods (mahalla) of Gusinje of today. Many of the settlements of today's Gusinje were also largely created by Kelmendi. The descendants of the communities although initially Christian, willingly or forcefully converted to Islam, largely by the middle 18th century. At the beginning of the 18th century, Gusinje was the seat of the local kadiluk. In 1703, the Ottomans tried again to expel Kelmendi entirely from the highlands. At that time, many were forced to resettle in the Pešter plateau. Those who remained in their villages in Gusinje were allowed to do so on the condition that they convert to Islam. The strongest family in the Gusinje region at the end of the 17th century were the Shabanagaj (now also known as Šabanagić) of Gruemiri. Shaban Aga, their eponymous ancestor was the son-in-law of Sulejman Pasha Bushati, sanjakbey of Shkodra. He was sent in Gusinje as the commander of the fortress around 1690.

In terms of military administration, the captaincy of Gusinje was part of the Bosnia Eyalet in 1724. An important family - which later developed into a brotherhood - in the development of Gusinje is that of the Omeragaj (today known as Omeragić) from Shala who appeared in the village in the early 18th century. Central Ottoman administration collapsed in the decades to come and the Pashalik of Shkodra emerged as a regional power. Its downfall in 1831 brought back actual Ottoman rule. In 1852, in the register of the Kosovo Vilayet, Gusinje is recorded with 1,500 households. It was a developing town that had 350 shops, eight madrasas and five mosques. Much of the population of the Plav-Gusinje area were free peasants who held private land property in contrast to the population of Berane to the north, many of whom were serfs or landless farm workers. The captaincy of Gusinje in 1869 was part of the sanjak of Prizren.

As the Ottoman Empire disintegrated in the long 19th century already in the Treaty of San Stefano, Gusinje and Plav were awarded to the independent Principality of Montenegro. Gusinje was developing as a commercial town at the time, but still remained outside properly established rule of Ottoman law. Gun ownership was widespread and Ottoman rule was difficult to enforce. This environment allowed for the existence of an effective resistance against annexation. The Albanians of Gusinje opposed the decisions of the treaty and sent telegrams of protest to the embassies of the Great Powers. In the Congress of Berlin and its final treaty those decisions were finalized. The Albanians in the two regions reacted against the final decision in favor annexation and formed the League of Prizren.

A noted figure of the League of Prizren was Ali Pasha Shabanagaj, a landowner and military commander from Gusinje. In the ensuing Battle of Novšiće the League of Prizren led by Shabanagaj defeated the approaching Montenegrin forces led by Marko Miljanov. More than 140 dead and wounded of the ~300 casualties of the League of Prizren in the battle were from Gusinje. Ismail Omeraga, was a leading commander the Gusinje volunteers who died in the battles for the defense of Plav-Gusinje in Qafa e Pravisë. His head was carried back in Cetinje, capital of Montenegro. Reports after the battle claim that the victors carried into the town 60 heads from their defeated foes. The annexation was effectively stopped and the Great Powers began another round of negotiations which eventually led to Ulcinj's annexation by Montenegro as compensation. The battle became a point of reference in the Albanian National Awakening and set a precedent about the need of armed struggle to defend other areas. Although the battle took place near Novšiće which is ~4 km to the north of Plav, in the Ottoman press of the time it became known as Gusinye hadisesi (Gusinye Incident) because of its crucial role in the struggle.

== Cultural monuments ==
In Gusinje there are a number of the historical mosques of Montenegro. The oldest preserved mosque in the town is Čekića džamija or xhamia e Çekaj-vë built by the Çekaj brotherhood of Triepshi. The second oldest is the Vezir's mosque (vezirova džamija/xhamia e Vezirit) built by Kara Mahmud Bushati in 1765 on the existing site of another mosque originally built in 1626. It is a symbol of the influence of the Pashalik of Shkodra in the upper Lim valley. The New Mosque (nova džamija/xhamia e re) also known as Radončića was built by the Radončići brotherhood of Kuči in 1899. The oldest mosque in Gusinje was that of Sultan Ahmed I which was built during his reign between 1603 and 1617. It was burnt in a fire in 1746-47.

The village of Vusanje/Vuthaj and its hamlets, which represent one third of the total territory of the municipality has three mosques. The oldest is that of upper Vusanje, built in 1710. The mosque of lower Vusanje was built in 1910 by the Gjonbalaj (today, džamija Đonbalića) brotherhood and its third mosque was built by the Qosja (today, džamija Ćosovića). Mosques are also found in the village of Martinovići (1800) and Kruševo. In the village of Dolja, there is Catholic church which was built in 1936 and also houses an ethnographic museum. There is also an Orthodox church dedicated to St. George. It was built in 1926 in the reign of Alexander I of Yugoslavia.

== Demographics ==
The territory of the municipality of Gusinje has experienced many waves of immigration since 1913. These have depopulated it as a result in the 21st century. The municipality of Gusinje reports a total diaspora of ~30,000 from the Gusinje area. In 2012, around 18,400 people traced their origins to the town of Gusinje, most of whom lived in the US. In 2023, 65% of the people from Gusinje declared a Slavic language as their native language (including Bosnian, Montenegrin and Serbian) while 34% of them declared Albanian as their first language. The Slavic dialect of Gusinje and Plav shows very high structural influence from Albanian. Its uniqueness in terms of language contact between Albanian and Slavic is explained by the fact that most Slavic-speakers in today's Gusinje are of Albanian origin. Nearly 93% of the people of the municipality are of the Muslim faith, most of them declaring themselves as Bosniaks (57.13%), the other being either Albanians (34.38%) or Muslims by nationality (3.23%). Other ethnicities include around 5% of Montenegrins and Serbs, most of whom are of the Eastern Orthodox faith. About one third of the village of Dolja are Catholics. They form the only compact Catholic community in Gusinje.

Historical demography of Gusinje Municipality
Settlement	1971	1991	2003	2011	2023
Gusinje	2695	2472	1704	1722	2225
Grnčar	541	482	191	184	210
Dolja	562	514	196	137	128
Dosuđe	963	535	265	311	396
Kolenovići	369	452	157	160	189
Kruševo	801	656	340	335	333
Martinoviće	780	722	689	683	399
Višnjevo	216	198	86	64	66
Vusanje	1400	1099	866	644	716
Total	7958	7130	4424	4239	4662

Ethnicity (2023 census)
Bosniaks	57.13%
Albanians	34.38%
Muslims	3.23%
Serbs	2.77%
Montenegrins	1.55%
Others	0.69%
Undeclared	0.25%

Religion (2023 census)
Islam	92.55%
Eastern Orthodox	3.10%
Roman Catholic	1.86%
Others	1.32%
Undeclared	1.17%

== Local politics ==
Party	Seats	Gov't.
DPS	11/30	No
Coalition "AA"	7/30	Yes
BS - LP	3/30	Yes
SD	7/30	Yes
SDP	1/30	Yes
SNP	1/30	No

== Gallery ==
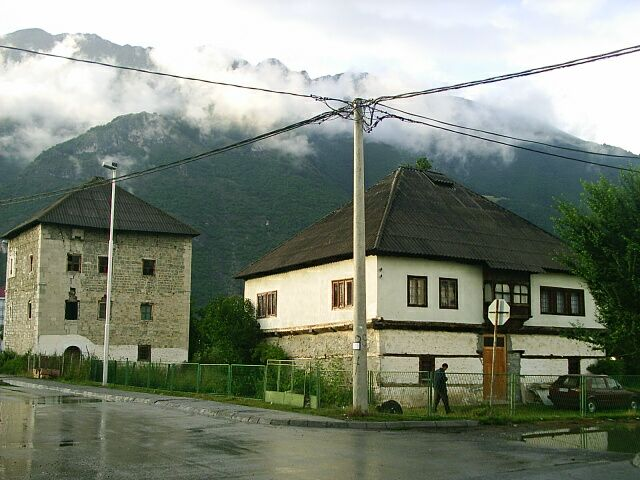
Typical households in Town of Gusinje.

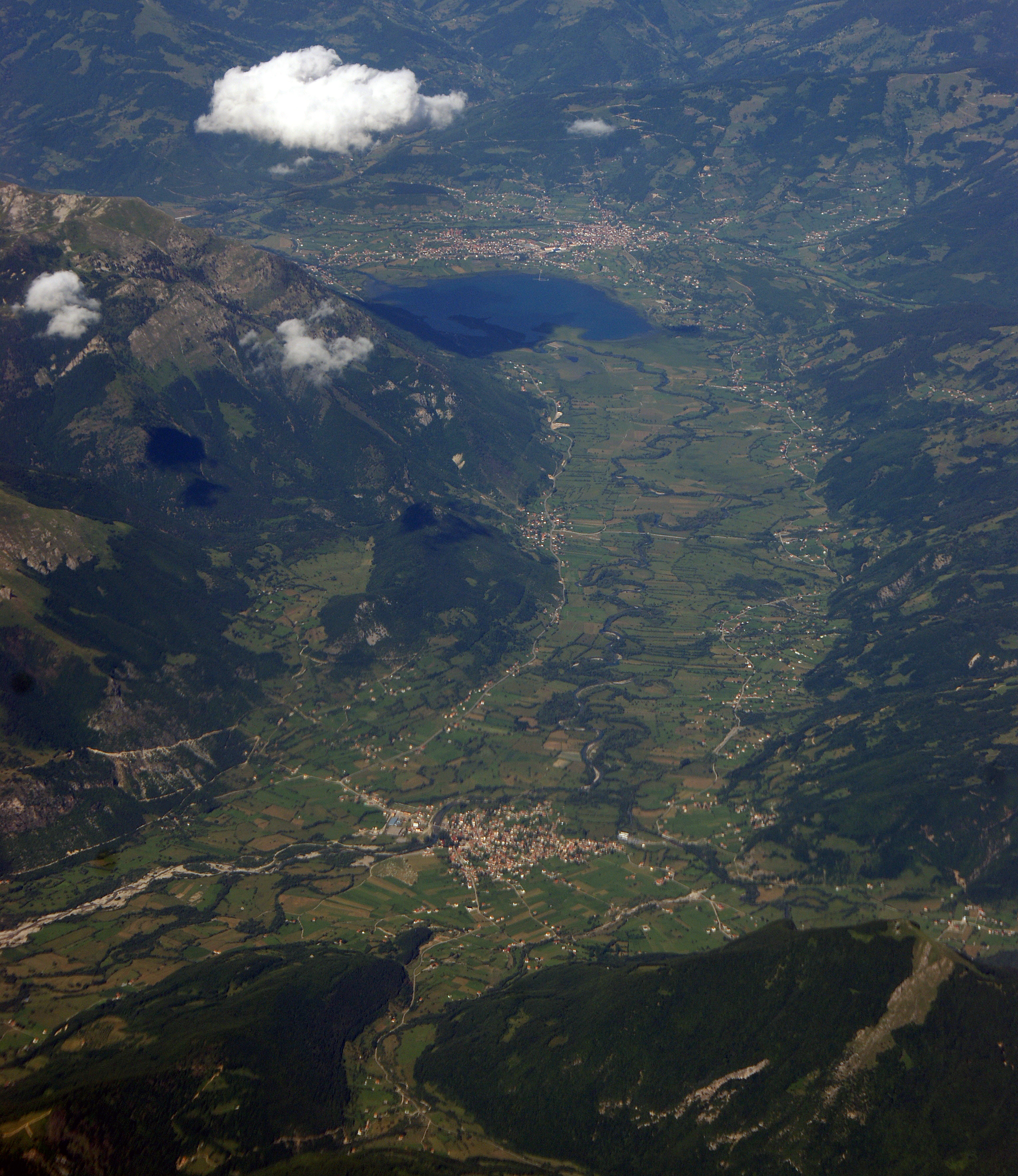
Towns of Gusinje (front) and Plav (background), seen from air.

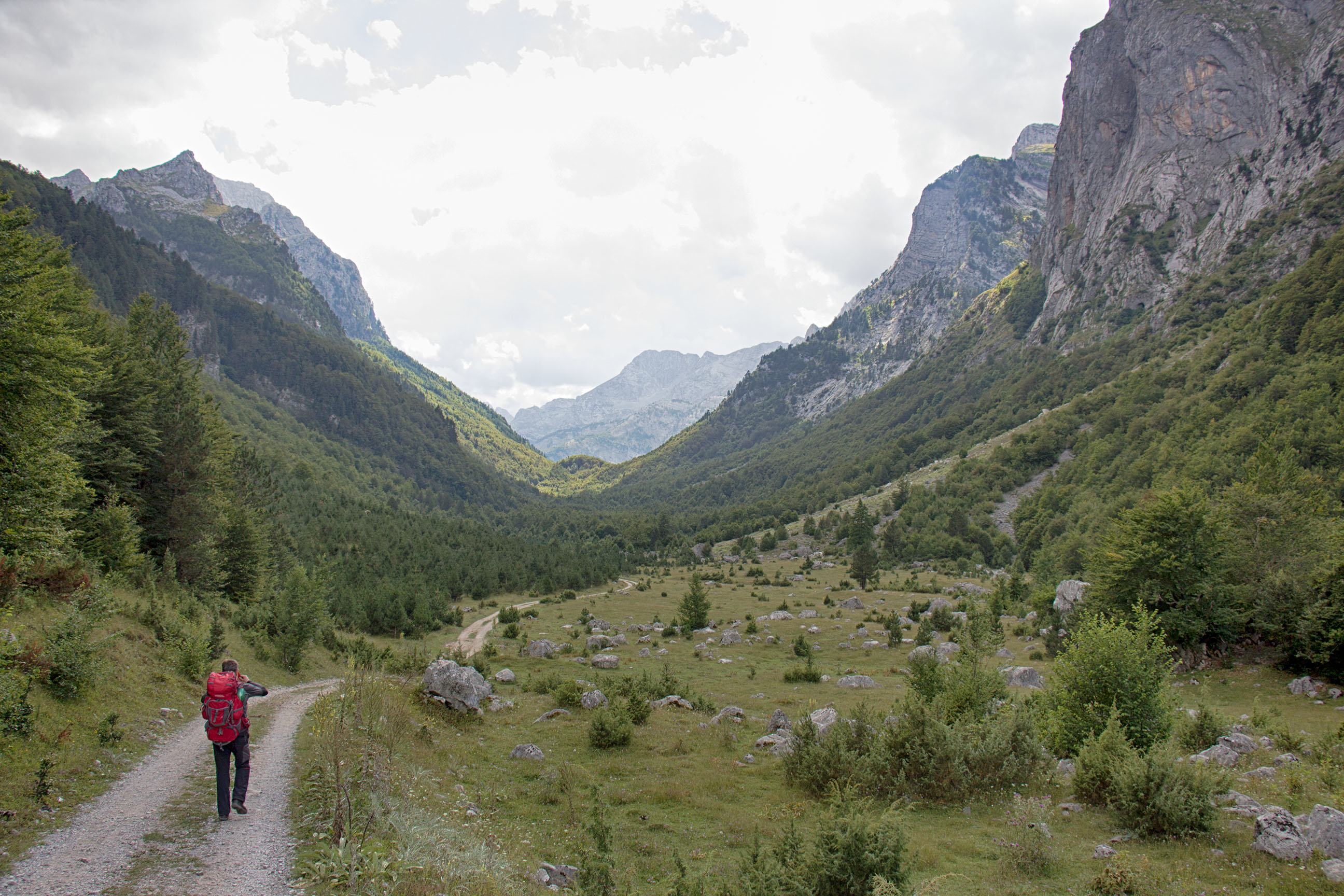
Accursed Mountains range, Gusinje municipality

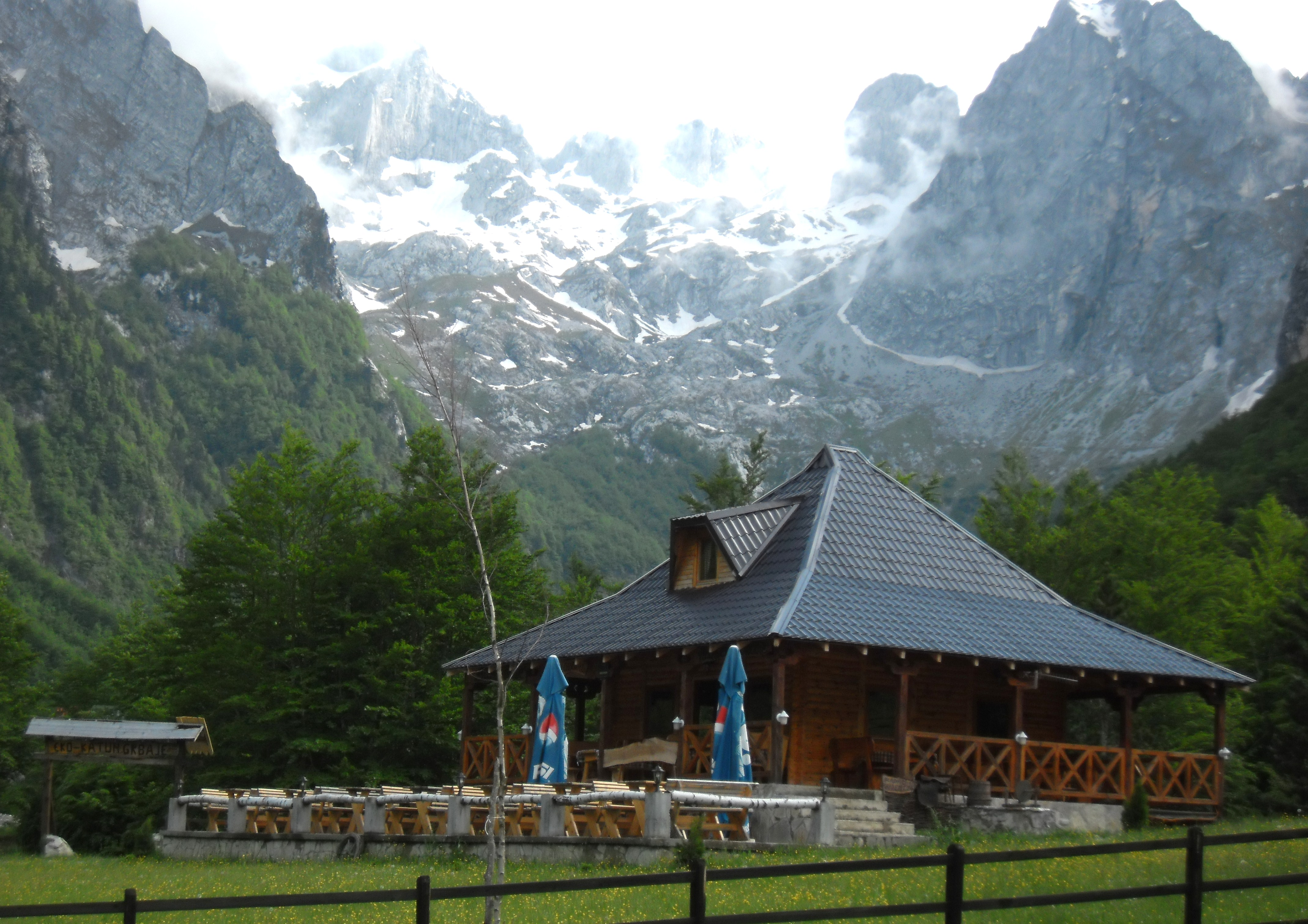
Restaurant in the foothills of the Accursed Mountains

== Sources ==
=== Bibliography ===
- Abraham, Rudolf (2018). The Peaks of the Balkans Trail: Montenegro, Albania and Kosovo. Cicerone Press Limited. ISBN 9781783625567.
- Curtis, Matthew (2012). Slavic-Albanian Language Contact, Convergence, and Coexistence. Ohio State University. ISBN 9781267580337.
- Dedushaj, Rexhep (2012). 100 vjet luftë. New York.
- Dedushaj, Rexhep (1993). Krahina e Plavë-Gucisë nëpër shekuj [The region of Plav-Gusinje throughout the centuries]. New York.
- Elsie, Robert (2003). Early Albania: A reader of Historical texts, 11th–17th centuries. Wiesbaden: Otto Harrassowitz Verlag. ISBN 9783447047838.
- Gawrych, George (2006). The Crescent and the Eagle: Ottoman rule, Islam and the Albanians, 1874–1913. London: IB Tauris. ISBN 9781845112875.
- Hadžić, Fatih (2018). "DŽAMIJE U JUŽNOM SANDŽAKU". Sto Godina Od Sjenicke Konferencije.
- Pulaha, Selami (1974). Defter i Sanxhakut të Shkodrës 1485 [Defter of the Sanjak of Shkodra in 1485. Academy of Sciences of Albania.
- Milošević, Suzana; Guri, Fatmir; Krivčević, Jelena; Djimrevska, Irena (2014). "BASELINE STUDY AND STRATEGIC PLAN FOR DEVELOPMENT OF THE CROSS-BORDER REGION "PROKLETIJE- BJESHKËT E NAMUNA"" (PDF). SEE.
- "STUDIJA O OPRAVDANOSTI OSNIVANJA OPŠTINE GUSINJE" (PDF). Opstina Gusinje. Gusinje Municipality. 2012.
- Šufflay, Milan (2000). Izabrani politički spisi. Matica hrvatska.
- Zajednica osnovnog obrazovanja i vaspitanja (1986). Simpozijum seoski dani Sretena Vukosavljevića. Vol. 11. Prijepolje: Opštinska zajednica obrazovanja.
