= Islamic Community of Montenegro =

Islamic organization in Montenegro

- Islamska Zajednica Crne Gore (Montenegrin and Bosnian); Bashkësia Islame në Malin e Zi (Albanian)
- Formation: 1878; 148 years ago
- Type: Religious organization
- Headquarters: Podgorica, Montenegro
- Official language: Montenegrin, Bosnian & Albanian
- Reis: Rifat Fejzić
- Website: www.monteislam.com

The Islamic Community of Montenegro (Montenegrin and Bosnian: Islamska Zajednica u Crnoj Gori or IZCG, Albanian: Bashkësia Islame në Malin e Zi) is an independent religious organization of Muslims in Montenegro, established as the Muftiate of Montenegro in 1878. The headquarters of the community is in Podgorica and the current leader, titled Reis, is Rifat Fejzić.

== History ==
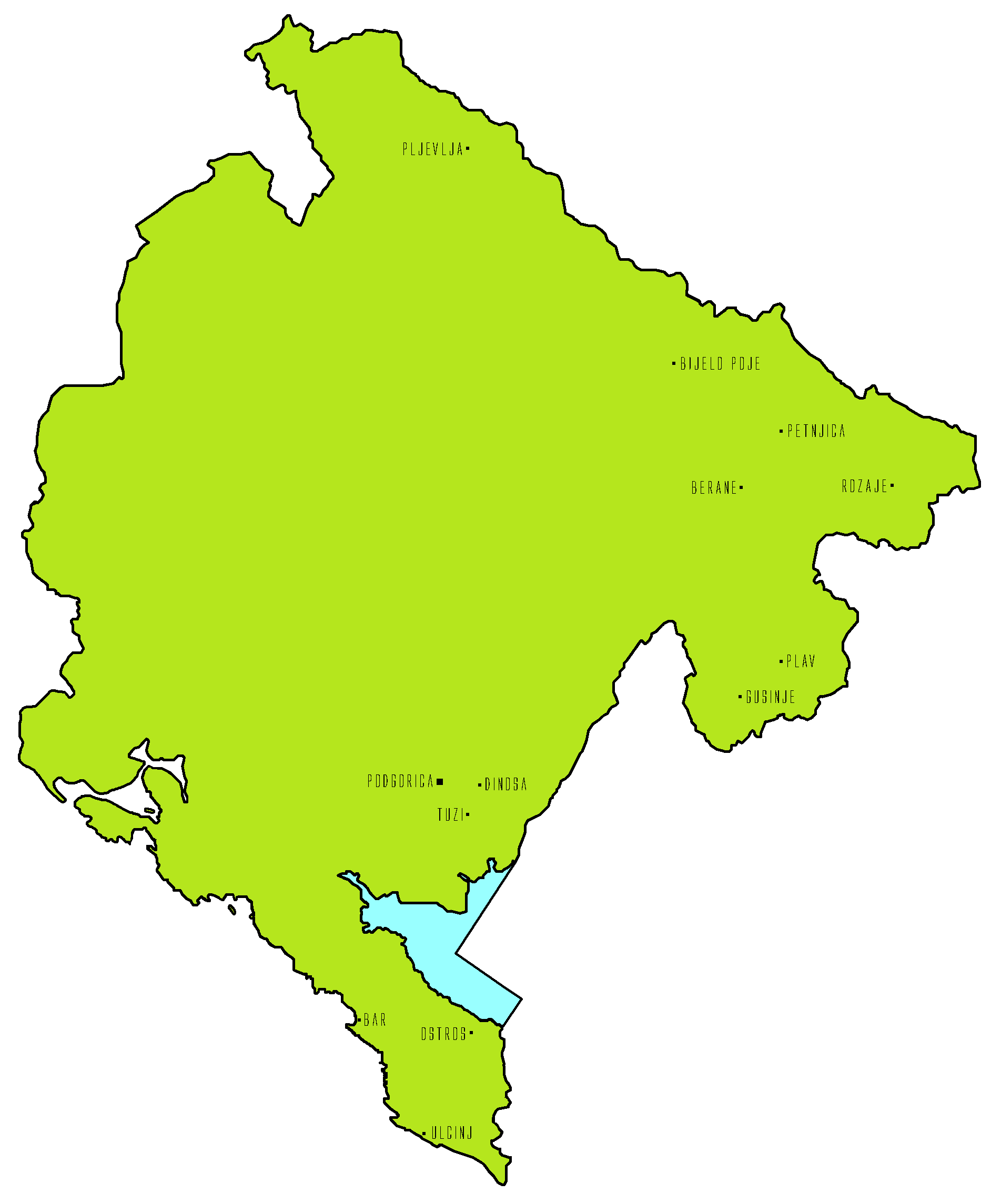
Map of the territories that are under the authority of the Islamic Community of Montenegro.

Montenegro, under Nicholas I, expanded its territories after the Montenegrin–Ottoman War of 1876–1878 and was internationally recognized in 1878 by the Treaty of Berlin as an independent nation. The newly acquired lands had a large Muslim population, and the provisions of the Treaty of Berlin guaranteed Muslims in Montenegro the freedom of religion and the right of religious endowment (waqf) property. In 1878, with the approval of the Shaykh al-Islām, the first Mufti of Montenegro, Salih Efendi Huli, was chosen.

== Structure ==
The Islamic Community is divided into 13 Councils of the Islamic Community: Bar, Berane, Bijelo Polje, Dinoša, Gusinje, Ostros, Petnjica, Plav, Pljevlja, Rožaje, Tuzi, Ulcinj and Podgorica.

== See also ==
- Islam in Montenegro
