= Višnjevo, Gusinje =

Višnjevo Вишњево Vishnjë
- Village
- Location within Montenegro
- Coordinates: 42.558833°N 19.884833°E
- Country: Montenegro
- Region: Northern
- Municipality: Gusinje

Population (2011)
  - Total: 60
- Time zone: UTC+1 (CET)
  - Summer (DST): UTC+2 (CEST)

Višnjevo (Montenegrin Cyrillic: Вишњево; Albanian: Vishnjë) is a village in the municipality of Gusinje, Montenegro.

== Demographics ==
According to the 2011 census, its population was 60. The population is majority Muslim. The Albanians of this village speak with the Gheg dialect of the Albanian language.

Ethnicity in 2011
| Ethnicity | Number | Percentage |
|---|---|---|
| Albanians | 31 | 51,67% |
| Bosniaks | 29 | 48,33% |
| Total | 60 | 100% |
