= Visitor (mountain) =

Massif in the Dinaric Alps, Montenegro

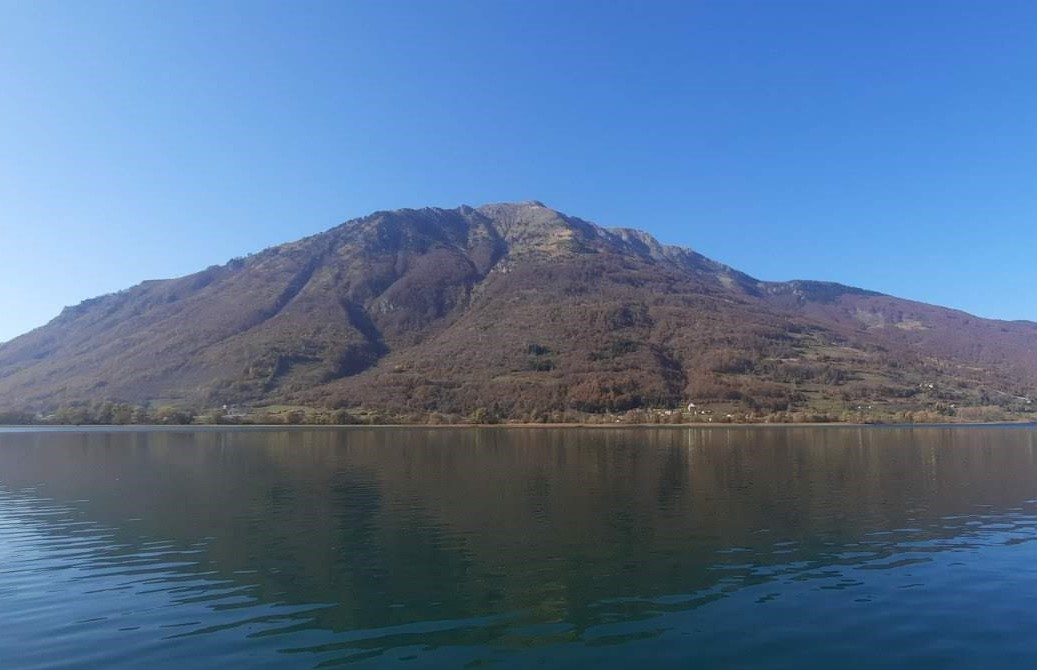
- Visitor mountain from Lake Plav.

Highest point
- Elevation: 2,211 m (7,254 ft)
- Coordinates: 42°36′36″N 19°53′30″E

Geography
- Location within Montenegro
- Location: Montenegro

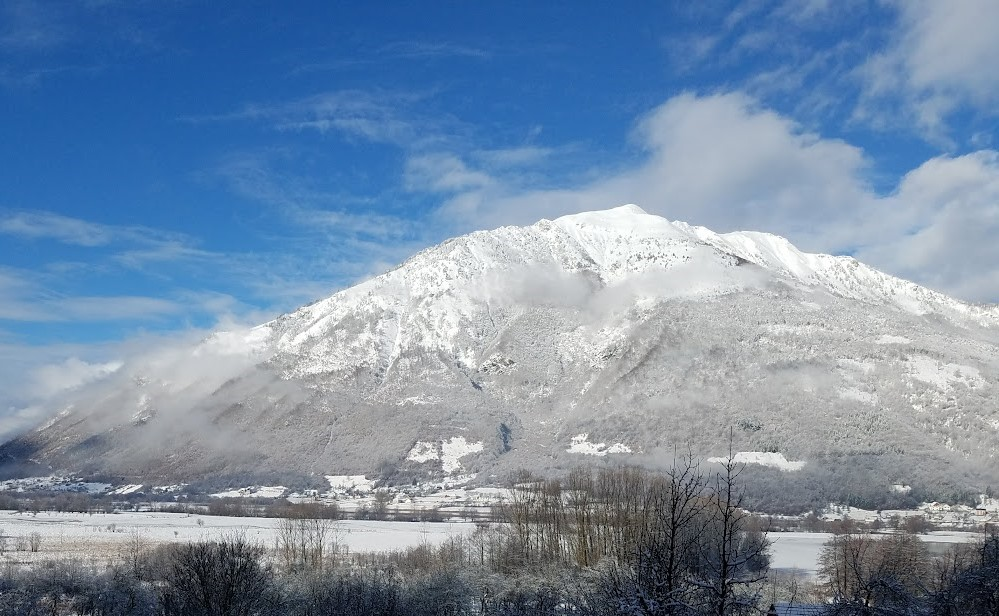
Visitor in winter

Visitor (Montenegrin: Виситор) is a 2,211-metre-high (7,254 ft) mountain in the Dinaric Alps in Montenegro. It is situated west of Plav and Lake Plav (Montenegrin: Plavsko jezero), from which the river Lim flows. The Visitor mountain stretches for 12 kilometres to the north-west of the Plav lake and reaches the altitude of 2,211 m (7,254 ft) at the Bandera or Plana summit. It is home to the eponymous lake (Montenegrin: Visitorsko jezero) (1,820 m (5,971 ft) above sea level, 92 m (302 ft) long, 73 m (240 ft) wide, 4 m (13 ft) deep). While Visitor foothills are covered with forest, its upper part is made up of alpine meadows and rocks.
