= Višnjevo, Travnik =

Višnjevo
- Village
- Location within Bosnia and Herzegovina
- Coordinates: 44.3059122°N 17.7036261°E
- Country: Bosnia and Herzegovina
- Entity: Federation of Bosnia and Herzegovina
- Canton: Central Bosnia
- Municipality: Travnik

Area
  - Total: 5.48 sq mi (14.20 km^{2})

Population (2013)
  - Total: 958
  - Density: 175/sq mi (67.5/km^{2})
- Time zone: UTC+1 (CET)
  - Summer (DST): UTC+2 (CEST)

Višnjevo is a village in the municipality of Travnik, Bosnia and Herzegovina.

== Demographics ==
According to the 2013 census, its population was 958.

Ethnicity in 2013
| Ethnicity | Number | Percentage |
|---|---|---|
| Bosniaks | 938 | 97.9% |
| Serbs | 1 | 0.1% |
| other/undeclared | 19 | 2.0% |
| Total | 958 | 100% |
