= Veliki Ostros =

Veliki Ostros Велики Острос Ostrosi i Madh
- Village
- Location within Montenegro
- Coordinates: 42.078293°N 19.315971°E
- Country: Montenegro
- Municipality: Bar

Population (2011)
  - Total: 332
- Time zone: UTC+1 (CET)
  - Summer (DST): UTC+2 (CEST)

Veliki Ostros (Cyrillic: Велики Острос; Albanian: Ostrosi i Madh) is a village in the municipality of Bar, Montenegro. It is located close to the Albanian border in the Skadarska Krajina region, by Lake Skadar.

== Demographics ==
According to the 2011 census, its population was 332.

Ethnicity in 2011
Ethnicity	Number	Percentage
Albanians	330	99.4%
other/undeclared	2	0.6%
Total	332	100%
