= Lake Plav =

Lake in Montenegro

- Plavsko jezero / Плавско језеро Liqeni i Plavës
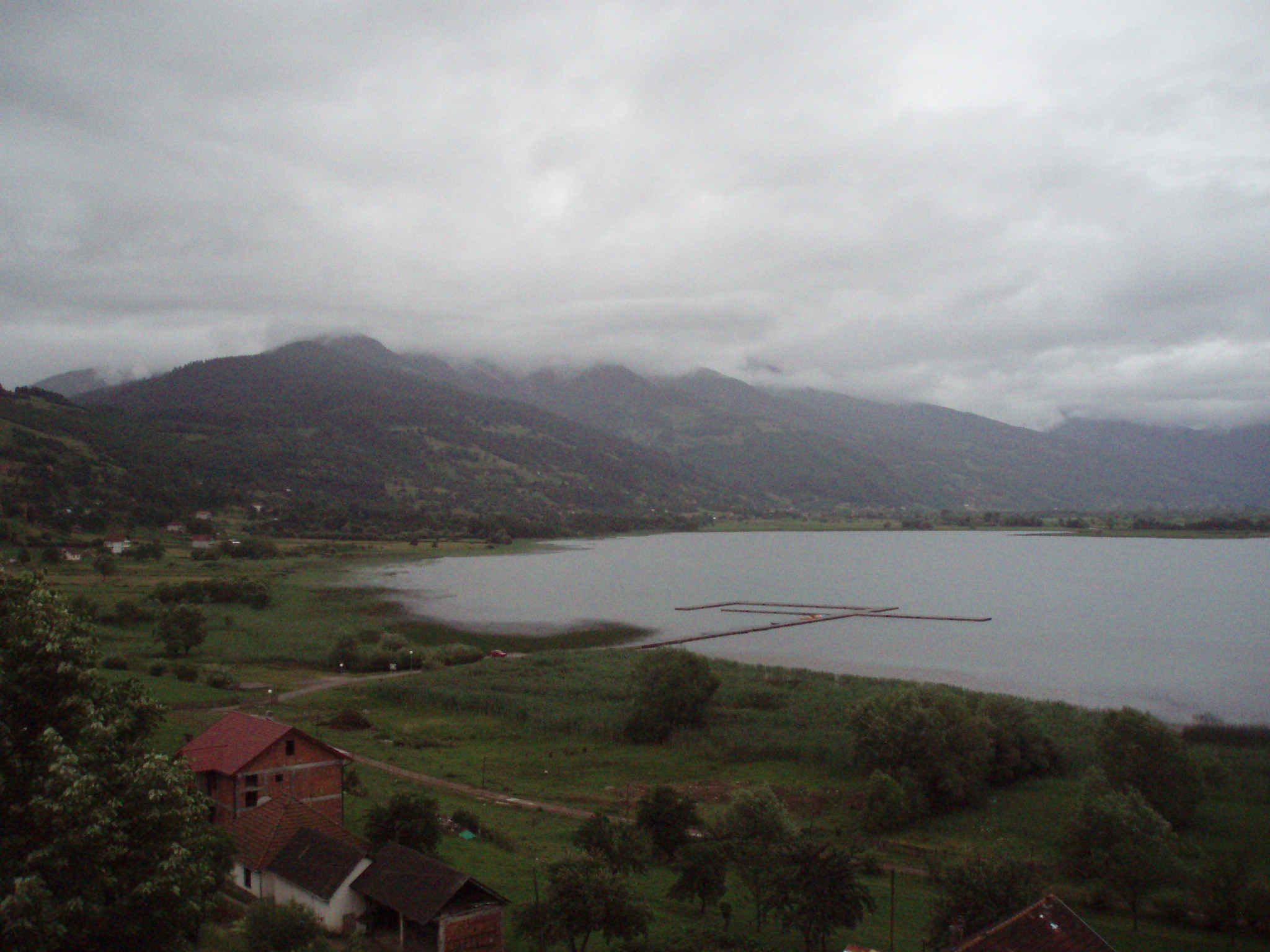

- Location of Lake Plav in Montenegro
- Location: Plav
- Coordinates: 42°35′45″N 19°55′30″E
- Primary outflows: Lim
- Basin countries: Montenegro
- Max. length: 2,160 m (7,090 ft)
- Surface area: 1.99 km^{2} (0.77 sq mi)
- Average depth: 9.1 m (30 ft)
- Max. depth: 9 m (30 ft)
- Surface elevation: 906 m (2,972 ft)

Lake Plav (Montenegrin: Плавско језеро, romanized: Plavsko jezero; Albanian: Liqeni i Plavës) is a lake in Plav Municipality, in northeastern Montenegro.

== About ==
It is a glacial lake located between the Accursed Mountains and Visitor mountain ranges at an altitude of 906 metres (2,972 ft) above sea level, and extends north–south for some 2,160 metres (7,090 ft). Its average width is 920 metres (3,020 ft), and its maximum depth is 9 meters (30 ft).

It is the largest glacial lake in Montenegro, and the best-known tourist attraction in the area.

The whole Plav region nestles at the foot of the towering Accursed Mountains range and rests on the banks of Lake Plav. The lake itself stretches from north to south for nearly a mile.

The lake is full of limestone caverns and there are many springs where water gushes forth from the earth.
