= List of Albanians in Montenegro =

This is a list of Albanians in Montenegro that includes both Montenegrin people of Albanian descent and Albanian immigrants that have resided in Montenegro. The list is sorted by the fields or occupations in which the notable individual has maintained the most influence.

For inclusion in this list, each individual must have a Wikipedia article indicating notability and show that they are Albanian and have lived in Montenegro.

== Politics ==
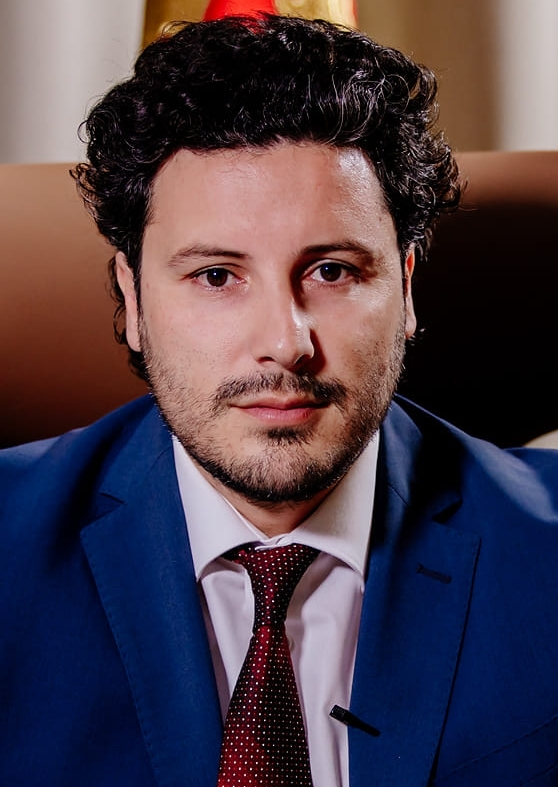
Dritan Abazović served as Prime Minister of Montenegro from 2022 to 2023.

- Daut Boriçi – Albanian politician
- Mirash Ivanaj – Albanian politician, minister and school director
- Lekë Lulgjuraj - Former Albanian politician
- Nikollë Ivanaj – Albanian journalist, publisher and writer
- Nik Gjeloshaj - Albanian politician, leader of Albanian Alternative and current Deputy Prime Minister of Montenegro
- Marash Dukaj - Albanian politician and current Minister of Public Administration of Montenegro
- Nikollë Camaj - Albanian politician, current Deputy Chairman of the Montenegrin Parliament
- Genci Nimanbegu - Albanian politician, leader of New Democratic Force (Montenegro)
- Mark Gjonaj – politician Democratic Party for District 80 in the New York State Assembly
- Dritan Abazović – Albanian Montenegrin politician, President of United Reform Action and current member of Parliament of Montenegro; current prime minister of Montenegro
- Gëzim Hajdinaga – Montenegrin-Albanian politician
- Fuad Nimani – Montenegrin-Albanian politician
- Nazif Cungu – Montenegrin-Albanian politician
- Liri Berisha – Albanian pediatrician

== Military ==
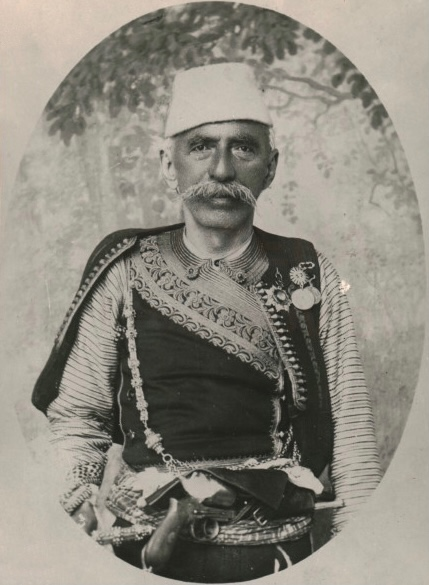
Ded Gjo Luli was a leadding nationalist during the Malissori uprising.

- Lika Ceni – Albanian pirate leader
- Ali Pasha of Gusinje – Albanian military commander and one of the leaders of the League of Prizren
- Mujo Ulqinaku – officer in the Royal Albanian Army and People's Hero of Albania
- Pretash Zekaj Ulaj – Albanian tribal leader
- Sulejman Pačariz – Islamic cleric and commander of the detachment of Muslim militia
- Ded Gjo Luli – (1840–1915) leading nationalists of the Albanian revolt against Turkey.
- Sokol Baci – Albanian leader in the liberation of Malesia from Ottoman rule.
- Baca Kurti Gjokaj – Albanian nationalist
- Cel Shabani – Albanian commander of the Albanian forces of the League of Prizren in 1879
- Jakup Ferri – Leader of Albanian irregulars from Plav and member of the nationalist Albanian League of Prizren
- Tringe Smajli – Albanian guerrilla fighter who fought against the Ottoman Empire in the Malësia region
- Çun Mula – Albanian freedom fighter
- Cafo Beg Ulqini – Albanian nationalist

== Science and academia ==
- Nikolla bey Ivanaj – Albanian journalist, publisher and writer
- Hajro Ulqinaku – Albanian writer
- Esad Mekuli – Albanian poet and scholar
- Simon Filipaj – Albanian Catholic priest, theologian and translator of the Bible
- Gjelosh Gjokaj – Albanian painter, and graphic artist.
- Nokë Sinishtaj – Albanian writer and poet
- Zuvdija Hodžić - Albanian writer
- Ćamil Sijarić – Montenegrin novelist and short story writer
- Rexhep Qosja – prominent Albanian academic (lives in Kosovo)
- Martin Berishaj - Albanian political scientist, current ambassador of Kosovo to Croatia
- Nikollë Berishaj - Prominent translator, literary critic and author
- Mehmet Kraja – Albanian writer, literary critic and journalist
- Anton K. Berishaj - Albanian sociologist and University Professor
- Palokë Berisha - Albanian scholar and University Professor
- Isuf Dedushaj – Albanian epidemiologist
- Fran Camaj - Albanian novelist
- Pashko R. Camaj - Albanian-American scholar
- Mark Lucgjonaj – Albanian writer and ethnologist
- Anton Gojçaj - Albanian writer
- Klement Camaj - Albanian scholar
- Albert Bikaj - Albanian scholar and translator

== Musicians ==
- Kristine Elezaj – Albanian-American recording artist
- Malësor Prenkoçaj – Albanian singer
- Adrian Lulgjuraj – Albanian singer, winner of the Festivali i Këngës 51.
- Nikollë Nikprelaj – Albanian singer
- Rexho Mulliqi – Albanian composer
- Enisa Nikaj - Albanian-American pop singer
- Toni Ujkaj - Albanian singer
- Edita Abdieski – Swiss pop singer
- Ledri Vula – Albanian rapper, singer and songwriter
- David Dreshaj – Albanian singer

== Models ==
- Afërdita Dreshaj – Albanian model
- Emina Cunmulaj – Albanian-American model

== Cinema ==
- Nickola Shreli – Albanian-American actor
- Victor Gojcaj – Albanian-American actor
- Yllka Mujo – Albanian actress
- Pjetër Gjoka – actor and People's Artist of Albania
- Pjeter Malota – Albanian actor, martial artist.
- Enver Gjokaj – Albanian-American actor

== Religion ==
- Gjon Buzuku – Albanian Catholic priest who wrote the first known printed book in the Albanian language: Meshari
- Simon Filipaj – Albanian Catholic priest, theologian and translator of the Bible
- Rrok Mirdita – Catholic Archbishop of Durrës-Tirana, and the Primate of Albania
- Vinçenc Malaj OFM - Albanian Catholic priest, historian and ethnologist
- Zef Tagaj OFM - Albanian Catholic priest, martyr
- Pashko Gojçaj OFM - Albanian Catholic priest and provincial of the Franciscan Mission in Albania and Montenegro
- Rexhep Lika - Albanian Imam

== Sports ==
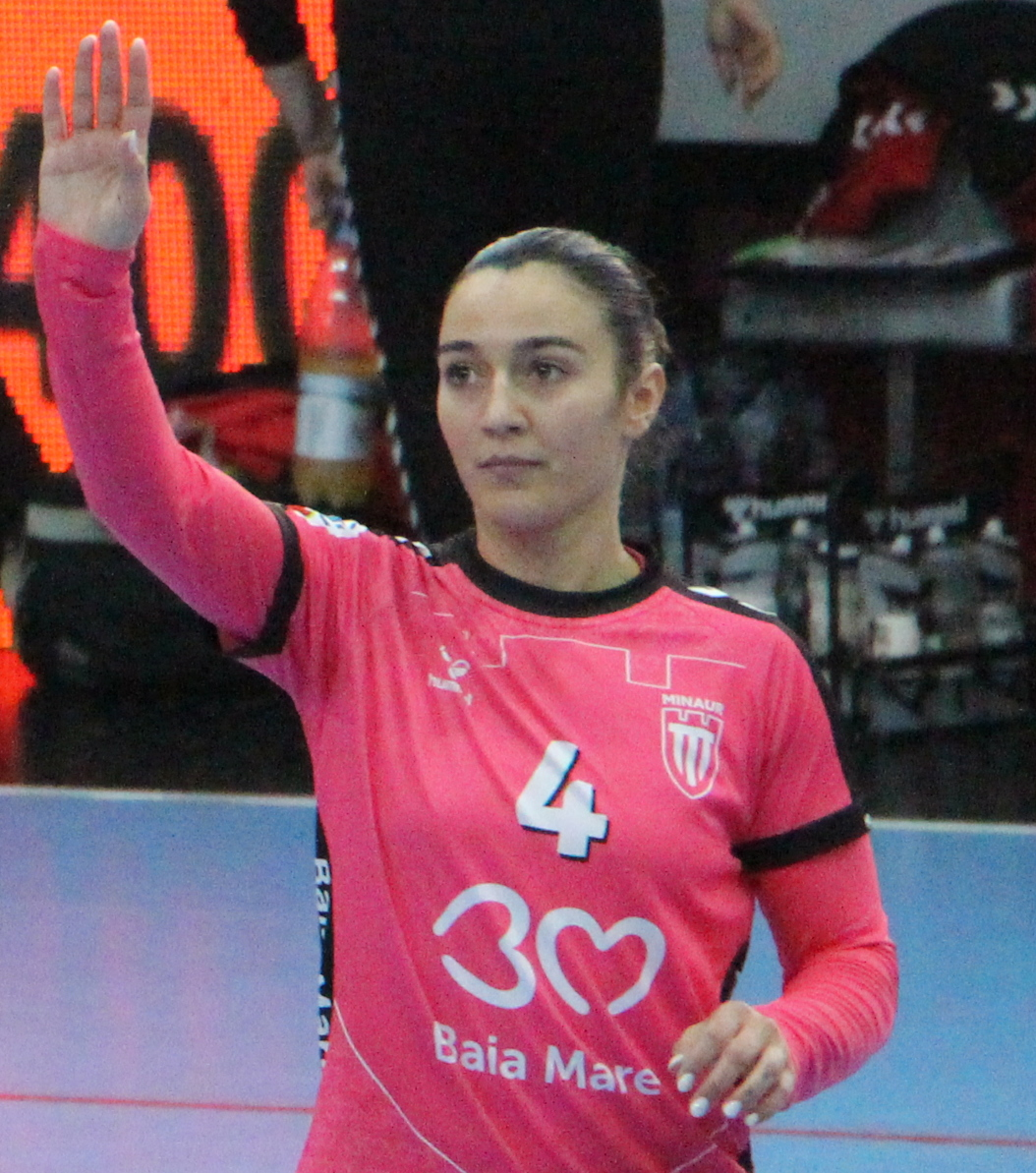
Dijana Ujkić is a handball player who is currently competing for the Montenegrin national team

- Lesh Shkreli – football player
- Ardian Đokaj – football player
- Fatos Beqiraj – football player
- Sead Hakšabanović – football player
- Emrah Klimenta – football player
- Edvin Kuč – football player
- Ronaldo Rudović – football player
- Halil Kanacević – American-born Montenegrin professional basketball player
- Arijanet Muric – football player
- Ibrahim Drešević – football player
- Driton Camaj – football player
- Aljbino Camaj – football player
- Mirnes Pepić – football player
- Idriz Toskić – football player
- Aldin Adžović – football player
- Ermin Seratlić – football player
- Samir Shaptahoviç – former Kosovo Albanian professional basketball player, who last played for KB Peja
- Dijana Ujkić – Montenegrin handball player
- Kristijan Vulaj – football player
- Ema Ramusović – Montenegrin handball player
- Alija Krnić – football player
- Amin Hot – basketball player
