= Gruda (tribe) =

Historic Albanian tribe

Coordinates: 42°24′N 19°21′E

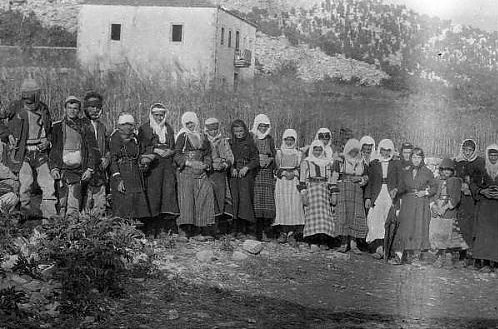
Gruda Albanians, 1913.

Gruda is a Northern Albanian tribe and historical tribal region in southeastern Montenegro, just north of Lake Skadar, which includes the small town of Tuzi, near Podgorica. It is inhabited by a majority of ethnic Albanians.

== Geography ==
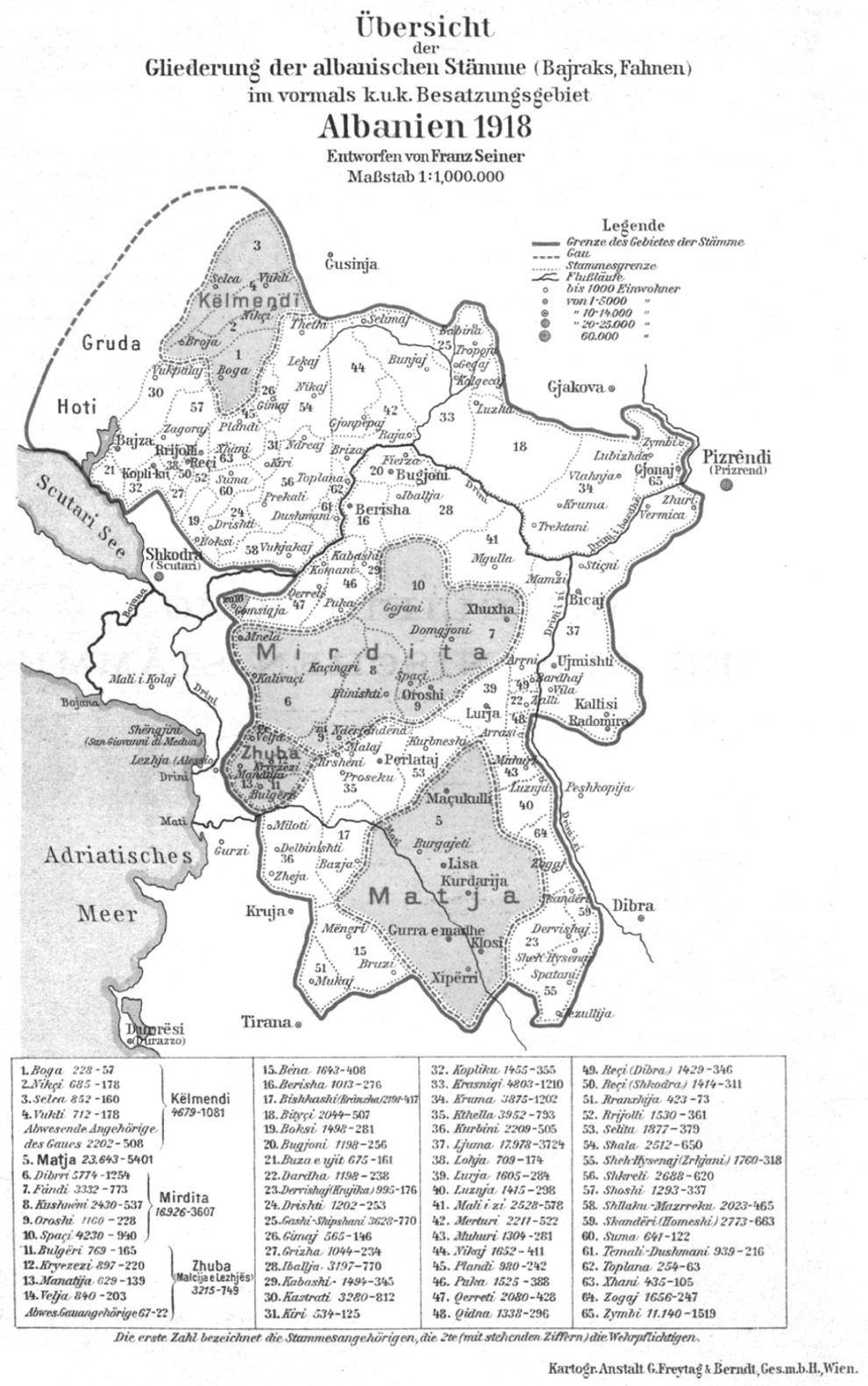
Albanian bayraks as of 1918. Gruda and Hoti on the far left side.

Gruda is an Albanian historical tribal region within Montenegro, along the mountainous border with Albania, east of Podgorica. It borders to the historical tribal regions of Hoti and Kelmendi to the south and east (in Southern Montenegro and Northern Albania), and Slavic regions to the north.

The historical Gruda tribal region, as described by A. Jovićević (1923), include the following settlements:

- Settlements on the right bank of Cemi :
  - Dinoša / Dinoshë
  - Lovka / Llofkë
  - Pikalj / Pikalë
  - Prifti / Prift
  - Selišta / Selishtë
    - Gornja Selišta / Selishtë e Epërme
    - Donja Selišta / Selishtë e Poshtme
- Settlements on the left bank of Cemi :
  - Gurec / Gurrec
  - Kaljaj / Kalaj
  - Krševo / Kshevë
  - Milješ / Milesh
    - Gornji Milješ / Mileshi i Epërm
    - Donji Milješ / Mileshi i Poshtëm
  - Paškala / Passhkallë
  - Vuljevići / Vulaj
    - Gornji Vuljevići / Vulaj i Epërm

In the western half of Gruda lies the small mountain range of Dečić/Deçiq, as well as the river, which runs through Gruda, separating Dečić/Deçiq and the village of Suka, as well as forming the border between the lands of the Gruda tribe and those of Kuči. Dečić/Deçiq and Suka being the largest mountains in Gruda.

== History ==
In 1485, Gruda was recorded as a nahiye in the Ottoman administration. In 1499, Hoti and Gruda rose against the Ottoman demands for taxes and conscripts. It was also involved in a series of revolts in the 17th century, often together with the Malësian tribes.

In Mariano Bolizza's 1614 report and description of the Sanjak of Scutari, Gruda had 40 households and 100 soldiers. The Old Kuči constantly were in conflict with the Old Gruda; the Kuči were stronger, thus they stole livestock from Gruda, and if only one Kuči would be killed in conflicts, and several Gruda, they would penalize the whole tribe. In 1658, the seven tribes of Kuči, Vasojevići, Bratonožići, Piperi, Kelmendi, Hoti and Gruda allied themselves with the Republic of Venice, establishing the so-called "Seven-fold barjak" or "alaj-barjak", against the Ottomans.

Gruda proved to be a focus of conflict between Ottoman Empire and Montenegro during the 1880s. During border negotiations Italy suggested in April 1880 for the Ottoman Empire to give Montenegro the Tuz district that contained mainly Catholic Gruda and Hoti populations which would have left the tribes split between both countries. The tribes affected by the negotiations swore a besa (pledge) to resist any reduction of their lands and sent telegrams to surrounding regions for military assistance. The Porte insisted that in upcoming treaty to cede Ulcinj to Montenegro, Gruda be left to Albanians. During the same time, Porte's representative, Riza Pasha was turning a blind eye to the preparations of Albanian League for resistance against the upcoming Montenegrin occupation.

According to Baron Franz Nopcsa, Gruda was a primarily Catholic tribe with a population of ca. 7,000 in 1907. Having been forced to disarm, and under considerable pressure by the Ottomans to convert to Islam, (and not having staged any major revolt against Ottoman authority for nearly a half century) the Albanian highlanders launched a guerrilla campaign against the occupying armies. The Gruda tribe was instrumental in Ottoman resistance in the region.

The mountains north-east of Tuzi are remembered as the site of a major uprising against the Ottomans in 1911 which was among the first significant steps toward Albanian independence and probably the most distinguishing moment of the northern Albanian resistance. In 1911, under the leadership of Sokol Baci, Albanian guerrillas launched a major assault against the strategic high ground of Mount Deçiq. The force is said to have taken about eighty casualties, but they ultimately prevailed, and planted the Albanian flag at the crest of the hill (the first time the flag had been raised in the country since 1469). This symbolic act represented a major sign of the Ottoman Empire's crumbling rule over the Balkans, and it cemented Gruda's reputation among the other ethnic Albanian tribes. On 23 June 1911 Albanian tribesmen and other revolutionaries gathered in Montenegro and drafted the Greçë Memorandum demanding Albanian sociopolitical and linguistic rights with four of the signatories being from Gruda. In later negotiations with the Ottomans, an amnesty was granted to the tribesmen with promises by the government to build one to two primary schools in the nahiye of Gruda and pay the wages of teachers allocated to them.

In 1913, the Great Powers at the Conference of London awarded Gruda and Hoti to Montenegro, thus cutting them off from the rest of Albania and from other Albanian highland tribes. Montenegrin forces invaded Gruda territory in the spring on 30 and 31 may, with many dead and injured. In July 1913, emissaries of Prince Nikola of Montenegro offered tribal leaders money and grain supplies to win them over to Montenegro, but they refused. As a reaction to the Montenegrin occupation of Tuzi in 1913, Gruda sent a large deputation to Vice admiral Sir Cecil Burney, to convey him their resolve not to submit to Montenegro. Border skirmishes, and fighting, continued over the next six months and, by 1914, the Montenegrin government announced its military occupation of Gruda and Hoti. Most of the settlements in Gruda were razed to the ground by the Montenegrin army. The surviving population some 700 families from Gruda and Hori, Fled to Kastrati. Part of the population emigrated in 1914 on the plain of north of Shkodra, forming the settlement of Gruda e Re (New Gruda)

The city of Tuzi lies in the east end of Gruda. Of Tuzi's 3,789 residents, more than 2,000 are ethnic Albanians, making it, according to the 2003 census, the heaviest concentration of ethnic Albanians in Malësia. Over the last 30 years there has been a minor influx from the surrounding villages of Albanians who are looking to take advantage of Tuzi's higher standard of living and better educational system.

== Ethnography ==
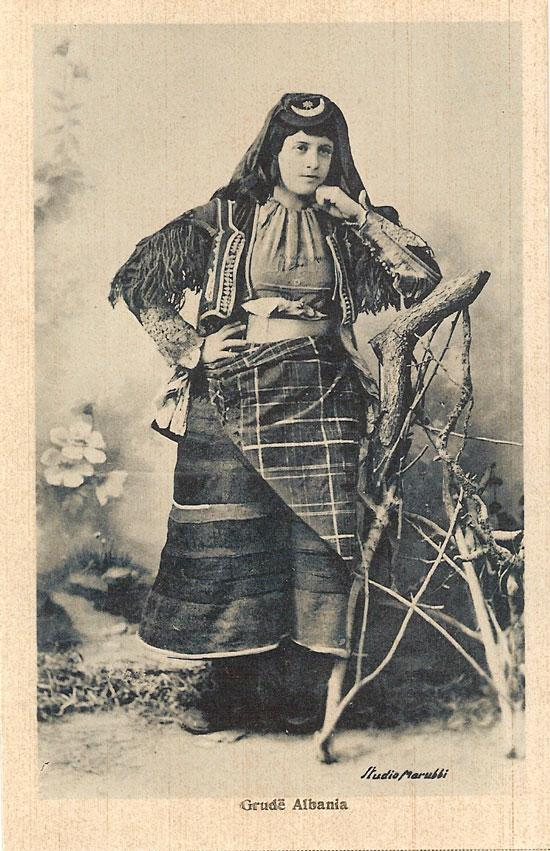
Woman photographed by Marubi.

In the late Ottoman period, the tribe of Gruda consisted of 225 Catholic and 225 Muslim households. Unlike other Albanian tribes who practised endogamy by intermarrying within their group, the Gruda allowed marriage with members of other tribes. The tribe of Gruda is divided into two clans, the Vuksangelaj/Vuksangeljići and the Berishaj/Berišići.

Vuksangelaj

According to Andrija Jovićević, there exist different accounts regarding the origins of the Vuksangelaj family, among which he only provides three:

- The first account describes the founder of the Vuksangelaj as Vuksan, who migrated from Suma near Shkodra to Gruda. Vuksan had three sons - Iveza, Nik and Vuc, from whom descend the Ivezaj, Nikaj and Vucoki, respectively.
- The second account describes the founder of the Vuksangelaj as Grud Suma, who migrated from Suma near Pult. Grud Suma initially settled in Geljina Shkala near Pikalë. Grud had three sons - Gjon, Ban and Jul. Gjon Gruda had one son, Gel Gjona. Gel Gjona had two sons - Vuksan Gela and Vuçin Gela. Vuksan Gela had four sons - Iveza, Nogza, Nik and Vuc, of which descend the Ivezaj, Sinishtaj, Nikaj and Vucoki, respectively. Vuçin Gela had one son, from whom stem the Vuçinaj. Several members of the Vuçinaj family later migrated to Nikšić. From Ban Gruda descend the Lulgjuraj family. From Jul Gruda descend the Vulaj family.
- The third account describes the founder of the Vuksangelaj as Gjon Suma. Gjon Suma escaped the village of Suma due to a blood feud (gjakmarrje), and settled in the aforementioned Geljina Shkala. Gjon Suma had three sons - Gel, Pal and Sokol. Gel remained in Geljina Shkala. Pal initially moved to Bregviza near the Cijevna, and then to Lovka. Sokol migrated to Shkodër, where he converted to Islam. From Sokol descend the Sokolli in Shkodër. Gel Suma had two sons - Vuksan Gela and Vuçin Gela. Vuksan Gela had four sons - Iveza, Dok, Nik and Vuk, from whom descend the Ivezaj, Gjolaj, Nikaj and Sinishtaj, respectively. From Vuçin Gela stem the Vuçinaj.

Berishaj

The Berishaj family descends from an individual named Priftaj. Priftaj was originally from Shalë who immigrated to Gruda and inhabited a village that now carries his name - Prifti. After arriving in Prifti, he discovered several native villagers from the Tihomir family. Priftaj was Catholic, while the Tihomiri were Orthodox. The Tihomir family later relocated to Orahovo in Kuči, leaving the Berishaj family as the sole inhabitants of the village.

=== Families ===
Among brotherhoods (vëllazëri) in the village are: Ivezaj/Ivezić, Nikaj/Nikić, Gjokaj/Đokić, Gjolaj/Đoljić, Sinishtaj/Siništović, Kalaj/Kaljić, Lulgjuraj/Ljuljđurović, Berishaj/Berišić, Vuçinaj/Vučinić, Bojaj/Bojić, Vulaj/Vuljić, Stanaj/Stanić. The following are Islamic converts of the last names above: Lulanaj/Ljuljanović, Kajoshaj/Kajošević, BeqajBećić, Kërnaj/Krnić, Pepaj/Pepić, Hakshabanaj/Hakšabanović, Gilaj/Giljić, Pecaj/Pecić and Fërluçkaj/Frljučkić. The surnames found in Gruda include:

- Beqaj/Bećić
- Berishaj/Berišić
- Bojaj/Bojić
- Dukaj/Dukić
- Gjokaj/Đokić
- Gjolaj/Đolić
- Hakshabanaj/Hakšabanović
- Ivezaj/Ivezić
  - Grimaj/Grimić, descend from Grim Deda Ivezaj
  - Pepaj/Pepić, descend from Pep Gjona Ivezaj
- Gilaj/Giljić
- Hakaj/Kakić
- Haxhaj/Hadžić
- Kalaj/Kaljić
  - Sukaj/Sukić (Suka)
- Kajoshaj/Kajošević
- Kërnaj/Krnić
- Lulanaj/Ljuljanović
- Lulgjuraj/Ljuljđurović
  - Fërluçkaj/Frljučkić
  - Krkanaj/Krkanović
  - Pecaj/Pecić
- Neziraj/Nezirović
- Nikaj/Nikić
  - Lekaj/Ljekić
- Sinishtaj/Siništović
- Stanaj/Stanić, related to Vulaj/Vuljić
- Vuçinaj/Vučinić
- Vulaj/Vuljić, related to Stanaj/Stanić

=== Religion ===
Gruda was initially entirely Roman Catholic. Due to Ottoman Turkish influence, many families converted into Islam. While Catholics form a majority in most settlements in Gruda, Muslims form a majority in Adžovići, Dinoša and Milješ.

The Gruda Church (Kisha e Grudës), built in 1528, dedicated to St. Michael, is located in the town of Milesh, not only an Albanian cultural landmark, its construction provides the most concrete reference date from which ethnic Albanians in the area trace their ancestry.

== Notable people ==
Born in Gruda

- Baca Kurti (1807–1881), chief of Gruda, of the Gjokaj brotherhood
- Sokol Baci (1837–1919), chief of Gruda, of the Ivezaj brotherhood
- Tringe Smajli (fl. 1870–1917), dubbed "Albanian Joan of Arc", of the Ivezaj brotherhood
- Smajl Martini (fl. 1878–86), flag-bearer of Gruda, of the Ivezaj brotherhood
- Nokë Sinishtaj, Albanian writer, born in Kshevë
- Pjeter Malota, Albanian actor, born in Lovka
- Tom Berisha Military General

Franjo Lulgjuraj, Yugoslav official, mayor of Tuzi Gjelosh Gjokaj Artist Dr Anton K Berisha Akademic

By descent

- Adrian Lulgjuraj, Albanian musician, by paternal descent.
- Arjan Beqaj, former Albanian professional footballer.
- Xhevahir Sukaj, Albanian professional footballer.
- Sead Hakšabanović, Montenegrin professional footballer.
- Albert Stanaj, Albanian musician by parental descent
- Yılmaz Gruda, Turkish actor and poet.
- Brajan Gruda, German footballer.
- Ildi Gruda, Albanian footballer.
