= Međa =

Međa (meaning border) may refer to the following places:

- Međa, Croatia, a village in the municipality of Sveti Petar Orehovec, Croatia
- Međa (Leskovac), a village in Serbia
- Međa (Žitište), a village in Serbia

== See also ==
- Međa Vuka manitoga, a border wall in Montenegro
- Medjå, a village in Grong, Norway
