= Rakića Kuće =

Rakića Kuće Ракића Куће Rakiq
- Village
- Location within Montenegro
- Coordinates: 42.388330°N 19.280115°E
- Country: Montenegro
- Municipality: Tuzi

Population (2011)
  - Total: 279
- Time zone: UTC+1 (CET)
  - Summer (DST): UTC+2 (CEST)

Rakića Kuće (Serbian Cyrillic: Ракића Куће; Albanian: Rakiq) is a village in the municipality of Tuzi, Montenegro. It is located halfway between Tuzi and Podgorica.

== Demographics ==
According to the 2011 census, its population was 279.

Ethnicity in 2011
Ethnicity	Number	Percentage
Albanians	143	51.3%
Serbs	38	13.6%
Bosniaks	30	10.8%
Montenegrins	29	10.4%
other/undeclared	39	14.0%
Total	279	100%
