= Gjelosh Gjokaj =

Albanian painter

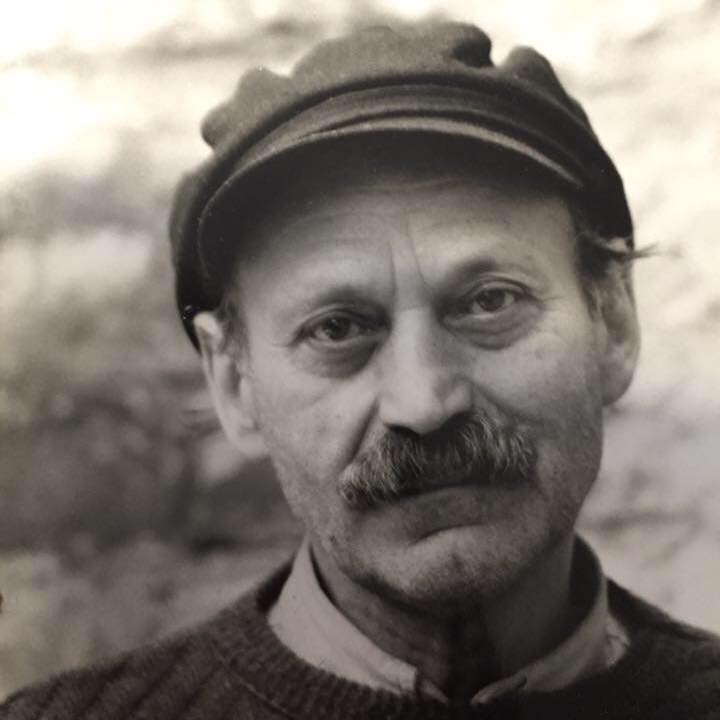
- Born: July 25, 1933; Gornji Milješ, Tuzi, Montenegro
- Died: September 26, 2016 (aged 83); Augsburg, Germany
- Education: University of Arts in Belgrade
- Occupation: Artist

Gjelosh Gjokaj (July 25, 1933 – September 26, 2016) was an artist from Montenegro. An ethnic Albanian, he was born in the village of Gornji Milješ (Alb: Gornji Milesh) in Tuzi. After receiving his fine arts degree from the University of Arts in Belgrade in 1963, he proceeded to become part of the faculty until 1969. He later immigrated to Rome, Italy, where he lived and worked until 1983. He was able to leave his mark worldwide with over 45 international solo exhibits and well over 70 group shows. In 1983, he made Augsburg, Germany his primary residence until his death in 2016. He is referred as "father of graphic arts of Kosovo".

== Gallery ==
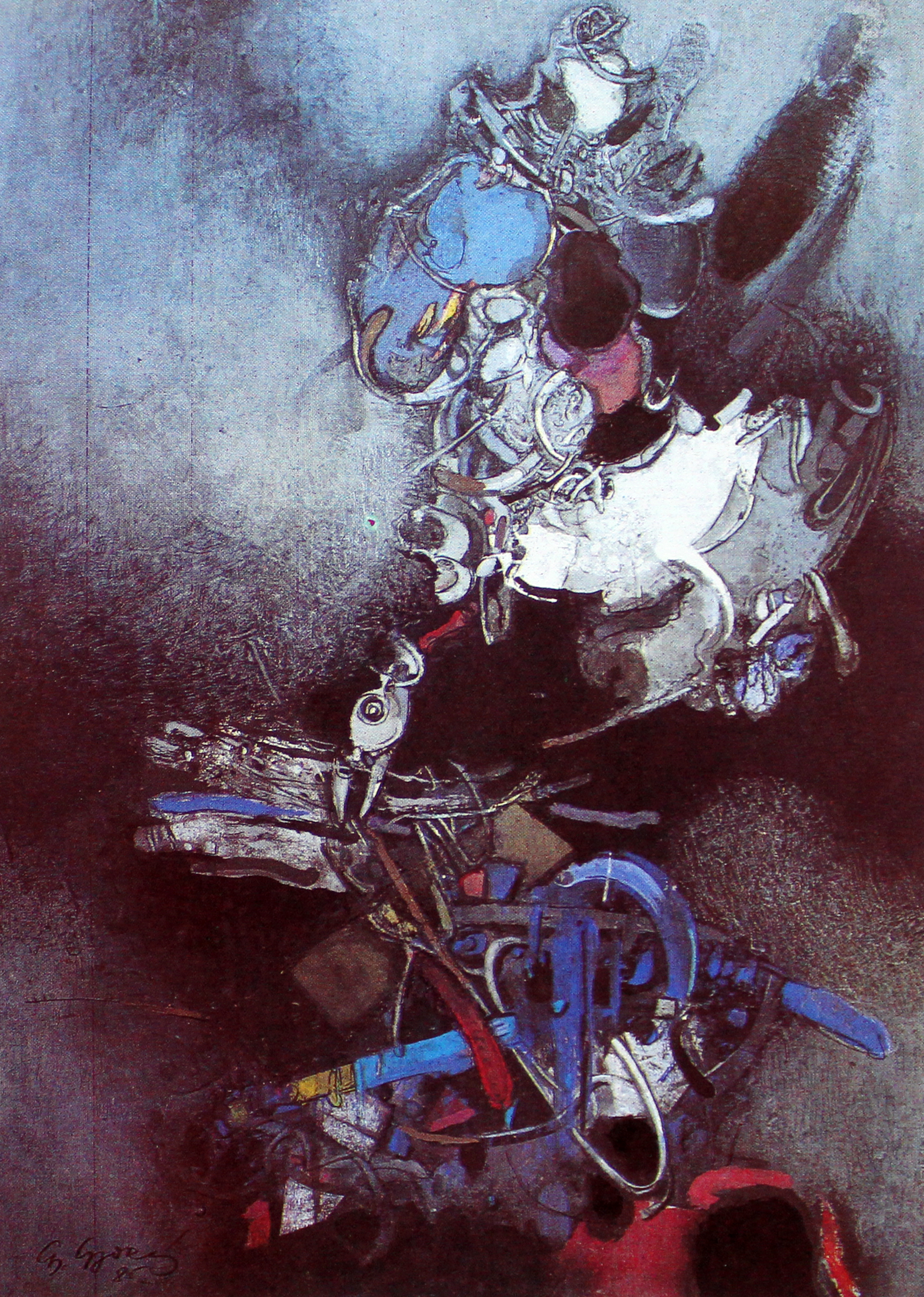

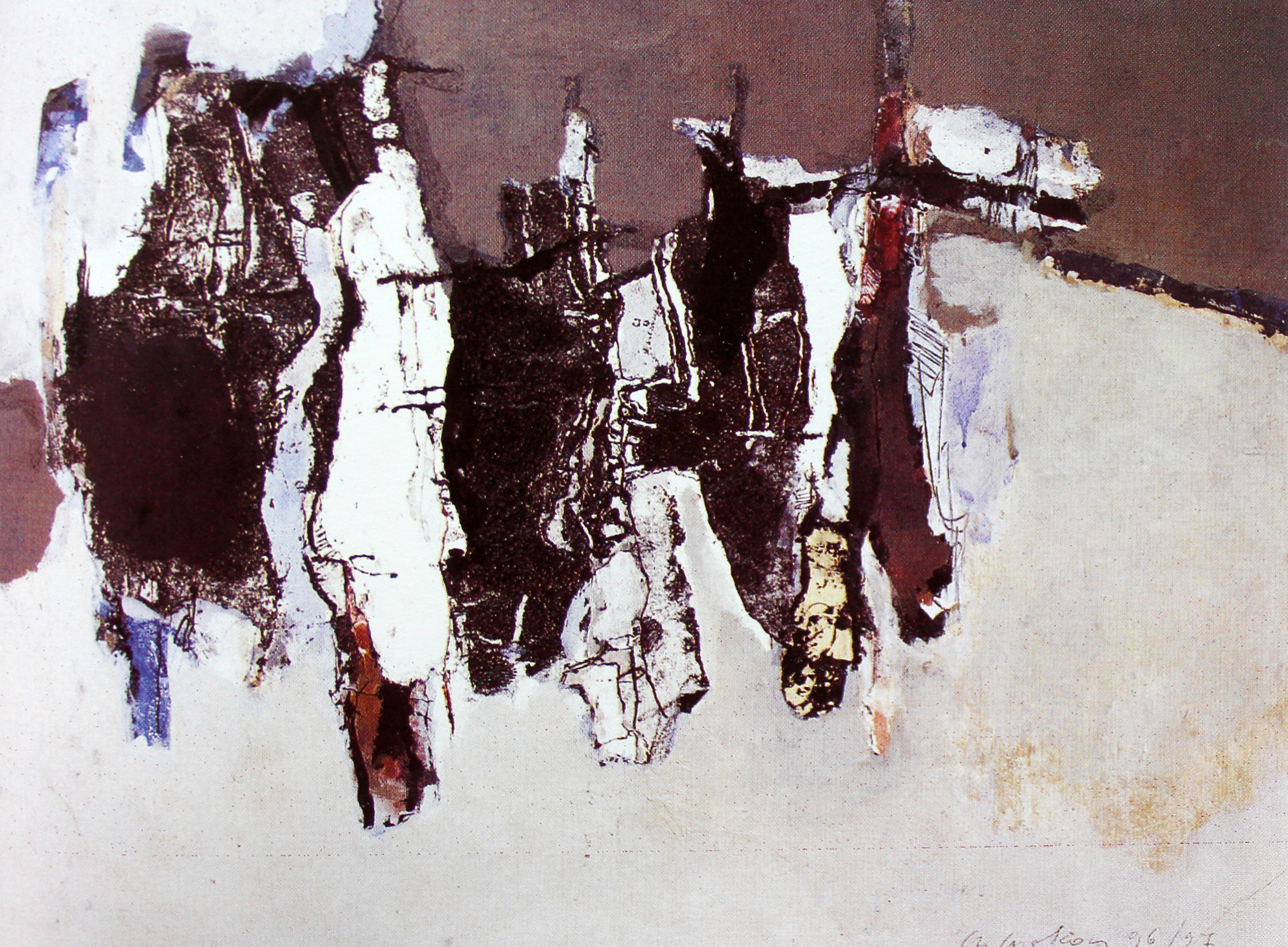
