= Nokë Sinishtaj =

Albanian poet and priest

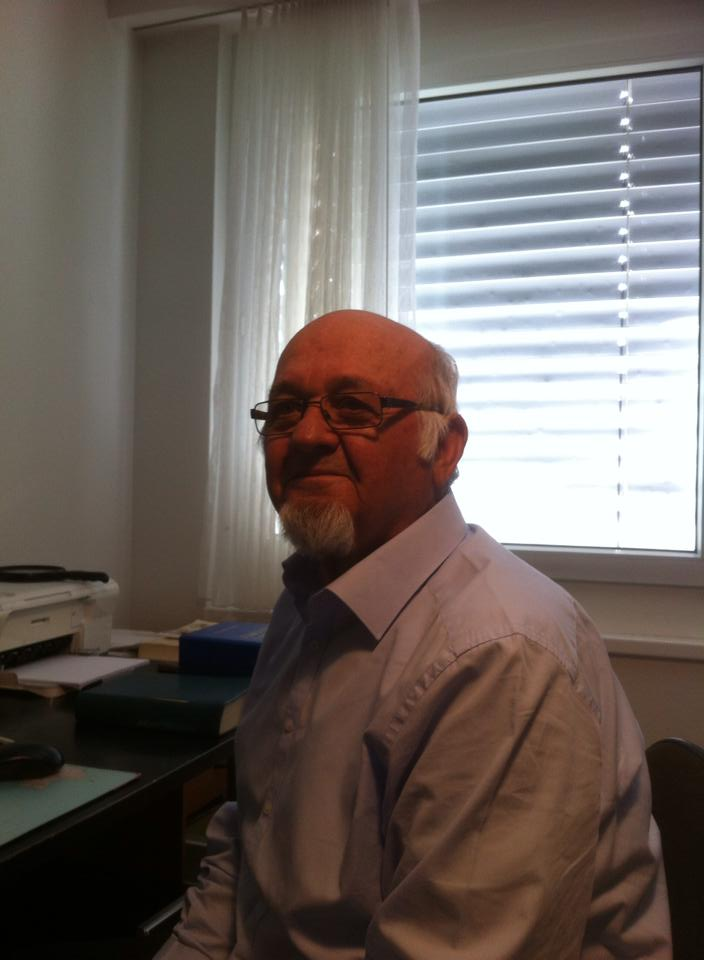
- Nokë Sinishtaj
- Born: August 24, 1944 (age 82); Krševo, German-occupied Montenegro
- Died: 15.05.2021; Luzern
- Resting place: Luzern
- Citizenship: Swiss, Montenegrin
- Education: Catholic theology
- Alma mater: University of Zagreb; University of Florence
- Occupations: Poet, writer, translator, teacher
- Relatives: Mark Lucgjonaj (nephew)
- Writing career
- Pen name: Antonio Sinishtaj, Ndue Sinishtaj
- Language: Gheg Albanian, Serbo-Croatian, German, Italian, Latin
- Period: Post-modernism
- Genre: Poetry
- Notable work: Rrefimet e një prifti të rebeluar

Ndue Sinishtaj (August 24, 1944) was an Albanian poet, and former Catholic priest from Montenegro known for writing poems in Gheg Albanian.

== Early life ==
Sinishtaj was born in Krševo (Albanian: Këshevë), an Albanian village in the Gruda region near Podgorica, at the time part of Yugoslavia, but now part of Montenegro. He was given his nickname, Nokë, by his family. He hails from the Shytaj brotherhood, a large family which numbered about 60 members, all living together in a big house known as the tower of Shytaj. He is the fourth of thirteen children in the Sinishtaj family. As pastoralism was the family occupation and means of survival, he was a shepherd as a child.

He attended elementary school in Tuzi taught by teachers who spoke the Gheg dialect. He continued his education in the city of Zadar and finished classic high school in Pazinit. He studied theology at schools in the Balkan cities of Zagreb and Rijeka finally moving to Florence, Italy where he graduated in theology.

== Intellectual formation ==
For Nokë and his family, it was a great honor to be nominated as a Catholic priest and return to Malësia. For five years, Sinishtaj served as a priest in Gusinje, Tuzi, and Hoti. While serving as a priest, he was known for his oratorical skills preaching in church. However, after five years, he left the priesthood to start a family with whom he lives today in Switzerland.

In 2000, many years after leaving the priesthood, he published a book which was both an autobiographical diary and a confession to justify his decision. The book was entitled Confessions of a Rebellious Priest. In this book Sinishtaj recounts the problems he encountered as a priest. It was because of these events, including hostile behavior, and injustices inside the clergy, that caused him to finally leave the priesthood but not his faith in God.

However he did not stop studying and in 1975 continued his education in Philosophy and Italian Literature at the University of Fribourg, graduating in 1981. He is currently working as a translator at the Court of Lucerne. He is a polyglot, speaking: Albanian, Serbo-Croatian, Latin, German, and Italian.

== Works ==
Works in Albanian :

- Mogilat e Kshevës” (1976)
- Te varret e Kshevës (At Ksheva graves), poem (1976)
- Syri i ngujuar (Confined eye), poem (1998)
- Në vend të epitafit (Instead of the epitaph), poem (2002)
- I vetmuar, në kopshtin tim, qaj për të afërmit e mi (Alone in my garden, crying over my family), (2002)
- Spirale (Spirals), poem (2003)
- Rekuiem për fshatin tim (Requiem to my village), poem (2005)
- Tetë letra të Martin Camajt (Eight letters of Martin Camaj), (2000)
- Nga sergjeni i harruar (From the forgotten shelf), poem (2007)
- Rrefimet e një prifti të rebeluar (Tales of a rebelled priest), (2000)
- Kupa e thyer e heshtjes (The broken glass of silence), poem (2010)
- Nën arkada të universit (Under the arcade of the universe), poem (2013)

Works in Croatian :

- More mira u nemiru (The sea of quitenes in unquietitude ), poem (1974)
- Nerastočeni mir (Nerastoceni peace), poem (1974)
- Dubrovnik (Dubrovnik), poem (1974)
- Apokalipsa Paška s Prokletia (Apocalypse of Paško from Prokletia), novel (1977)

Works in Italian

- Rimani amica (Stay friend), poem (1977)

Work in German

- Eingewickelt in sein Schweisstuch (Wrapped in his sweat cloth), poem (1994)
