= Culture of Deçan =

The culture of the town of Deçan in Kosovo is an important part of rural traditional Albanian culture.

== Life rites ==
=== Weddings ===
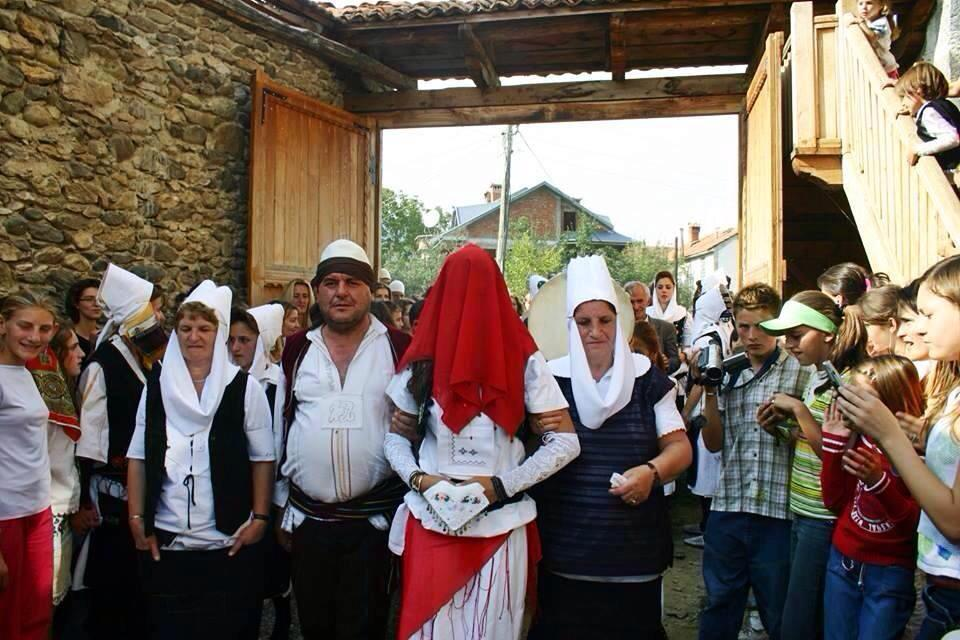
Traditional Albanian wedding

In the past, weddings lasted three days; however, they began in the sense of initiating necessary preparations. Several days before, washing and cleaning along with similar preparations would begin. They included white-washing the walls of the house, cutting the wood and having all the necessary things ready. Three days before the wedding, the man of the house (zoti shpisë) would invite his kinfolks to discuss who should be invited to the wedding. Apart from the people who would make the invitations, others were appointed to serve in the wedding. The following day, the people involved, which included friends, family, relatives, and women in the house would continue the preparations of various dishes such as cleaning the wheat for the "qyshkek" (boiled grain in sugar), which marked the beginning of the wedding. Women and girls from the village would aid in laying the dining tables in the courtyard and would begin cleaning the wheat on them early in the mornings for three continuous days. During these days, celebrations would begin; the females would take up tambourines or baking pans, along with singing and dancing, while the wheat was being cleaned up grain by grain. On the wedding day, people would come to congratulate the family early in the morning, whereas in the evening, only those who were invited to the wedding would show up. The guests would bring presents with them for the couple; usually the women would bring pies, and the men, two kilograms of sugar. Among the men, various songs were sung with the cifteli and lute (traditional Albanian instruments) while comedic acts were played on one another. Among the women, two tambourine players would sing rhythmical songs to which women would dance. Once the dinner that would have been prepared by a cook would have been served and eaten, the guests would be sent to sleep.

On the wedding day, the guests would be served an early lunch so they would be ready in time to take the bride from her house. The first to make their way to the wedding would be the women and the dowry cart and the men would set off half an hour later. Upon their journey to and from the bride's house and back to the groom's house, the guests would throw cigarettes to the people they would meet in a sign of respect. The guests would arrive in pairs, coming from opposite directions; however, the earlier custom was for one side to stop and unbridle the horses first to leave space for the other side to pass who would be all led by the banner-holder. The individual who would hold the banner was usually from the groom's side of close relatives. While the bride would leave her village, she would keep her face down in a sign of pain that she was leaving her birth village. As the bride and her guests would approach the wedding house (groom's house), the groom's side would await them with tambourines. The first to enter the courtyard would be the bride's car, which would stop there for her to come out, followed by the dowry car and other guests at the end. While this would happen, an elderly man would throw corn and grains mixed with beans, coins, and sugar squares upon the bride's car and guests. This ritual would be performed so that the bride would enter the courtyard with "abundance". The man of the house would grab the bride by her shoulder, take her off the carriage and take her to the standing place. The bride would have to step with the right foot first and walk on wheat grain, metal things and coins which belonged to the man of the house and which had all been laid down prior to her coming. The groom would stand facing the bride while they attempted to look at each other. However, prior to the bride's entrance, her fingers would be dipped in honey and sorbet and, upon entering, she would wet the upper threshold of the door with her fingers so that she would have a pleasant life in her new house. After dinner, the women would select the best items from the dowry the bride had brought with her so that they would be worn for the groom. Finally, the groom would make his way into the bedroom, while the bride would stand and wait for him. Before entering the room, the groom would salute his parents and would be followed by youth who would award him with pats on his back.

The next day, the bride had her head tied with a head wrap and was brought out to the courtyard while a boy led her to the well. The bride would get a bucket of water from the well with the boy and they would help each other wash their hands. After the wedding, the bride would become a part of the family and within the week, her father-in-law would take her and go to spend a night at her parents' house. After a month, the bride's family would take her to spend a week with them where she would bring them food consisting of two loaves of bread and pies; the same food would be brought back to the groom's house and the pie is shared with everyone on the street.

=== Engagement ===
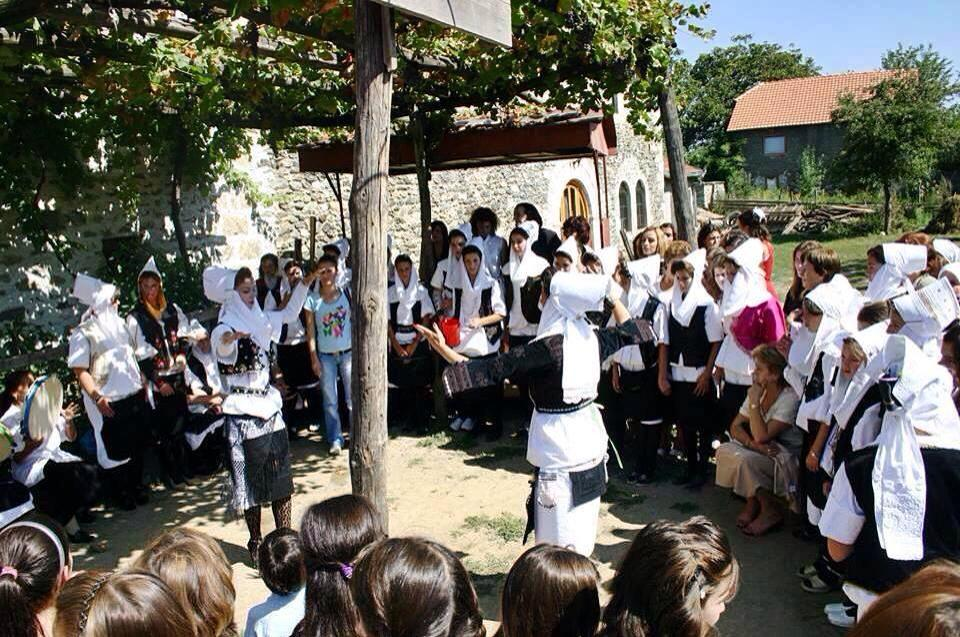
A traditional wedding day at the brides home

The engagement is an important act leading to the marriage life. Marriage among Albanians was always considered holy and consequently, the wish for a happy married life was enormous. From a very young age, lullabies encouraged children to get married and have a big wedding with a beautiful bride or a good husband. Engagements today happen when two young people know and love each other. When they decide to get engaged, the ceremony takes place according to tradition. In the past, the engagements were done at a very young age or they were arranged prior to birth; this was caused by poor education and patriarchal life. The age of partners had no importance and earlier association between the engaged was not even considered. The engagement took place through a mediator who often, having set the engagement, left with an award by the groom's family. From that day, the girl's family begins to take an interest on the groom and his family; both parts are interested on the relatives of the girl and the boy. If the father does not want to engage his daughter to that house, he argues that his daughter is still young or that she is not suitable for him, as the boy's family is richer or braver; but, in a way that does not lower the authority of the asker. If the girl's father decides to give his daughter to the asking family, he lets the family know that they must wait until the next day since daughters are only given in the morning. The mediator should have coffee and tobacco on him so during that night they will consume those goods as if sent from the boy. When the girl's hand is given, the mediator takes the "word" to the groom's house. In previous times, the custom was to fire a gun so that the relatives and the village will be notified that the person is locked in marital affairs with a significant other. The mediator also appointed the day of the feast. On that day a party is held for the guests and it lasts from dinner time until the next day's lunch. To the party are invited the man of the girl's house and their close relatives and as soon as they enter the room, the guest is served coffee and tobacco. The first to take the coffee will wait until the others have been given their coffees and then he congratulates them for the girl and friendship between the two parts. Dinner and lunch pass in a joyful mood and depending on the economic position of the groom's house, singers are also invited. From that day, the man of the house has to take care of the bride's dowry because from the time on, she had to be ensured a basis to be able to take care of clothing for her husband, children and husband's parents in the future. Since the man of the groom's house sends the entire dowry to the bride, he goes to the in-laws to set the date for the wedding. The girl's father understands the intention of his guests coming, but the boy's father asks him anyway, as a ritual, "Friend, where is our account?" If the girl's father is prepared then they will set the date of the wedding and in the meantime, the girl's father gives him a thread that is as longs as the girl's height as a symbol of confirmation.

=== Death ===
The death ceremony also had its own traditional features in the area. When someone dies, everyone gathers to the deceased house. First the closest relatives are notified and they decide who should be sent the news and they determine the time of funeral. The corpse is prepared by the closest of kin, and if it is a man that is done by men, and if a woman by the women. If the deceased died late in the day and his burial cannot take place on the same day, then he will be guarded by his relatives and family members of the same genre as he. The corpse is taken among the women and on the burial day the lamenting ladies, and in their absence sister, mother or some female close relative lament the dead by pointing out his virtue, good deeds, and the great pain felt by his loss. It is important to point out that until recently women did not take part on the burial ceremony, but they visited the deceased grave next day. After death in the men's guestroom are received those who came to express condolences and perform the burial. Condolences were accepted by those close to the family of the deceased(son, father, brother), uncle and some of his cousins. After the burial day 'seeing'(the wake) continued for some period, which has lately been reduced, lasting up to three months. Friends and well-wishers that came for condolences left an amount of money on the tray as help for the family. After the wake ceremony has been concluded and after the guests have been served coffee and cigarettes the host give them the word to speak their speeches. Those coming to express condolences usually have good words to say about the deceased, then they praise his family asking it to face up the pain.

== Kuvend ==
The holding of a kuvend, which is an ancient form of regulated parliamentary meetings in Albanian society, within Verrat e Llukës (alder trees of Lluka) near Deçan is an indication of pagan Balkanic beliefs present in Albanian culture. This ties with the development of animistic and pagan beliefs in certain stages of ancient Balkanic culture which resulted in the formation of mountain cults - especially forest cults - that survived in aspects of Albanian society.

== Besa ==
In the beginning Besa had a simple legal character but in time it evolved to a spiritual and moral institution of Albania. Application of besa began surely very early, sometimes at the beginnings of tribal organization of Albanians, and continues to exist even today in the form of a moral institution. Gjeçovi, speaking of besa, says that besa is securing an 'armistice' between two families in blood feud'. Besa is applied in particular in murder cases after which the family of the murderer was compelled to isolation. In order to be able to carry out the works, particularly in the field, the murderer's family asks for besa through a third family intermediator. According to the Code of Lekë Dukagjini the granted besa lasted for 30 days. However, by additional agreement, it could be extended. Besides a legal character among Albanians, besa has also attained a psychological and spiritual character. To Albanians, granting besa means that the aim for which it has been granted has been reached, and if dealing with a secret it means it will never be revealed. It occurred that once granted, besa, should never be violated even in cases when people risked their lives.

== Folk clothes ==
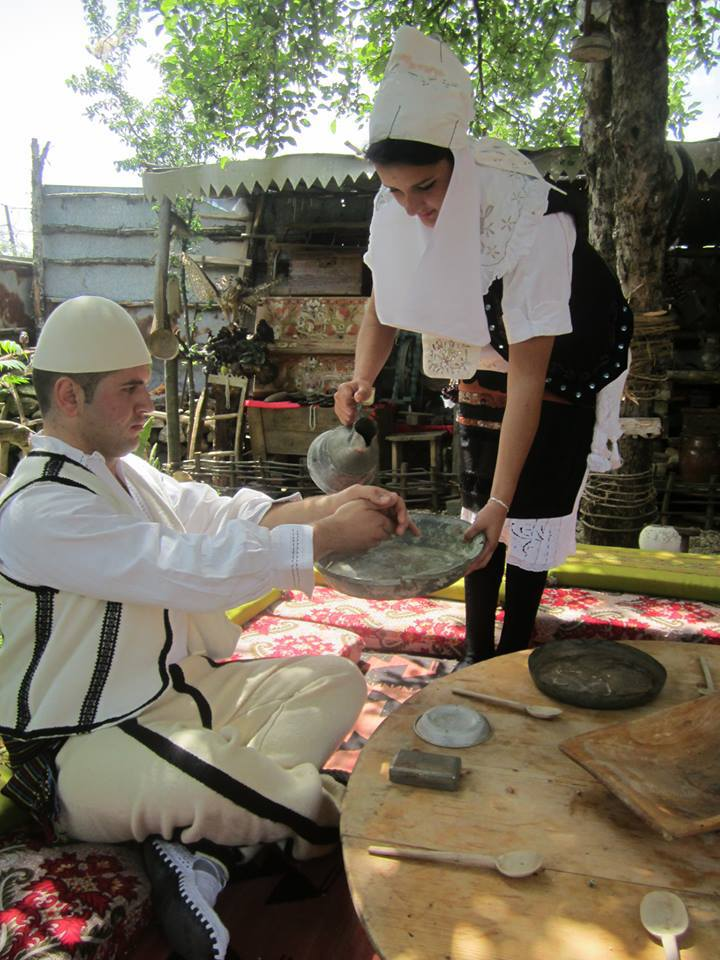
Women and men's traditional Albanian clothes

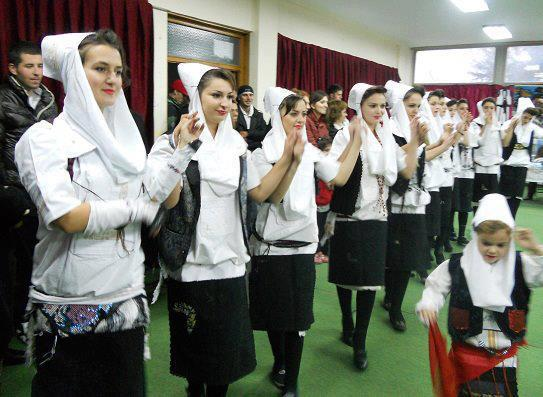
Albanian traditional women's clothes

Folk clothes represent an essential element and ethnic insignia of Albanian people. People of this country appreciate and value this traditional domain. Almost every ethnographic zone has various special characteristics of folk clothes. Folk clothes differ even within a zone' the nuances differ village by village. Folk costumes were worn in the late 1950s. Nowadays only the elders prefer these traditional clothes especially those of men. It is important to mention that in villages young women and older ones still wear these dresses. Young ladies' costumes are not very much different from those of the older women, but they are considerably more modest. The shirt and stockings are made of canvass. The shirt is a bit open and this opening is made by a knitting needle. The stockings reach to the knee and are circled at the end by "beads'. Apart from the shirt, the vest is worn, too, but it was only decorated based on one's economic standing. The young women wore a scarf without fringes on their heads. Earlier the young women wore a round-the waist skirt, but much simpler and smaller than that of older women. Later the apron was worn which was done in a loom and was decorated with broidery made by knitting needle and was usually black. This apron was usually worn above the knee. The lasses wore stockings reaching to the knee and leather shoes. The latter were made of leather and laces, but later they were made of rubber, linen, string, and cotton threads. The young women did not use the same decoration as the older women. Until late the men of the Deçan region wore white or dark (black) leggings (tirq) with braids and vests also we made by braids. The leggings frock was made of wool and knitted by the women in a loom. Later it was pressed on a fuller's mill. Women also made the braids in black threads. Tailors made the sewing of the leggings and vests. The leggings were sown with 2 to 12 stripes of braids and their upper and lower parts were covered in leather. Apart from leggings also a woolen overcoat was sown. The leggings were tied on the belly with a belt and a long and colorful stripe made by women in the loom.

== Food ==
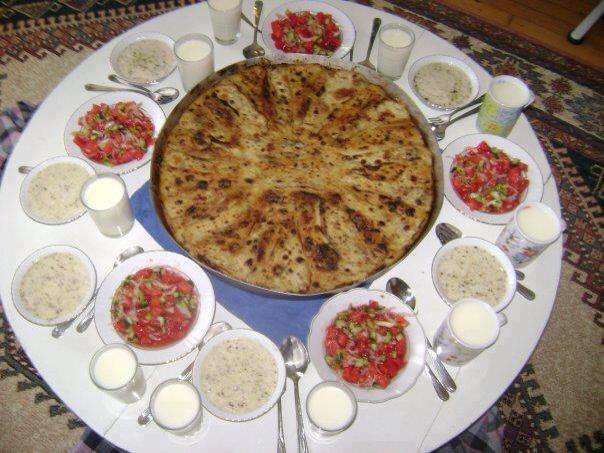
A traditional Albanian dish

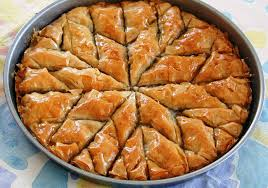
Food which is prepared for feasts

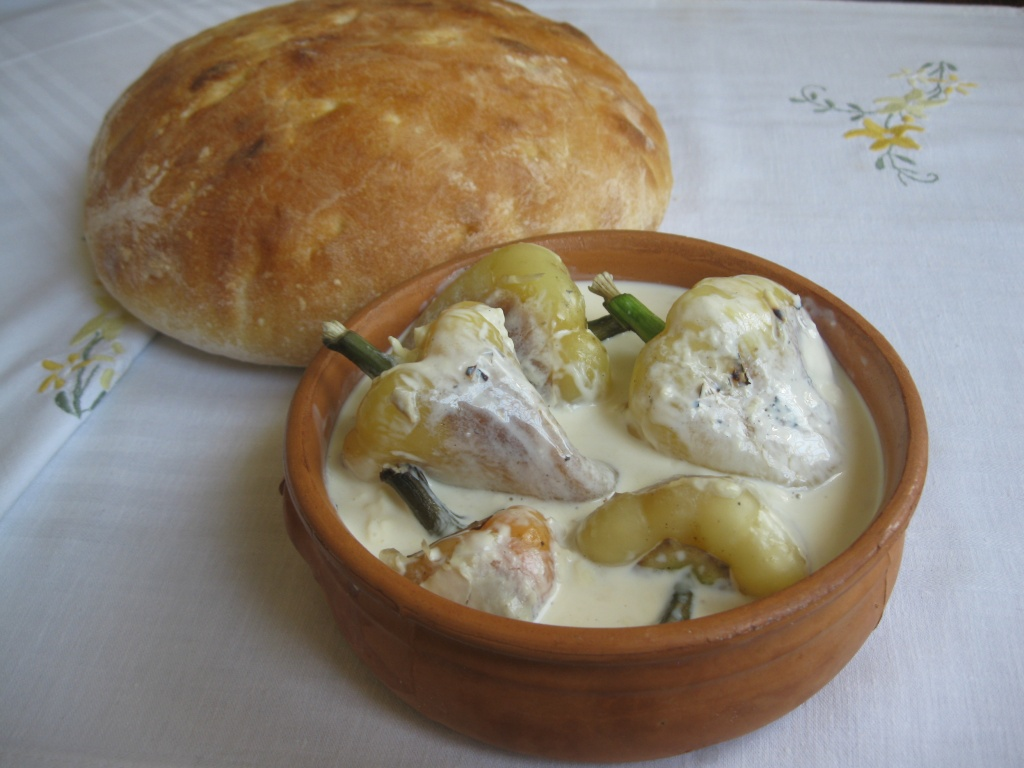
Albanian cuisine

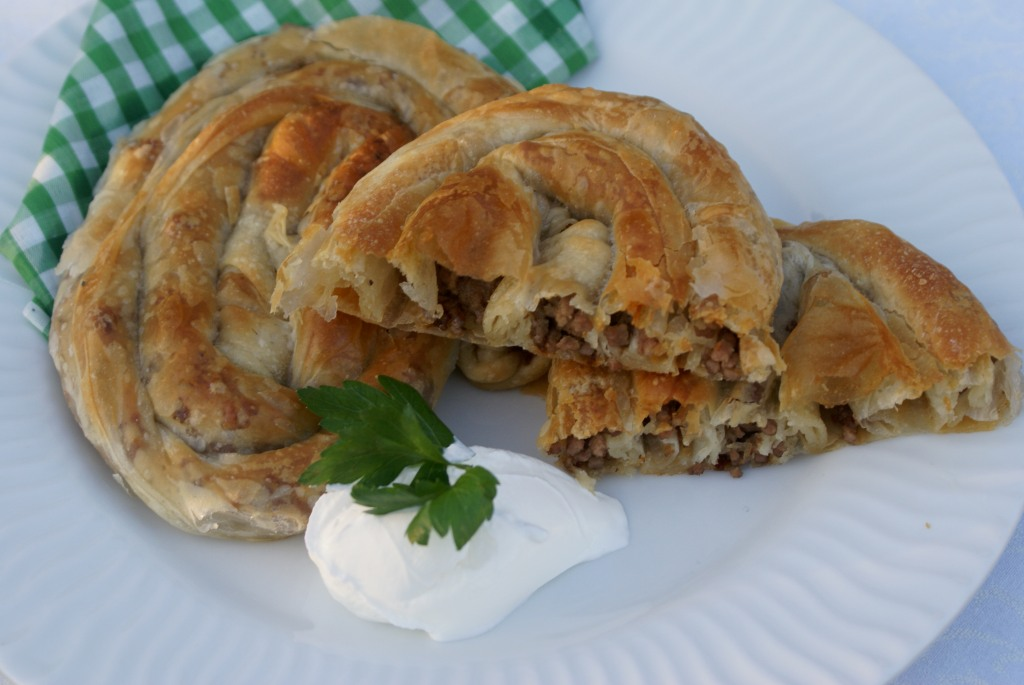
An Albanian recipe

Kosovo Food and Drink Grilled meat dishes are popular and a good bet. Many dishes use freshwater fish. Vegetarian choices are limited. Specialities: • Flija (layered pie with yogurt filling). • Raznjici (skewered meat). • Hajvar (paprika paste). • Qebab (charcoal-grilled minced meat). • Sarma or japrak (vine or cabbage leaves stuffed with meat and rice). • Pliskavica (meat patties of beef and lamb). National drinks: • Albanian wine, especially Velika Hocha. • Kafe Turke (Turkish coffee) • Rakija (spirit usually made from grapes). • Reçel (potent plum brandy).

- Baklava is one of the traditional pastries of the Albanian cuisine. Although of Turkish origin, baklava's preparation and recipe is a small heritage that is passed on generation to generation in Kosovo as well. There are a few different ways of making baklava, (varying from the way it is rolled) or what kind of nuts and fruits it contains.
- A delicious way to spice up your lunch or dinner is to make an appetizer, and this traditional dip might be just the answer. With a very easy to follow recipe, "lëng me speca" (lit. dip with peppers) is a typical Kosovar appetizer. This spicy dip is served with bread (traditionally)
- Byrek (also burekas, börek, burak, boereg, piroq, and other variants on the name). This a type of baked or fried filled pastry, popular in the Arab world, some countries around the Mediterranean Sea, the Slavic cuisines, throughout the Balkans and the former Ottoman Empire. They are made of a thin flaky dough known as phyllo dough (or yufka dough) and are filled with salty cheese (often feta), minced meat, potatoes or other vegetables. Burek may be prepared in a large pan and cut into portions after baking, or as individual pastries. The top of the Burek is often sprinkled with sesame seeds.
- Llokuma are relatively easy to prepare, with ingredients you're likely to have to hand in your kitchen, but served to make a day feel special; for example a perfect Sunday breakfast served with the yoghurt and garlic dip they are also the perfect hangover cure. In traditional Albanian weddings when the bridegroom's party of male friends (minus the groom) has set off to collect the bride from her home, superstition says that they must return a different way from the route they took to her house. On their journey, they stop off at a friend's who will serve them llokuma. Llokuma are also made when a baby is born.

== Games ==
Traditional games are very popular and an important part of our culture heritage maintained from generation to generation. With the intention of filling the leisure time of the age groups, both sexes have their preferred games. These games had no written rules, but still respected rules. We may divide these games now according to the age groups and the time when they were usually played. They may be divided in two children's games of the grown-ups. Children's games include games with lasse and lads.

=== Stick game ===
Shepherds in the mountains usually play this game. In the game, the participants are an undetermined number of players. They all sit at a straight line and throw at a cane by beating against the ground a thin bending branch. The one who throws closer to the cane follows the service. The player making the service extends his branch and player's line. The players will throw in the same way as when measuring where the branch touches the ground and the one that flies the furthest the server puts his branch. The game continues in this way until the branch of the server has been touched. The person serving is the one to bring back all the branches for a new throw. When the player cannot touch his branch, he gathers then and sits among the players. He puts all the branches over his head and by that he will choose the branch, which he aims to throw. If he touches one with any of the branches, its owner then will serve. But if he does not, he continues to serve as loser.

=== Touch and run game ===
It is a game usually played by girls but often boys were also involved. By counting the one that will pursue the game was appointed. Then he runs to touch someone else and leave him "ngile" (the touch). Players run away to avoid the touch.

=== Hat game ===
While the young and children played the above-mentioned games in both open nature and indoors, all age groups particularly by the elderly in men's room played the hat game. In the men's room a number of men gathered from the village or neighboring villages. First a team of three players each were formed and the host would bring in five pairs of socks and small metallic sphere. The teams were seated facing each other and lined up the sticks two rows with five each. Then one of the teams' leaders hides his hands behind and then stretches them forward offering the rival to select. If they find the sphere they will start the game first if not then the one who threw the bet will hide the sphere first. He holds the sphere into his fist and quickly puts his hand under each sock, leaving it unheeded less than one of them. If the opposition team notices it, they will catch it on its way and they will win ten points. But if the sphere is hidden without being noticed on its way, the rival has to search for it. The leader consults with his team members if they have a target or if they suspect any of the targets. Then he begins unraveling the socks. When he unravels the first, he says: "For you", meaning for his rival. If the sphere is under the particular sock, the rival will hide it again.

=== Blind-eyed game ===
It was the most widespread game among children regardless of sex. The one who would start the game was appointed by counting or by singing as follow:

Elem, belem| Belbasiqi Sara, piq, gramatiqi Hiq, piq, krasniq Qeto mere, qeta hiq (a game of words without a particular meaning).

The one that was the last to be counted began the game by closing his/her eyes. Once his/her eyes were closed he/she counts to twenty. During that time everyone hides. Finally, the one that closed his/her eyes calls: "Ready or not, I open my eyes!" Then he/she begins searching for the hidden ones. The one found first, as agreed, will be the next to have his/her eyes closed. If all of them succeed in "spiting" him out, he/she will continue to close his/her eyes.

== Anniversary rites ==
Anniversary rites have a continuation in this region, since the ancient times. Within these rites, fall the summer days rites, Saint George rites, those of climbing Mountains, shearing, chumming, descends, harvest dinner, pastrami dinner, etc.

=== Summer days ===
Summer days are on 11th, 12th and 13 March and are featured by juniper burning. The children, several days before the spring day, bring juniper trees from Mountains, they gather them in the courtyard and on the night of 11th members gather around the fire and jump over the fire wishing that all the evil, bad things and summer fever get burned. Each family burns their junipers on their own courtyard. All family women and girls on this day do not do any work after dinner and for dinner smoked pastrami legs are prepared.

=== Saint George ===
Saint George's Day is celebrated on 6 May, but the celebration begins much earlier by cleaning and whitewashing the house. On Saint George's night children gather flowers and willow tree branches with leaves decorating the house and the courtyard. On that night flowers, leaves and nettles are laid on beds. On the Saint George day all wakes up early in the morning and women wash their children with water in which nettles, flowers, and grasses have been poured. Earlier also grass of furuncle was mixed to be given to cattle in order to not get sick on summer. On the Saint George day women do not work either. Shepherds separate the lambs from the sheep on Saint George's day and the entire family eats milk pap.

=== Climbing the mountains ===
The Dukagjini region, including Deçan, are good cattle-raisers and pass their summer time in mountains with cattle. Climbing on the mountains is prepared weeks earlier in advance by purchasing necessary things. The transport is done on horse-back and donkeys. After preparation, two or three shepherds come together and with their loads take up road to the mountain. Days before, cattle are colored in red and bells are put on their necks. When the flock gets going, the courtyard gates open wide and axes are thrown. Loom items, a hand of nettles, a big needle, are among the items which are loaded along. In order to have a journey without a spell of an evil eye, the woman of the house sends the flock off by looking at it from a bread soave so that damage would not befall on the livestock and they can be kept safe.

=== Shearing ===
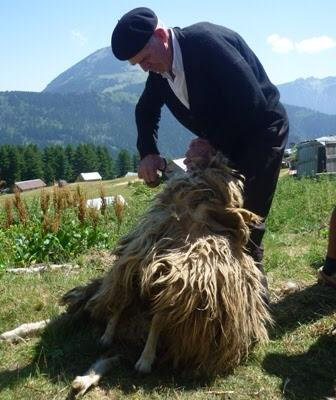
This is a tradition of the people who live in Deçan.

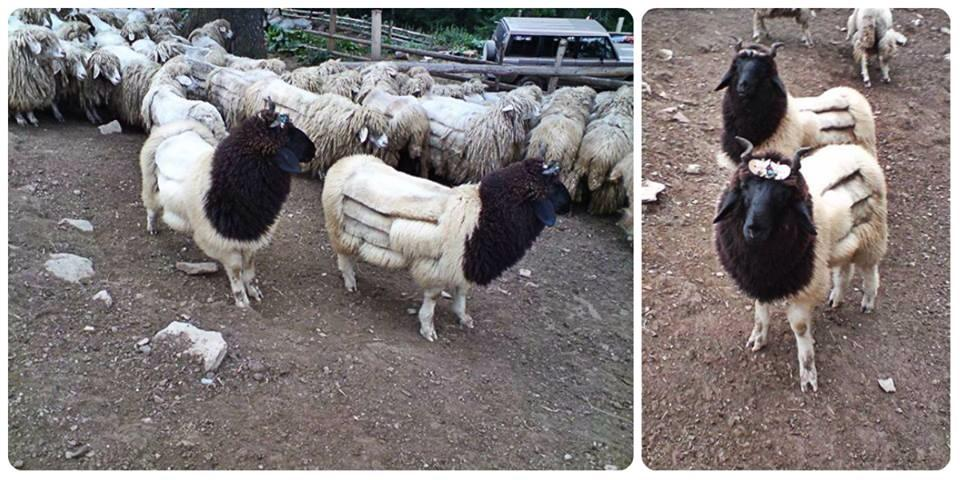
The kind of shearing which Albanians of the area apply to their sheep

Traditional rite of shearings so far was held in the mountains of Roshkodol, in Zllonopoje in the mountains of Prilep, In the mountains of Lumbardh etc. Shear tradition was maintained with major challenges. Some shearer that have started from childhood to know the shorn 12 types ranging from the round shape, with the sequence, the moon, the star, in the form of a serpent, with a trap ....and many other forms. Sheep which holds terrkaqen - or knell sheep to be shorn in order to be of particular because the herds of sheep must be distinguished. But note that this is related to the particular arrangement of shearers, shearer ranging from the oldest, the best shearer, the shearer who shears the rams and the shearer that shear the sheep The - bell. "Ogiqet" aren't sheared, because not counted by years or fawn, but counted with years it has not been shaved. This ritual is among the oldest rites. Even this is a job of art. For a long time, wool was the raw material used by the family to ensure clothing for the entire year. Shearing of sheep was done in a ritual way. The period of shearing began in the middle of summer, when they had nearly finished all the house duties of the summer. The shepherd would invite shearers and other people to honor them. For this day, besides a sheep being slain for the meat for the guests, other traditional dishes were also prepared. Breakfast was served usually with corn bread and thickened milk, and for lunch, apart from other foods, boiled cream was served; a special mountaineers food. In Deçans mountains the sheep are usually sheared in rows, randomly in four or five rows. The best shearer shared the dark sheep. There is also a traditional element that should not be omitted: the one who sheared the rams at dinner is served the sheep backbone and the dearest guest is served its head.

=== Descends ===
At the Cursed Mountains the "descends" are of the most characteristic rites. Speaking of Deçan the time of descending from mountains was set by the village council dealing with mountains and forests. The descends consist of two stages. Two weeks before the "Karvaj" (that is how the caravan of people descending the mountains were called) began the churning. The dairy gathered during summer was prepared to be descended before children. The cream was churned (a process through with butter was separated from the brim) and in the brim cottage cheese remained. Children and adults too await for this moment with joy, as delicious mash was prepared by it. A day before they go and fetch snow so on that night they add to the cream in order to make it cooler. The women of the cottage(baqica)is very busy at that time. Children, on those days, upon their return from blueberries gathering, sang in joy:

Tuna, Tuna, vaja-vaja Sot dy javë vinë karvaja vinë karvajat varg e vi na vinë teshat me shami...

(Tuna, tuna, vaja-vaja In two weeks will come "karvaja" Caravans come one by one Our clothes come in a bundle...)

This song is sung joyfully by children because the descend meant as a custom they would be given new clothing, e.g. leather shoes, shirts, wool pants, vests, scarves, beads, etc. Later on, when trade developed, these things could be bought at market. The descending took place on the same day for all the cottage owners. The one that had the best horses lead the caravan. At a set place the caravan stopped for lunch. Because of this at the Deçan Gorge there exists a micro-toponym Pie's Spring. In the evening, after they all reached home, guests were invited for the "descend dinner". Guests said their welcome and expressed their happiness for their safe coming from the mountains. Dinner was served with traditional foods, boiled cream amongst others.

=== Harvest and Pastrami dinners ===
These are two dinners that enrich the anniversary rites. The first is served when family has completed all field works and is called the threshing dinner. In it are invited all the close relatives of the man of the house who wish him a healthy harvest yield. The pastrami dinner is at the beginning of winter when a cattle \has been slain and on the occasion the men of the house invites guest to dinner. Albanians have inherited habits and traditions of sacrifice, remembrance, joy and peace . One of them is the tradition of "Supper Lama" and its linguistic variations known as "Night of the field", "Night of the crops", etc. "Harvest Supper" is a traditional Albanian party which is usually held in late October reap the benefits when the summer job. Lama called for "llama" has been flat land in villages Highlands, where are threshed crops, mainly maize. While the field is named "dinner of the field" after being harvested its benefits, mainly wheat. Lama was also gravitating instead of solidarity and reciprocity among Albanian villagers, helping each other with manpower. Given that the Albanians area was part bukësore significant dilution of ethics, "giving bread" has been an essential aspect of traditional social relations. Ethnographic evidence shows that the collection of products and completion of works in various areas Kosovo, is always organized a big dinner joint to thank people who have helped the conclusion of livestock and agricultural affairs. This is evidenced in the recent years in different villages.
