= Vranj =

Vranj: Врањ; Vranë
- Village
- Location within Montenegro
- Coordinates: 42.326037°N 19.297391°E
- Country: Montenegro
- Municipality: Tuzi

Population (2011)
  - Total: 1,012
- Time zone: UTC+1 (CET)
  - Summer (DST): UTC+2 (CEST)

Vranj (Serbian Cyrillic: Врањ; Albanian: Vranë) is a village in the municipality of Tuzi, Montenegro. It is located south of Tuzi town.

== Demographics ==
According to the 2011 census, its population was 1,012.

Ethnicity in 2011
| Ethnicity | Number | Percentage |
|---|---|---|
| Albanians | 375 | 37.1% |
| Montenegrins | 331 | 32.7% |
| Serbs | 169 | 16.7% |
| Bosniaks | 25 | 2.5% |
| other/undeclared | 112 | 11.1% |
| Total | 1,012 | 100% |
