= Vladni =

Vladni Владни Vllanë
- Village
- Location within Montenegro
- Coordinates: 42.341718°N 19.286488°E
- Country: Montenegro
- Municipality: Tuzi

Population (2011)
  - Total: 474
- Time zone: UTC+1 (CET)
  - Summer (DST): UTC+2 (CEST)

Vladni (Serbian Cyrillic: Владни; Albanian: Vllanë) is a village in the municipality of Tuzi, Montenegro. It is located southwest of Tuzi town.

== Demographics ==
According to the 2011 census, its population was 474.

Ethnicity in 2011
Ethnicity	Number	Percentage
Albanians	301	63.5%
Montenegrins	144	30.4%
Bosniaks	8	1.7%
other/undeclared	21	4.4%
Total	474	100%
