= Podhum =

Podhum may refer to:

- Podhum, Konjic, a village in the Konjic municipality, Bosnia and Herzegovina
- Podhum, Livno, a village in the Livno municipality, Bosnia and Herzegovina
- Podhum, Croatia, a village in the Jelenje municipality
  - Podhum massacre, of Croat civilians by Italian occupation forces in 1942
- Podhum, Tuzi, a village in the Tuzi Municipality
