= Tuzi Municipality =

Tuzi Municipality Opština Tuzi Општина Тузи Komuna e Tuzit
- Municipality
- Flag Coat of arms

- Tuzi Municipality in Montenegro
- Country: Montenegro
- Seat: Tuzi

Population (2011)
  - Total: 11,422 (4,748 Tuzi town)
- Time zone: UTC+1 (CET)
  - Summer (DST): UTC+2 (CEST)
- Postal code: 81206
- Area code: +382
- ISO 3166 code: ME-24
- Website: www.tuzi.org.me

Tuzi Municipality (Montenegrin: Opština Tuzi / Општина Тузи, Albanian: Komuna e Tuzit) is one of the 25 Municipalities of Montenegro. The municipal seat is the town of Tuzi. The municipality is located about 10 km south of the capital Podgorica and consists of more than 40 distinct settlements. The municipality roughly encompasses the Montenegrin part of the Malesija (Albanian: Malësia) region.

== Geography and location ==
Tuzi is situated to the northwest of Lake Shkodra, 10 km from Podgorica and 130 km from Tirana (Albania). It is located in an environment of forests and mountains that are further connected to the Accursed Mountains. Later developments also include a football stadium, Korita, Lake of Rikavac, Vitoja, wellspring in Traboin, Cem, etc. It is located along the main road between the City of Podgorica and the Albanian border crossing, just a few kilometers north of Lake Shkodra. The Church of St. Anthony and Qazimbeg's Mosque are located in the centre of the town. Tuzi has been an independent municipality since 1 September 2018.

== Local parliament ==
Party	Seats	Gov't.
Albanian Forum (ASh–LDMZ–UDSh)	16	Yes
Democratic Party of Socialists (DPS)	10	No
Bosniak Party of Montenegro (BS)	4	Yes
Democratic Montenegro (Democrats)	1	Yes
Social Democrats of Montenegro (SD)	1	No

== Settlements ==
The Municipality of Tuzi consists of the following towns and villages (2011 census):

Name		Population (2011)	Predominant ethnic group	Predominant religion
Montenegrin Name	Albanian Name	Population (2011)	Predominant ethnic group	Predominant religion
Tuzi	Tuz	4748	Albanians 50.18 / 100	Islam 61.98 / 100
Arza	Arrëzë	29	Albanians 93.10 / 100	Catholicism 96.55 / 100
Barlaj	Bardhaj	57	Albanians 100 / 100	Catholicism 100 / 100
Benkaj	Bëkaj	2	Albanians 100 / 100	Catholicism 100 / 100
Budza	Buxë	25	Albanians 100 / 100	Catholicism 100 / 100
Cijevna	Cem	63	Albanians 98.41 / 100	Catholicism 98.41 / 100
Delaj	Delaj	23	Albanians 100 / 100	Catholicism 100 / 100
Dinoša	Dinoshë	500	Albanians 95 / 100	Islam 82.19 / 100
Donji Milješ	Milesh i Poshtëm	512	Albanians 80.27 / 100	Islam 99.41 / 100
Drešaj	Dreshaj	176	Albanians 98.29 / 100	Catholicism 98.29 / 100
Drume	Drume	164	Albanians 99.39 / 100	Catholicism 99.39 / 100
Dušići	Dushiq	188	Albanians 93.08 / 100	Catholicism 96.27 / 100
Gornji Milješ	Milesh i Sipërm	742	Albanians 96.22 / 100	Islam 87.73 / 100
Gurec	Gurrec	46	Albanians 100 / 100	Catholicism 100 / 100
Helmica	Helmicë	51	Albanians 100 / 100	Catholicism 80.39 / 100
Koći	Kojë	54	Albanians 88.88 / 100	Catholicism 88.88 / 100
Kotrabudan	Kodërbudan	233	Albanians 97.85 / 100	Islam 60.94 / 100
Krševo	Këshevë	168	Albanians 94.64 / 100	Islam 50.60 / 100
Lovka	Llofkë	43	Albanians 100 / 100	Catholicism 100 / 100
Mužečka	Muzheçk	15	Albanians 100 / 100	Catholicism 100 / 100
Nabojin	Nabom	46	Albanians 100 / 100	Catholicism 100 / 100
Nik Maraš	Nikmarash	10	Albanians 100 / 100	Catholicism 100 / 100
Omerbožovići	Omerbozhaj	193	Albanians 90.15 / 100	Catholicism 90.67 / 100
Pikalja	Pikalë	54	Albanians 90.74 / 100	Catholicism 98.14 / 100
Poprat	Poprat	33	Albanians 100 / 100	Catholicism 100 / 100
Pothum	Nënhelm	253	Albanians 87.35 / 100	Catholicism 71.93 / 100
Rakića Kuće	Rakiq	279	Albanians 51.25 / 100	Catholicism 51.61 / 100
Rudine	Rudinë	10	Albanians 100 / 100	Catholicism 100 / 100
Selište	Selisht	47	Albanians 95.74 / 100	Catholicism 95.74 / 100
Skorać	Skorraq	137	Albanians 100 / 100	Catholicism 100 / 100
Spinja	Spi	39	Albanians 100 / 100	Catholicism 100 / 100
Stjepovo	Stjepoh	24	Albanians 95.83 / 100	Catholicism 91.66 / 100
Sukuruć	Sukruq	661	Albanians 96.06 / 100	Catholicism 94.09 / 100
Traboin	Traboin	48	Albanians 100 / 100	Catholicism 100 / 100
Vladna	Vllanë	474	Albanians 63.50 / 100	Islam 90.71 / 100
Vranj	Vranë	1012	Albanians 37.05 / 100	Islam 43.08 / 100
Vuksanlekići	Vuksanlekaj	267	Albanians 98.12 / 100	Catholicism 99.25 / 100

z - no data or data protected

== Demographics ==
According to 2011 census, the town of Tuzi has a population of 4,748, while the Tuzi Municipality has 11,422 residents. Of them, over half are Albanians, 1/3 define themselves as ethnic Muslims, 1/4 as Bosniaks and the rest as Montenegrins. There is also a small community of Romani.

According to the last national census of 2023 the newly formed municipality is made up of the following ethnic groups:

Year	2023	2023
Ethnic group	Population	Percentage
Albanians	8,119	61.77%
Bosniaks	1,772	13.48%
Ethnic Muslims	702	5.34%
Montenegrins	1,964	14.94%
Serbs	258	1.96%
Romani people	247	1.87%
Total	13,142	100%

According to the 2023 census, the Municipality of Tuzi has a population of 13,142 residents.

== Gallery ==
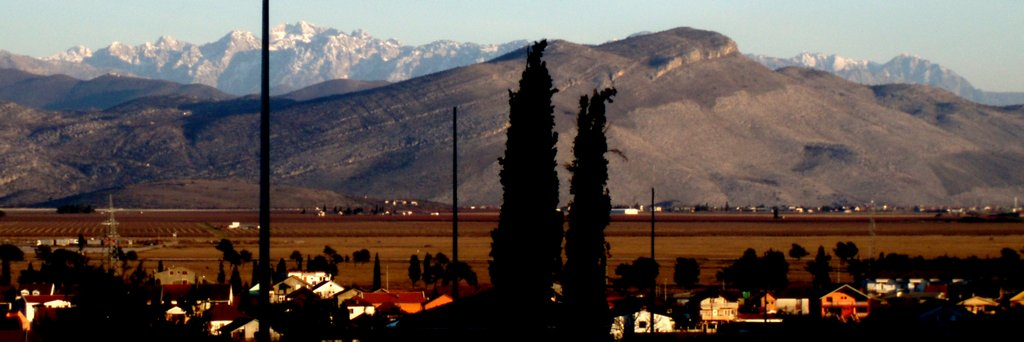
Town of Tuzi and the Dečić Hill

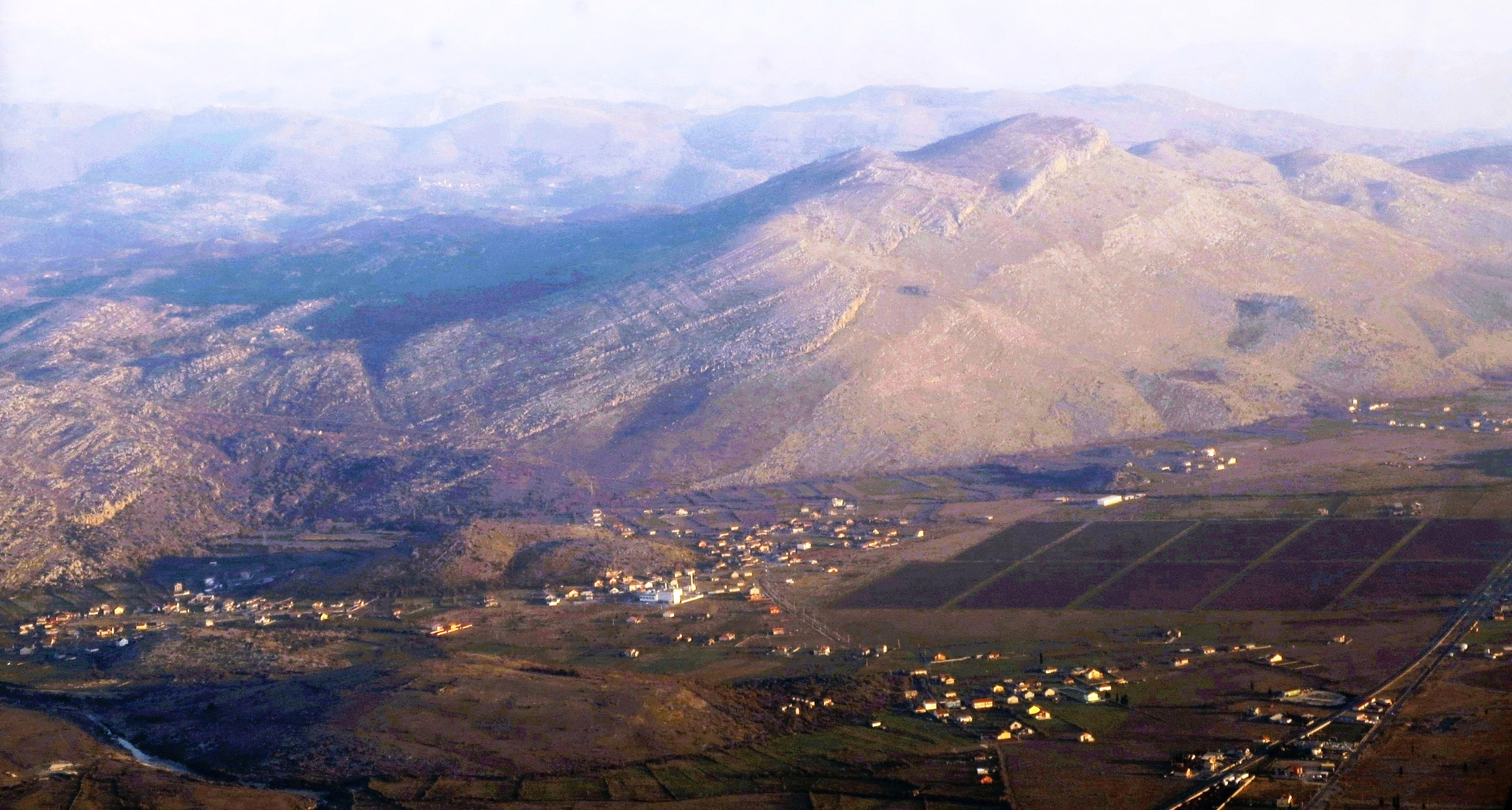
Dečić Hill and the Prokletije Massif

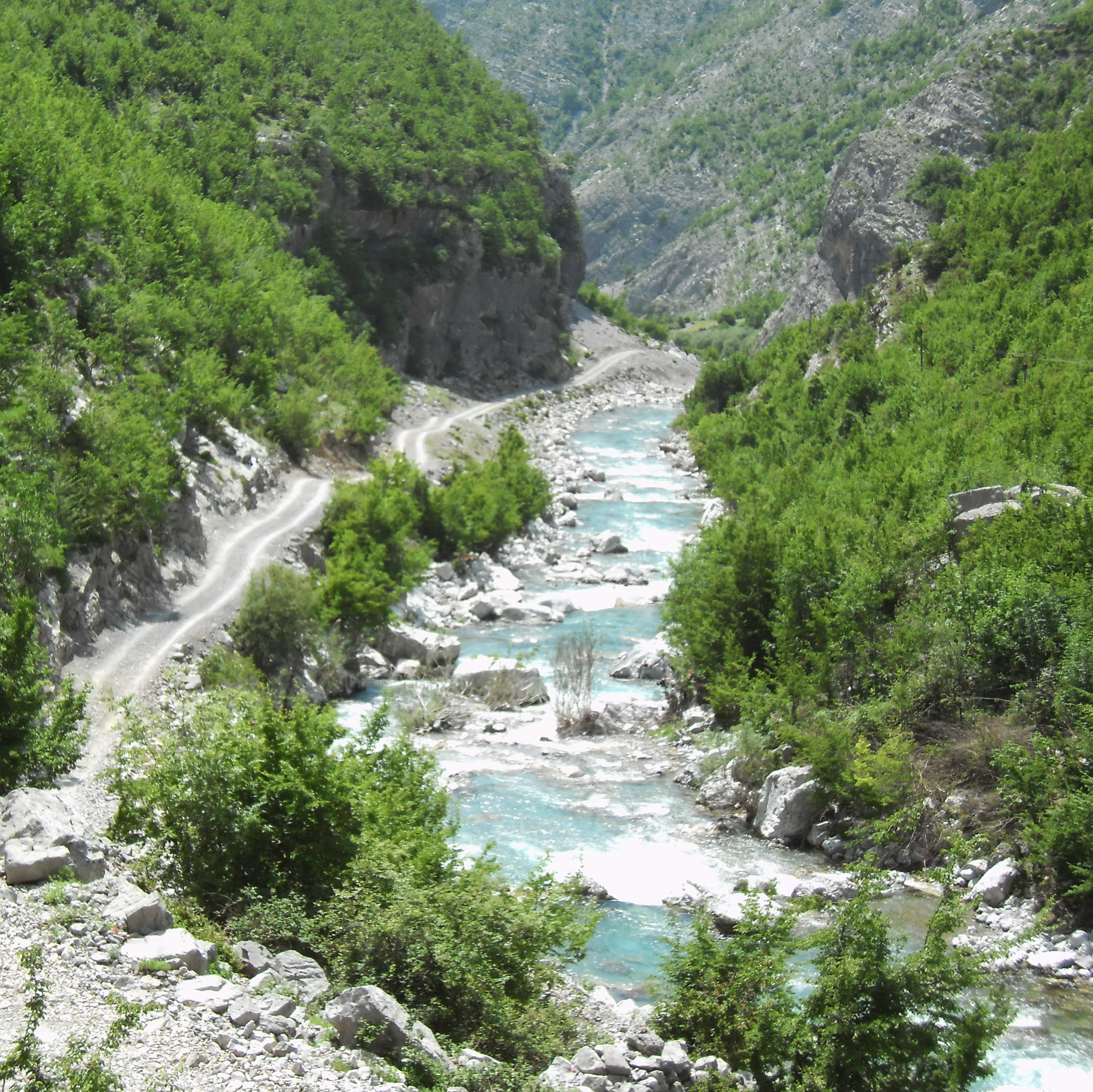
Cem river (Cijevna), Tuzi municipality

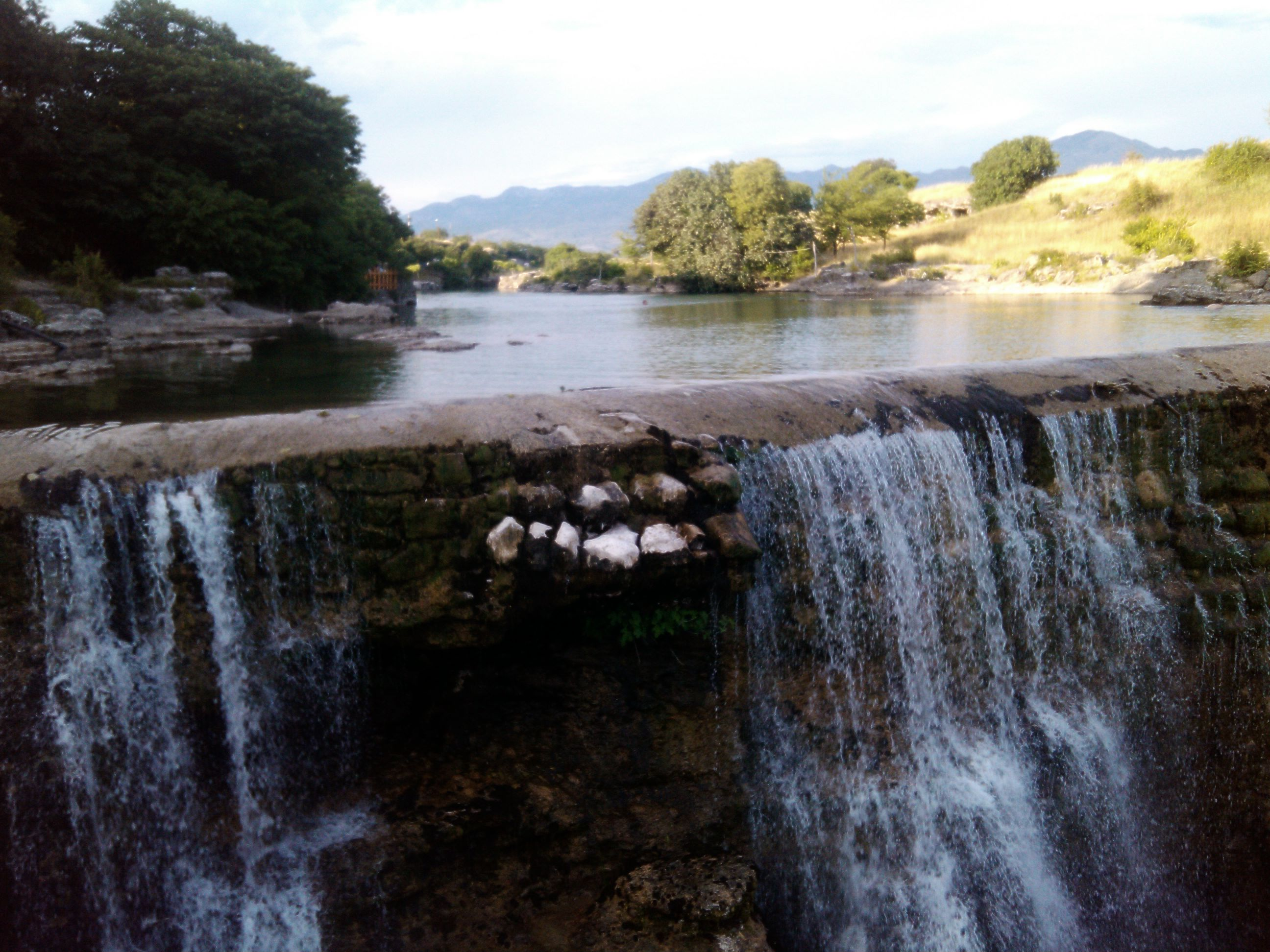
Cijevna (Cem) river waterfalls
