= Dukljan =

Serbian mythological figure

Dukljan or Dukljanin (Serbian Cyrillic: Дукљан or Дукљанин) is a figure in Serbian mythology that is a reflection of the Roman emperor Diocletian. He is presented as the adversary of God, possibly because of the real Diocletian's persecution of Christians.

Legends attribute to him the building of the town of Duklja, Dukljan's border, and the Roman milestones near Tuzi (according to a folktale, he was throwing them at his brother and sister as they were fleeing to Hum).

A Serbian folk song about Dukljan says that he once removed the Sun from the sky and brought it to the Earth. Saint John managed to trick him and restore the Sun, but afterwards, while chasing him, Dukljan grabbed at him and tore a piece of flesh from John's foot, which explains why humans have arches of the foot.

Several variants of a story that he is still alive exist; according to them he is chained in the Morača river near Duklja (the Vizier's bridge). In some of them, he constantly gnaws at his chains, and each year around Christmas (or around Đurđevdan) nearly manages to break free and destroy the world, when four Gypsy blacksmiths reforge the chains.

== See also ==
- Kjárr
