= Malësor Prenkoçaj =

Malësori
- Born: Malësor Prenkoçaj; 17 July 1977 (age 48); Titograd, SR Montenegro, SFR Yugoslavia
- Genres: folk music
- Occupation: Singer
- Years active: 1997–present
- Website: malesori.eu/Malesori.htm

Malësor Prenkoçaj (born 17 July 1977), known professionally as Malësori, is a famous Albanian folk singer.

== Career ==
Malesori was born and raised in Podgorica, Montenegro to Albanian parents from Trieshi Malesia e Madhe.Mother Mria Gjonaj and father Gjergj Prenkocaj.

Malësori's passion for Albanian music began as a child. At a young age he became a member of the prestigious folk group Besa (a rehash of the traditional Albanian Besa, where he blossomed into both a singer as well as an established instrumentalist of traditional instruments such as çiftelia and sharkia. Besa was one of the best folk groups in the region of Malesia e Madhe, and was led by his uncle Dodë Gjonaj, who was known as one of the best instrumentalists of the çiftelia in Malesia.

Malësori rose to fame in 2002/2003 after he performed the song "Kthehuni"(his masterpiece), which became a great hit among Albanian circles. The song broke away from the traditional folk songs which were popular at the time. The song is about how the Albanians were pushed to leave their homes and lands and how they immigrated in foreign countries, especially Albanians in Montenegro (Malesia, Uqin, Plava and Gucia, Tivari).

His popularity expanded to other Albanian-speaking areas in the region after contributing a great deal of time and money to newly independent Kosovo immediately after the war. Malësori sang in many humanitarian concerts to support freedom fighters of Kosovo Liberation Army and he sang many songs about Albanian figures, such as Gjergj Kastrioti Skenderbeu, Dede Gjon Luli, Adem Jashari, Zahir Pajaziti etc. He has also performed at benefits that raised money to feed poor Albanian families in the region.

Today, Malësori is widely known among Albanians across the globe, and has performed in Montenegro, Kosovo, Albania, North Macedonia, the US, UK and all around the EU where Albanians live. He studied The English Language and Literature at the University of Pristina. He is married and now he resides in Pristina, Republic of Kosovo

== Discography ==
- "Veç për ty" (1998)
- "M'ke lënë kot" (2000)
- "Kthehuni" (2003)
- "Fjalë e vetëm fjalë" (2005)
- "kollazhi"Qaj për ditën" (2006)
- "The best of Malësori" (2007)
- "The best of Malesori ll" (2009)
- "Atmosfere pa kufi"(2010)
- "Live 2012" (2012)
