= Kotrabudan =

Kotrabudan Котрабудан Kodërbudan
- Village
- Location within Montenegro
- Coordinates: 42.317978°N 19.327097495°E
- Country: Montenegro
- Municipality: Tuzi

Population (2011)
  - Total: 233
- Time zone: UTC+1 (CET)
  - Summer (DST): UTC+2 (CEST)

Kotrabudan (Cyrillic: Котрабудан; Albanian: Kodërbudan) is a village in the municipality of Tuzi, Montenegro.

== Demographics ==
According to the 2011 census, its population was 233, all but 5 of them are Albanians.
