= Dinoša =

Dinoša Dinosha
- Village
- Dinoša; Диноша
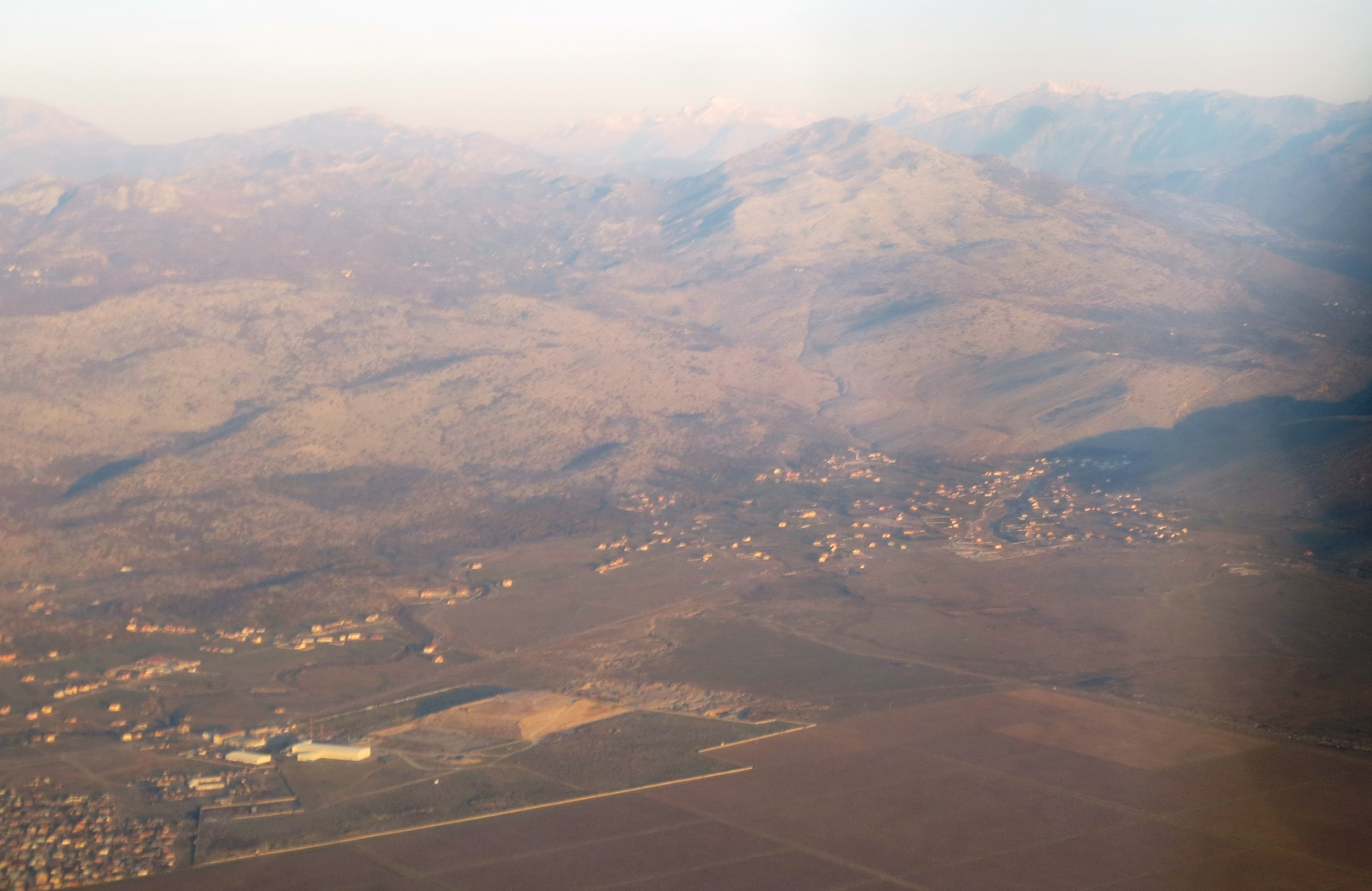
- Aerial view of Dinoša village

- Location within Montenegro
- Country: Montenegro
- Municipality: Tuzi

Population (2011)
  - Total: 500
- Time zone: UTC+1 (CET)
  - Summer (DST): UTC+2 (CEST)

Dinoša (Cyrillic: Диноша; Albanian: Dinosha) is a village in the municipality of Tuzi, Montenegro. It is one of several settlements part of the historical tribal region known as Gruda, inhabited by a majority of ethnic Albanians. Baca Kurti (c. 1807–1881) was an Albanian leader who participated in the Battle of Novšiće against the Principality of Montenegro. He is buried in Dinosha, Saint Michel's graveyard. Above the village are the remains of a fortress, locally known as Qyteza/Đuteza.

== Demographics ==
According to the 2011 census, its population was 500. The Albanians of this village speak in the Gheg dialect of the Albanian language. The majority of the village are Muslims, with a small Catholic minority.

Ethnicity in 2011
| Ethnicity | Number | Percentage |
|---|---|---|
| Albanians | 475 | 95.0% |
| Montenegrins | 11 | 2.2% |
| Bosniaks | 9 | 1.8% |
| other/undeclared | 5 | 1.0% |
| Total | 500 | 100% |

=== Demographic history ===
Historical population

| Year | Pop. | ±% |
|---|---|---|
| 1948 | 272 | — |
| 1953 | 377 | +38.6% |
| 1961 | 457 | +21.2% |
| 1971 | 575 | +25.8% |

| Year | Pop. | ±% |
|---|---|---|
| 1981 | 669 | +16.3% |
| 1991 | 570 | −14.8% |
| 2003 | 520 | −8.8% |
| 2011 | 500 | −3.8% |

In 1941, there were 308 Muslims and 69 Roman Catholics in the village.

== See also ==
- Dinoša mulberry tree
