= Omerbožovići =

Omerbožovići Омербожовићи Omerbozhaj
- Village
- Location within Montenegro
- Coordinates: 42.422752°N 19.311951°E
- Country: Montenegro
- Municipality: Tuzi

Population (2011)
  - Total: 193
- Time zone: UTC+1 (CET)
  - Summer (DST): UTC+2 (CEST)

Omerbožovići (Cyrillic: Омербожовићи; Albanian: Omerbozhaj) is a village in the municipality of Tuzi, Montenegro. It is located just east of Podgorica.

== Demographics ==
According to the 2011 census, its population was 193.

Ethnicity in 2011
Ethnicity	Number	Percentage
Albanians	174	90.2%
Montenegrins	11	5.7%
other/undeclared	8	4.1%
Total	193	100%
