= Sukuruć =

Sukuruć Сукурућ Sukruq
- Village
- Location within Montenegro
- Coordinates: 42.326255°N 19.321118°E
- Country: Montenegro
- Municipality: Tuzi

Population (2011)
  - Total: 661
- Time zone: UTC+1 (CET)
  - Summer (DST): UTC+2 (CEST)

Sukuruć (Cyrillic: Сукурућ; Albanian: Sukruq) is a village in the municipality of Tuzi, Montenegro.

It was the birthplace of Roko Camaj, a Janitor who died in 9/11

== Demographics ==
According to the 2011 census, its population was 661.

Ethnicity in 2011
Ethnicity	Number	Percentage
Albanians	635	96.1%
Montenegrins	7	1.1%
other/undeclared	19	2.9%
Total	661	100%
