= Donji Milješ =

Donji Milješ Доњи Миљеш Milesh i Poshtëm
- Village
- Location within Montenegro
- Coordinates: 42°23′21″N 19°19′35″E
- Country: Montenegro
- Municipality: Tuzi

Population (2011)
  - Total: 512
- Time zone: UTC+1 (CET)
  - Summer (DST): UTC+2 (CEST)

Donji Milješ (Cyrillic: Доњи Миљеш; Albanian: Milesh i Poshtëm) is a village in the municipality of Tuzi, Montenegro. It is located northeast of Tuzi town and used to be part of Podgorica Municipality.

== Demographics ==
According to the 2003 census, it had a population of 391.

According to the 2011 census, its population was 512.

Ethnicity in 2011
Ethnicity	Number	Percentage
Albanians	411	80.3%
Bosniaks	46	9.0%
Montenegrins	21	4.1%
other/undeclared	34	6.6%
Total	512	100%
