= Drešaj =

Drešaj Дрешај Dreshaj
- Village
- Location within Montenegro
- Country: Montenegro
- Municipality: Tuzi

Population (2011)
  - Total: 176
- Time zone: UTC+1 (CET)
  - Summer (DST): UTC+2 (CEST)

Drešaj (Cyrillic: Дрешај; Albanian: Dreshaj) is a village in the municipality of Tuzi, Montenegro.

== Demographics ==
According to the 2011 census, its population was 176, all but three of them Albanians.
