= Crazy Vuk's border =

Crazy Vuk's border (Serbian: Међа Вука манитога, Međa Vuka manitoga), sometimes also called Dukljan's border (Дукљанова међа, Dukljanova međa), is remains of a border wall in Montenegro.

== History ==
The source for the name Crazy Vuk's border is uncertain. In the area of a section of the wall in Vuksanlekići, a metal medallion dating to ancient Macedonia was found.

== Description ==
It follows the line Dubrovnik-Bijela gora (above Grahovo)-Cuce-Čevska planina-Ostrog-Razbijeni vrh (Bjelopavlići)-Donja Morača-Kom.

The wall is roughly 3 metres (9.8 ft) tall and can be as much as 2 metres (6.6 ft) thick. Every 2 kilometres (1.2 mi) to 3 kilometres (1.9 mi), there is drinking water in the form of wells, springs, of cisterns. The wall also includes roads which were used by the Greeks and Romans.

== In popular culture ==
Serbian poet Matija Bećković wrote a book of poems of the same name. However, the book does not directly reference the wall.
