= Roko Camaj =

Albanian-American who died in the World Trade Center attack

- Born: August 17, 1941; Sukuruć, Zeta Banovina, Yugoslavia
- Died: September 11, 2001 (aged 60); South Tower of the World Trade Center, New York City, United States
- Cause of death: Collapse of 2 World Trade Center during the September 11 attacks
- Occupation: Window washer
- Known for: Cleaning windows of the World Trade Center

Roko Camaj (August 17, 1941 – September 11, 2001) was an Albanian–American window washer who was born in Montenegro and known for his work on the original World Trade Center in New York City. He was killed in the September 11 attacks when the South Tower collapsed.

== Life ==
Roko Camaj was born in Montenegro and immigrated to the United States in 1969. He began his career at the World Trade Center in 1973, working for ABM Industries. Camaj was particularly recognized for cleaning the upper floors of the South Tower, which required manual washing due to the large panes of glass.

Camaj and his partner, James Meehan, hand-washed the highest windows of the World Trade Center, a task that took about two weeks to complete and was done three times a year. The resident window-washing machines, nicknamed "King Kongs," could not handle these wider windows, making Camaj's work essential. According to Salon, architect Minoru Yamasaki designed a special window rig for Roko Camaj. Despite initial nervousness, he grew accustomed to the heights over his 19 years on the job, even attaching his tools to his rig to prevent accidents. "We hook up everything: gloves, squeegee, except sponge. Sponge is not going to kill nobody," he said in a 1994 interview with The New York Times.

Camaj's wife was unaware of the full extent of his work until she read about it in an article a few years after he started. She was so unnerved by heights that she refused to visit the observation deck again after one visit. Camaj, however, felt secure in his harness and rig, often working at great heights without fear. In a 1999 interview with Dutch correspondent Max Westerman for RTL Nieuws, Camaj proudly spoke about his job and the unique experience of working at such heights.

Sara Krulwich of The New York Times photographed Camaj at work in August 1994. She described the experience of stepping into the rig as unforgettable, highlighting the dramatic and dangerous nature of his job. Camaj was also featured in The Sunday Times in 1998, providing an insight into his life working at 1,300 feet above ground. This profile was republished in 2022.

During the September 11 attacks, Camaj was on the 105th floor of the South Tower when it was struck by United Airlines Flight 175. He managed to call his wife, Katrina, informing her of his situation, but was unable to escape before the tower collapsed. Camaj had a key to the roof of the building, but a buzzer also had to be pressed at a security post on the 22nd floor to enable access and the post had already been evacuated. A man identified only as "Rocko", who was on the 105th floor of one tower, used a walkie talkie to report that he was in great distress. A radio dispatcher said someone would be found to help him, but he warned: "Don't let no people up here. Big smoke!" It's been suggested that this man may have been Camaj, who was on the 105th floor and had a walkie talkie.

Camaj's remains were never found or identified. He has been called the "patron saint of window washers" due to his dedication and the tragic circumstances of his death.

In the aftermath of the attacks, the community of Manhasset, where Camaj lived, was deeply affected. According to The New York Times, Manhasset lost over 40 residents, with Camaj being one of them. His son Vincent recounted that a children's book was once written about his father because his job seemed so unusual. In the book, Camaj said he came to America because people told him, "If you move there, you will have a beautiful car and a big house and there is freedom." He found peace washing windows, often saying, "I don't bother nobody and nobody bothers me. It's just me and the sky".

== Legacy ==
Roko Camaj's name is inscribed on the South Pool of the National September 11 Memorial & Museum, on Panel S-37. His life and work continue to be honored by family, friends, and colleagues. His story is a testament to the courage and dedication of those who worked at the World Trade Center.

Camaj's 1999 interview with RTL Nieuws resurfaced a few days after the attacks, when Max Westerman made a two and a half minute item about him after seeing Camaj's son on CNN. The item is still available through YouTube.

Camaj's routine and untimely death are captured in Steven Berkoff's poem "Requiem for Ground Zero." The poem juxtaposes the lives of ordinary New Yorkers, including Camaj, with the actions of the 9/11 hijackers, emphasizing his role in maintaining the Twin Towers just before the attacks. "Requiem for Ground Zero" was performed by Berkoff, a maverick writer-director known for his acerbic and often controversial works, at the Edinburgh Fringe in 2002.

Roko Camaj's life and work were also profiled in the book Window Washer: At Work Above the Clouds by Keith Elliot Greenberg, published in 1995. The book provides a detailed look at the dangerous yet essential job of window washers at the World Trade Center, highlighting Camaj's experiences and dedication.

In a Fox News article, Camaj's son shared his reaction to visiting the National 9/11 Memorial. The article highlights the emotional journey of visiting the site where his father's name is inscribed, reflecting the enduring impact of Camaj's life and legacy on his family. This visit was a poignant reminder of the personal stories behind each name on the memorial, bringing a human element to the vast tragedy of 9/11.

In a 2013 New Yorker article, it was mentioned that on September 11, three window washers were at work at the World Trade Center when the first plane struck. In the south tower, the Trade Center's veteran rig operator, Roko Camaj, and an apprentice, Fabian Soto, were cut off near the roof and killed when the building collapsed. Their surviving colleagues are convinced that in the last moments before the tower fell Camaj was trying to use the cleaning scaffold to reach safety. Joe Crookston paid tribute to Roko in a song he released on April 1, 2014 "Tuesday Morning (For Roko)" on the Album "Georgia I'm Here" Camaj was featured posthumously in The History Channel's documentary, World Trade Center: A Modern Marvel.
