= Mark Lucgjonaj =

Albanian poet and professor

- Born: August 30, 1986 (age 39); Titograd, Yugoslavia (modern: Podgorica, Montenegro )
- Citizenship: Montenegrin
- Education: Albanian language and literature
- Alma mater: University of Pristina
- Occupations: Professor, Writer, Journalist
- Writing career
- Language: Albanian
- Period: post-modernism
- Genre: Fiction
- Notable work: Humbja
- Notable awards: Rexhai Surroi award for Literature

Mark Lucgjonaj (born 30 August 1986) known by his pen name as Mark Pashku is an Albanian writer, journalist and professor of Albanian literature.

== Biography ==
Mark Lucgjonaj was born in Podgorica to an Albanian family from Malësi. He finished elementary school and high school in his hometown Tuzi to continue studies in University of Pristina in Kosovo. Mark studied Albanian language and literature, and later he finished master's degree in Luigj Gurakuqi University in Shkodër. He is the nephew of notable Gheg Albanian writer Nokë Sinishtaj.

In June 2014 Lucgjonaj published his first poetry book in Albanian Zhurma e Mendimeve (The Noise of Thoughts) and in Montenegrin Buka Misli. In 2021, he received the annual Kosovan literary award, the Rexhai Surroi Prize, for the best Albanian novel, awarded for his work Humbja (The Loss).

== Biography ==
- Zhurma e mendimeve (The Noise of Thoughts), (2014)
- Fshati i heshtjes (The Silent Village), (2016)
- Ligji i maskave (The Law of Masks), (2017)
- Humbja (The Loss), (2022)
- The Loss, translated by Veronika Dedvukaj (2023)
- Livia, edited by Albert Bikaj, (2024)
