= Nikollë Nikprelaj =

Këngetari Nikollë Nikprelaj
- Born: 12 April 1961 (age 65); Tuzi, PR Montenegro, FPR Yugoslavia
- Origin: Triesh
- Genres: Albanian folkloric

Nikolle Nikprelaj (born 12 April 1961) is an Albanian singer from Tuzi, Montenegro. Nikolle began his professional career in his late teens. He is now the lead singer for the Albanian folk group "Besa Trieshit", which has won first place in Albanian concerts and festivals in Montenegro, Kosovo and Albania. Nikprelaj plays several traditional instruments, including the lahuta, çiftelia, sharkia, and the bylbyli (flute). He plays traditional Albanian music featuring his instruments and vocals.

Nikprelaj took second place in the song contest Polifestit 2008 and the RTV21 award for his song "Syrin mos ia shkel" (translated "Eye Not to Tread"). He also performs concerts to provide humanitarian aid to organizations benefiting children with special needs.

== Discography ==
=== Albums ===
- Në maje t'bjeshkëve të Malësisë ('On top of the mountains of Malësia')
- Oj Lulja e Malësisë ('Oh flower of Malësia', referring to a girl)
- Dora e pajtimit ('The hands of reconciliation')
- Nuk kem tjetër vec një nënë ('We don't have no other, but one mother')
- Endërra ime ('My dream')
- U knoft hymni gjithëkombëtar ('May the national anthem be sung to all its natives')
- Fukaraja ('Poor person', referring to poor in love)
- Pa titull ('Without a title')
- Çlirimtarët kokë për tokë ('Liberators' heads to the ground')
- Folk 2000 ('Folk 2000')
- Ti s'ke shpirt ('You don't have a soul')
- Live ('Live')
- Kangë dhe Potpuri Dasmash ('Wedding Songs and Mix') (2009)
- Hidhe Vallen ('Start Dancing') (2010)
- Ndal ('Stop') (2010)
- Ani, Ani ('Have it your way') (2012)
- Dasma Jonë ('Our Wedding') (2013)
- Këngë e Atmosferë ('Songs and Atmosphere') (2014)
- Zemren Ma Ke Thy (‘You Broke My Heart’) (2018)
