= Nikmaraš =

Nikmaraš Никмараш Nikmarashi
- Settlement
- Location within Montenegro
- Coordinates: 42°26′19″N 19°26′06″E
- Country: Montenegro
- Municipality: Tuzi

Population (2011)
  - Total: 10
- Time zone: UTC+1 (CET)
  - Summer (DST): UTC+2 (CEST)
- Postal code: 81304
- Area code: 081
- Vehicle registration: PG

Nikmaraš (Cyrillic: Никмараш; Albanian: Nikmarashi) is a settlement in the rural community of Zatrijebač, in the municipality of Tuzi, Montenegro, near the border with Albania. It is part of the wider Kuči clan region, specifically in the Zatrijebač region (alb. Triesh, part of wider Malësia from Albanian point of view). The village owes its name to the Zatrijebač chieftain Nik Maraš (Nik Marashi).

== Geography ==
Nikmaraš is located east of the capital. The Sjevik hill lies within the settlement. The settlement is one of 6 villages of the Albanian-inhabited Zatrijebač region (Trieshi), along with Mužečka, Šćepova (alb. Stjepohi), Banjkani (alb. Benkaj), Deljani (alb. Delaj) and Budza.

== History ==
In the past, Nikmaraš was the largest of all ten Zatrijebač villages, but today the largest is said to be the village of Šćepova (also known to be the tribal center). According to Montenegrin census records, Nikmaraš, around the mid-19th century was said to have around 70 households. At this time, locals called Nikmaraš by the name of "Shkodra e Vogel" to relate to its size compared to the city of Shkoder in North Albania. Lul Nika, Cac Nika and Mark Nika were the sons of Nik Marashi. The villages consists six of the following surnames; Arapaj, Cacaj, Gjeloshaj, Gjonaj, Gjurashaj & Margilaj. Most of the village natives either moved to other towns or cities within Montenegro, but most natives found themselves a better lifestyle within the borders of the United States.

== Demographics ==
According to the 2003 census, the village had 13 inhabitants, all ethnic Albanians.

According to the 2011 census, its population was 10.
