= Dinoša mulberry tree =

Tree that gushes water in Montenegro

Coordinates: 42°25′06″N 19°20′12″E

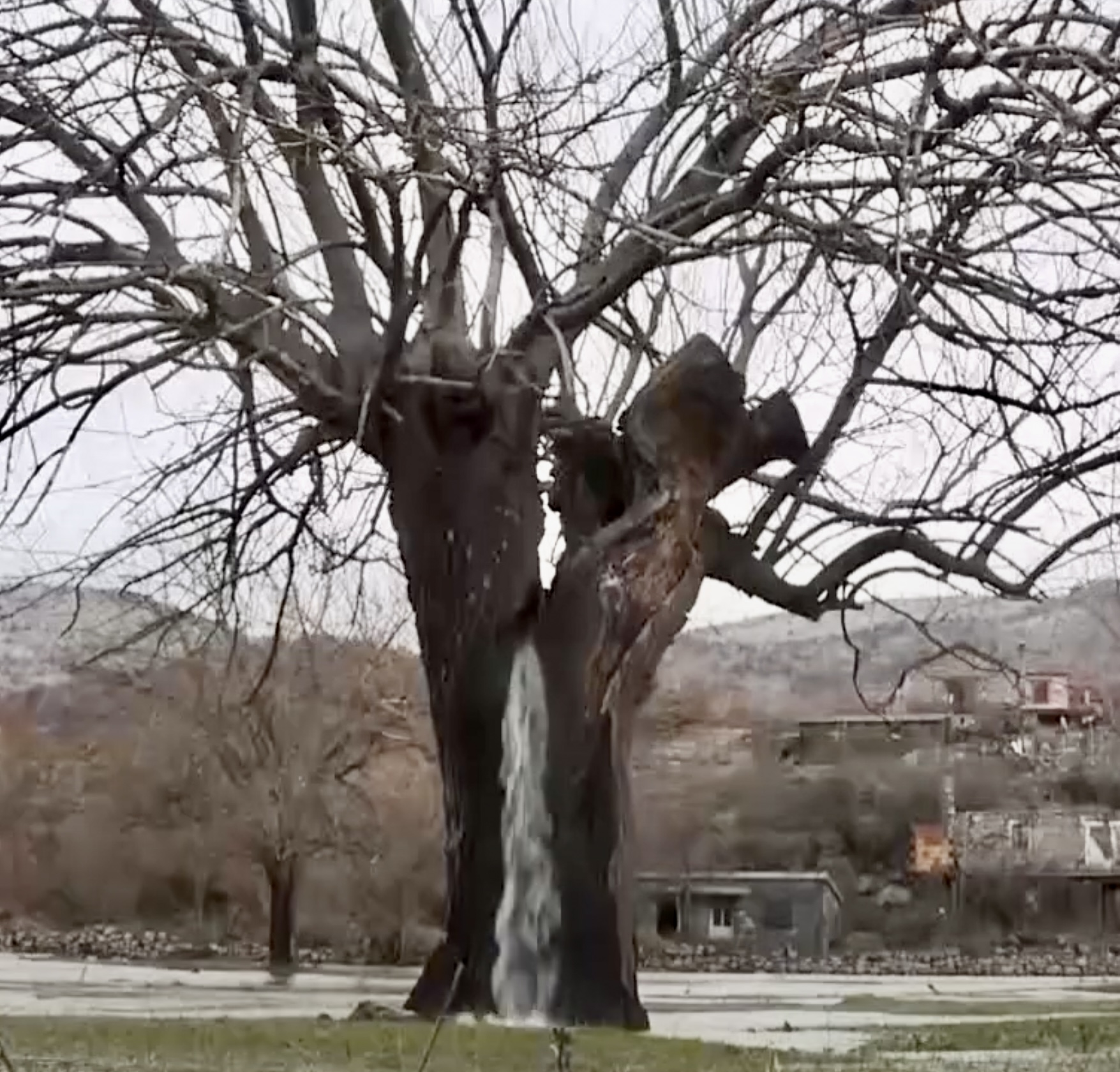
Dinoša mulberry tree

The Dinoša mulberry tree is a mulberry tree in the village of Dinoša, Montenegro, which gushes water from its trunk after heavy rainfall. It is thought that groundwater from a spring forces its way through a cavity in the tree. The phenomenon first occurred in the 1990s, and is said to occur once a year.

== Background ==
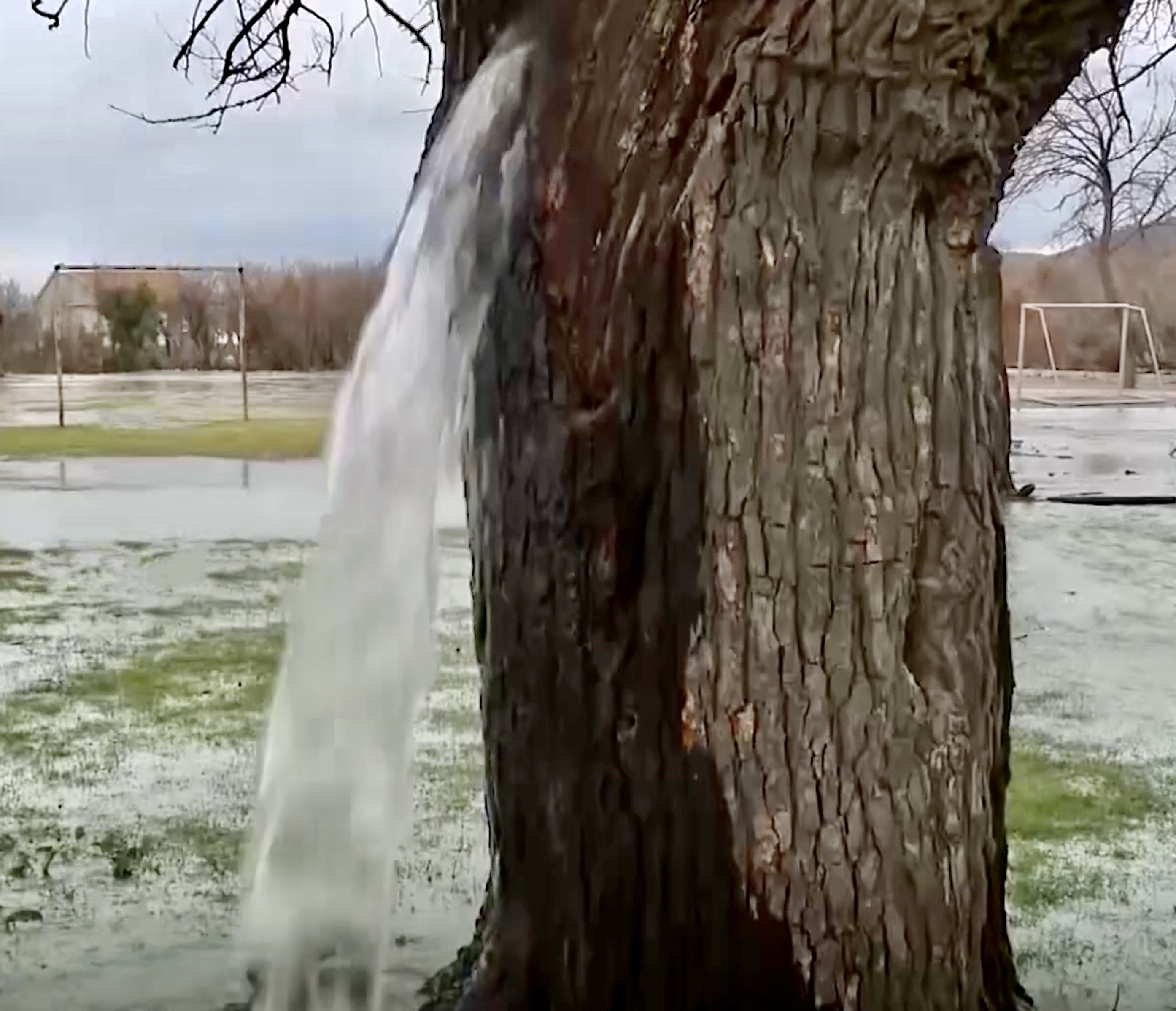
Water gushing from the trunk of the mulberry tree

Dinoša is a village in the southeastern European country of Montenegro, around 5 km (3.1 mi) east of the capital Podgorica. The mulberry tree was estimated to be around 100 to 150 years old as of 2022. It is thought that there are underground springs which become overwhelmed with water during heavy rains, especially during the spring and autumn. When the groundwater pressure builds it forces the water through a hollowed-out portion of the tree, pouring out of the trunk at a height of approximately 1.5 metres (4.9 ft). The phenomenon is said to occur once a year. Residents of Dinoša have observed the occurrence since the 1990s.

The area around Dinoša has multiple streams that are fed by spring snowmelt, and an underground spring. The mulberry tree is located above reservoirs near the bank of a river. The hollows of the tree act as a relief valve for the pressure of the underground water. Following heavy rainfall, water flows from the tree for a few days while the pressure from the underground water flows are relieved through the cavity in the trunk.

== See also ==
- List of individual trees
- Lists of trees
