= Skorać =

Skorać Скораћ Skorraq
- Village
- Location within Montenegro
- Coordinates: 42.367626°N 19.390230°E
- Country: Montenegro
- Municipality: Tuzi

Population (2011)
  - Total: 137
- Time zone: UTC+1 (CET)
  - Summer (DST): UTC+2 (CEST)

Skorać (Cyrillic: Скораћ; Albanian: Skorraq) is a village in the municipality of Tuzi, Montenegro. It is located close to the Albanian border.

== Demographics ==
According to the 2011 census, its population was 137, all of them Albanians.
