= Church of St. Anthony, Tuzi =

Coordinates: 42°21′52.9″N 19°19′45.7″E

The Church of St. Anthony (Albanian: Kisha e Shna Ndout, Kisha e Shën Antonit, Montenegrin: Crkva svetog Anta/Antuna), or simply Church of Tuzi (Kisha e Tuzit), is a Franciscan Roman Catholic church located in the center of the town of Tuzi, near Podgorica, Montenegro, serving mostly the Albanian community. It was built between 1930 and 1999, based on the Zagreb Cathedral.
