= Vuksanlekići =

Vuksanlekići Вуксанлекићи Vuksanlekaj
- Village
- Location within Montenegro
- Coordinates: 42.337346°N 19.339924°E
- Country: Montenegro
- Municipality: Tuzi

Population (2011)
  - Total: 267
- Time zone: UTC+1 (CET)
  - Summer (DST): UTC+2 (CEST)

Vuksanlekići (Cyrillic: Вуксанлекићи; Albanian: Vuksanlekaj) is a village in the municipality of Tuzi, Montenegro.

The settlement of Vuksanlekaj, for its part, is said to have been founded by one Vuksa, son of Leka, around the year 1788.

== Demographics ==
According to the 2011 census, its population was 267, all but 5 of them Albanians.

Vuksanlekaj is inhabited predominantly by the Albanian Camaj family of the Hoti tribe.

== Notable people ==
- Gjyste Vulaj, Albanian singer
