= Podhum, Tuzi =

Podhum Подхум Nënhelm
- Village
- Location within Montenegro
- Coordinates: 42.309698°N 19.338644°E
- Country: Montenegro
- Municipality: Tuzi

Population (2011)
  - Total: 253
- Time zone: UTC+1 (CET)
  - Summer (DST): UTC+2 (CEST)

Podhum (Serbian Cyrillic: Подхум; Albanian: Nënhelm) is a village in the municipality of Tuzi, Montenegro. It is located just north of Lake Skadar.

== Demographics ==
According to the 2011 census, its population was 253.

Ethnicity in 2011
Ethnicity	Number	Percentage
Albanians	221	87.5%
Serbs	24	9.5%
other/undeclared	8	3.2%
Total	279	100%
