= Gornji Milješ =

Gornji Milješ Горњи Миљеш Milesh i Sipërm
- Village
- Location within Montenegro
- Coordinates: 42°23′52″N 19°19′37″E
- Country: Montenegro
- Municipality: Tuzi

Population (2011)
  - Total: 742
- Time zone: UTC+1 (CET)
  - Summer (DST): UTC+2 (CEST)

Gornji Milješ (Cyrillic: Горњи Миљеш; Albanian: Milesh i Sipërm) is a village in the municipality of Tuzi, Montenegro.

== Demographics ==
According to the 2003 census, it had a population of 672.

According to the 2011 census, its population was 742.

Ethnicity in 2011
Ethnicity	Number	Percentage
Albanians	714	96.2%
Montenegrins	7	0.9%
other/undeclared	21	2.8%
Total	742	100%
