= Çifteli =

Plucked string instrument with only two strings

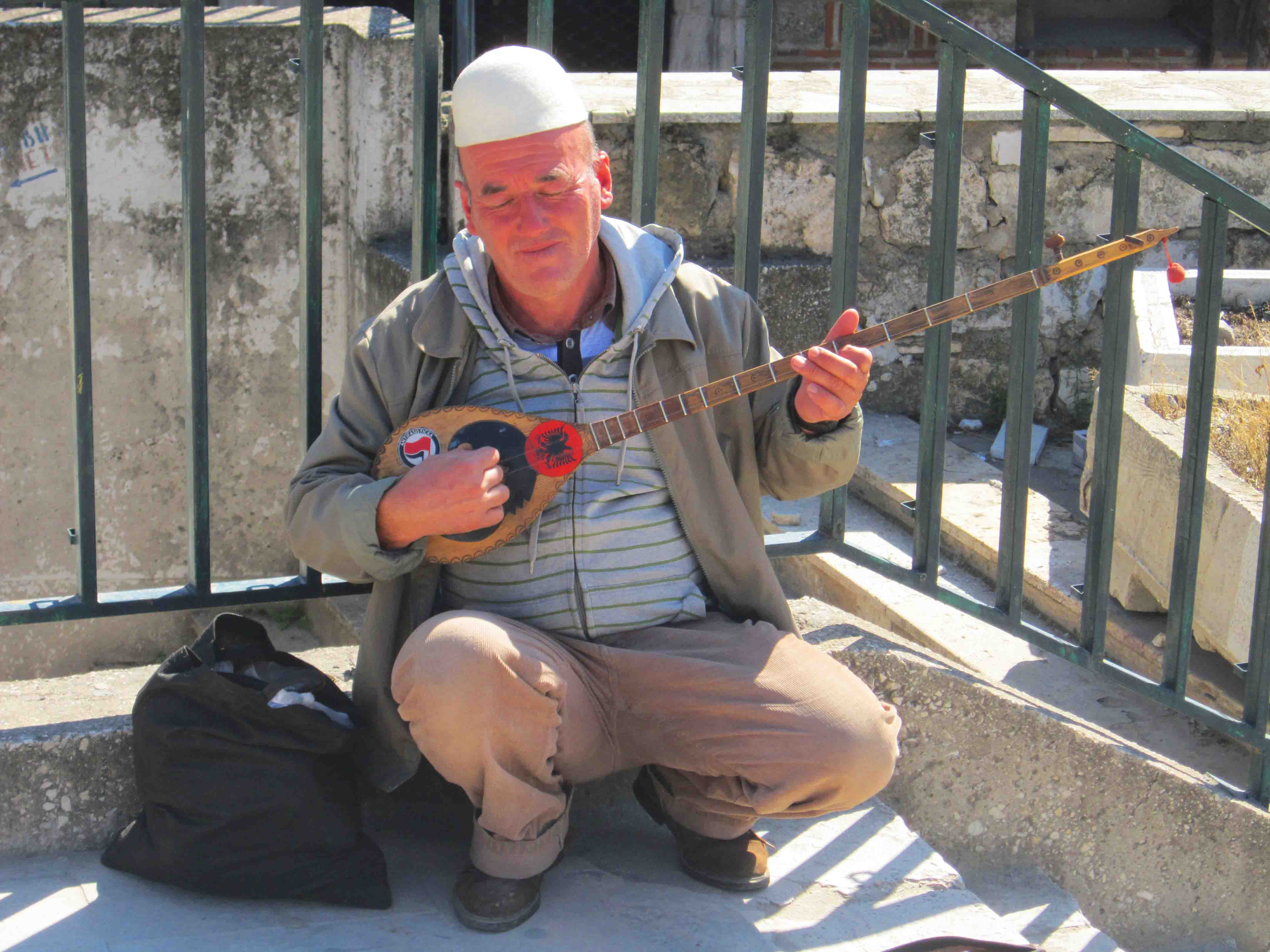
- Albanian man playing a çifteli

String instrument
- Other names: Çiftetelli saz
- Classification: Plucked string instrument; fretted lute
- Hornbostel–Sachs classification: 321.321-5 (Fretted pear-shaped bowl lute with a neck, played by plucking.)
- Developed: Albanian speaking areas

Çifteli

The çifteli, çiftetelli, çifttelli saz (Turkish: 'doubled', 'double stringed saz', Albanian: çiftelia, qifteli ) is a plucked string instrument, with only two strings. It is played by Albanians in Albania, Kosovo, North Macedonia.

The çifteli is a common folk instrument played in weddings and at concerts similar to the related instruments like bağlama or cura. It is mainly used in folk music (in particular Albanian folk music) as well as in various musical styles such as the performances of Nikollë Nikprelaj. It is also used to accompany Albanian epics and ballads.

== Construction ==
Çifteli vary in size, but are most often tuned to B_{3} and E_{4} (comparable to the top two strings of a guitar, which is classically tuned as "E_{2} A_{2} D_{3} G_{3} B_{3} E_{4}"). Usually the lower string is played as a drone, with the melody played on the higher string. The çifteli is a fretted instrument, but unlike most, it is not fretted in a chromatic scale (one fret per semitone), but rather in a diatonic scale, with seven notes to the octave.

The çifteli is a microtonal instrument, with makam Hüseyni being used on some çiftelis.

== Etymology ==
The term çifteli and çiftetelli are derived from Turkish çift ('double') and tel ('wire', 'string'), with the Turkish suffix -li ('with'), so çiftetelli means 'with doubled strings', it takes the name from the number of strings used.

== History ==
Being a Albanian folk instrument the çifteli originates from Balkan Peninsula particularly from Albanian speaking territories. The instrument delivers a unique melody, sound and also acts as accompany instrument to singing. The çifteli is closely related and similar to other common stringed instruments like the bağlama, cura, balkan tambura in many aspects but has its unique sound and character. It is also can be regarded as unique instrument rather than a modification or a derivative of common stringed instruments.

== See also ==
- Tzouras
- Dutar, a Central Asian instrument, whose name means "two strings" in Persian
- Baglama
- Šargija, a baglama-like Balkan instrument
- Tanbur
- Setar
