= Krševo =

Krševo Këshevë
- Village
- Krševo; Кршево
- Location within Montenegro
- Coordinates: 42.393408°N 19.363964°E
- Country: Montenegro
- Municipality: Tuzi

Population (2011)
  - Total: 164
- Time zone: UTC+1 (CET)
  - Summer (DST): UTC+2 (CEST)

Krševo (Cyrillic: Кршево; Albanian: Këshevë) is a village in the municipality of Tuzi, Montenegro.

== Demographics ==
According to the 2011 census, its population was 164, all but 5 of them Albanians.
