= Tuzi =

City in Montenegro

Tuzi Tuzi / Тузи Tuz
- Town and municipality
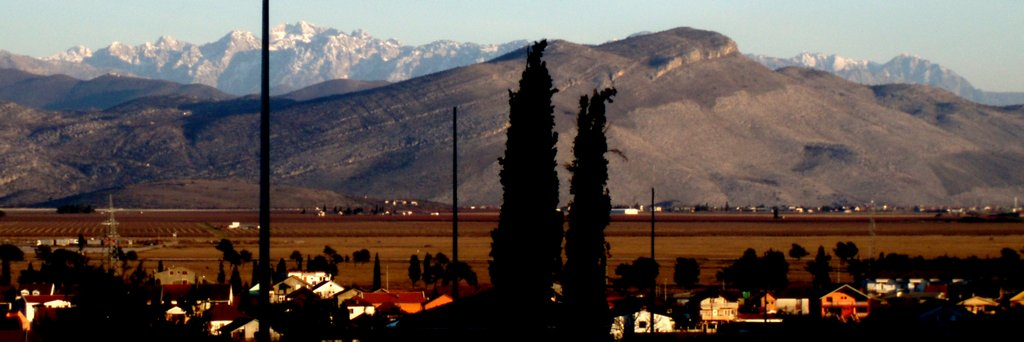
- View of the Accursed Mountains

- Flag Coat of arms

- Location within Montenegro
- Coordinates: 42°21′56″N 19°19′53″E
- Country: Montenegro
- Municipality: Tuzi
- Established: 2019

Government
  - Type: Mayor-Assembly
  - Mayor: Lindon Gjelaj (AA)

Population (2011)
  - Urban: 4,748
  - Rural: 6,674
  - Municipality: 11,422
- Time zone: UTC+1 (CET)
  - Summer (DST): UTC+2 (CEST)
- Postal code: 81206
- Area code: +382 20
- Vehicle registration: TZ
- Climate: Cfa
- Website: tuzi.org.me

Tuzi (Albanian: Tuz; Cyrillic: Тузи) is a small town in the central region of Montenegro, and the seat of Tuzi Municipality. It is located along a main road between the city of Podgorica and the Albanian border crossing, just a few kilometers north of Lake Skadar. The Church of St. Anthony and Qazimbeg's Mosque are located in the centre of the town.

== Geography ==
Tuzi is situated to the northwest of Lake Shkodra.

== History ==
The town of Tuzi is situated in southeastern Montenegro, between Podgorica and the Skadar lake. The Albanian community of Tuzi descend from the surrounding tribes of Hoti, Gruda, Trieshi and Koja, which are part of the Malësor tribes.

Tuzi was mentioned in 1330 in the Dečani chrysobulls as part of the Albanian (arbanas) katun (semi-nomadic pastoral community) of Llesh Tuzi (Ljesa Tuzi in the original), in an area stretching southwards from modern Tuzi Municipality along the Lake Skadar to a village near modern Koplik. This katund included many communities that later formed their own separate communities: Reçi and his sons, Matagushi, Bushati and his sons, Pjetër Suma and Pjetër Kuçi, first known ancestor of Kuči. Llesh Tuzi is the first named progenitor of the Tuzi tribe (fis), which gave its name to the settlement of Tuzi. The Suma and Tuzi fis formed the vast majority of the later Gruda community.

Tuzi was documented in the Ottoman defter of 1485 as part of the Timar of Hasan Arnauti, with 24 houses and 6 bachelors. Albanian anthroponomy dominated amongst the inhabitants of Tuzi, with names such as Leka, Ulku, Deda, Nika, Pali etc.

Following the Great Schism of 1054, the tribes of Tuzi embraced Roman Catholicism over Eastern Orthodoxy. Following the expansion of Ottoman rule in the Balkans in the 14th century, many gradually converted to Islam. Some of them adopted new surnames common among Ottoman Muslims while others kept their original surnames. Albanian surnames present among Muslim and Christian families alike include Gjokaj, Nikaj, Dreshaj, etc.

The Albanian flag was raised for the first time in possibly over 400 years in the Battle of Deçiq (6 April 1911) in the Albanian revolt of 1911 in the Deçiq mountain near Tuzi. It was raised by Ded Gjo Luli on the peak of Bratila after victory was secured. The phrase "Tash o vllazën do t’ju takojë të shihni atë që për 450 vjet se ka pa kush" (Now brothers you have earned the right to see that which has been unseen for 450 years) has been attributed to Ded Gjo Luli by later memoirs of those who were present when he raised the flag. It was one of three banners brought to Malësia by Palokë Traboini, student in Austria. The other two banners were used by Ujka of Gruda and Prelë Luca of Triepshi.

During the Islamization of the region, the area had a mixed Slavic-Albanian composition of names. For example, Mahmut and Husein were sons of Abdulah, Osman which was the son of Živo, then Ibrahim and then Gojaš. In Gruda, Hizar was the son of Vučin which was the son of Mezid which's father was Gjergj. Similar patterns continue like this with Gjon and Stojan.

=== 21st century ===
Tuzi was the first municipality in Montenegro that was put into complete lockdown during the COVID-19 pandemic.

== Sports ==
Tuzi's local football club is Dečić, who play in the Montenegrin First League. Their home venue is the Stadion Tuško Polje and their reserve team plays in the Montenegrin Third League. The local basketball team is KB Deçiq which competes in the highest tier Prva A Liga.

== Demographics ==
According to 2011 census, the town of Tuzi has a population of 4,748, while Tuzi Municipality has 11,422 residents.

Ethnicity in 2011
Ethnicity	Number	Percentage
Albanians	2,383	50.2%
Bosniaks	932	19.6%
Montenegrins	554	11.7%
Roma	111	2.3%
Turks	15	0.3%
Serbs	13	0.3%
Egyptians	6	0.1%
other/undeclared	734	15.5%
Total	4,748	100%

== International relations ==
=== Twin towns — Sister cities ===
Tuzi is twinned with:

- Rochester Hills, United States
