= Pretash Zeka Ulaj =

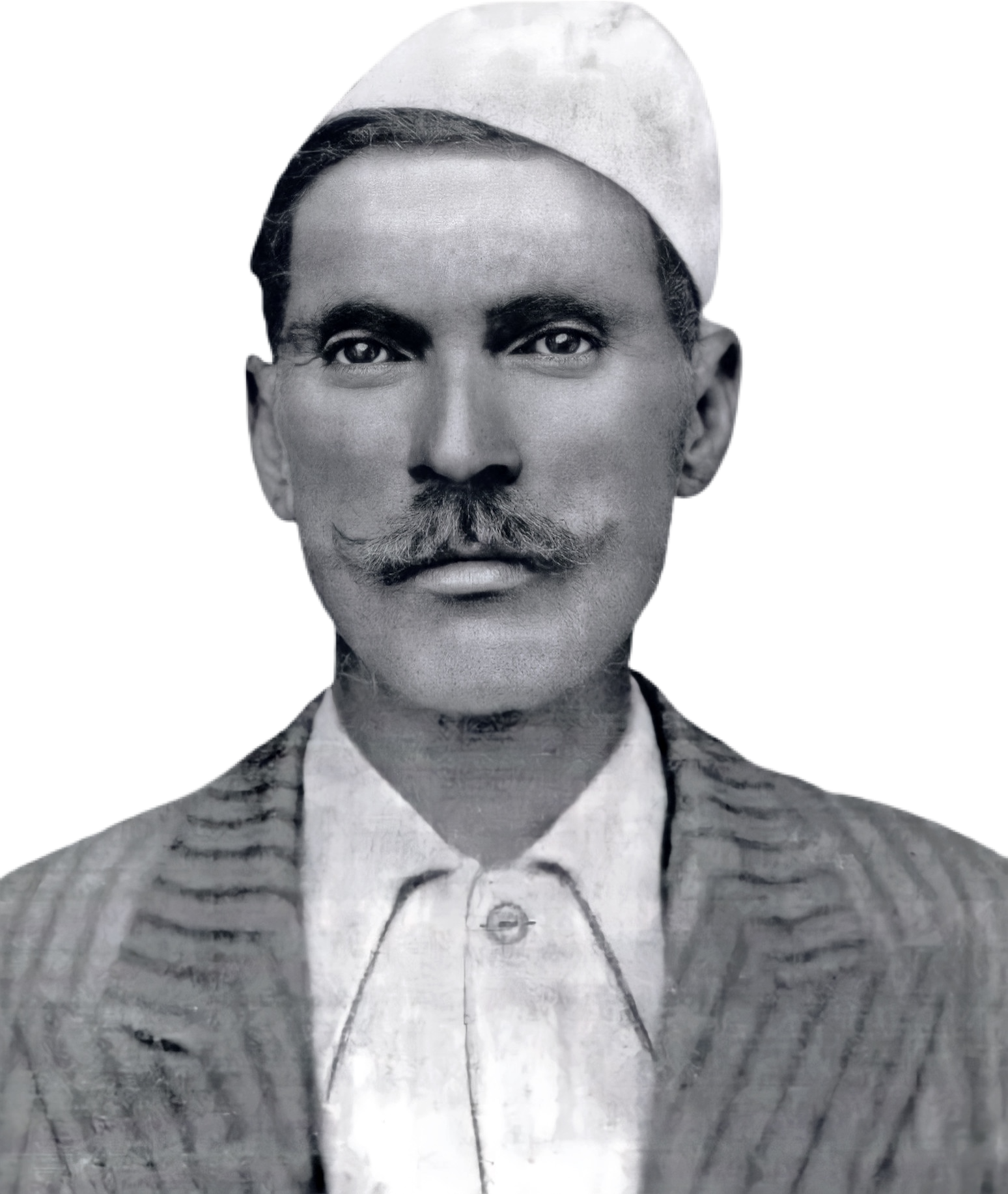
Pretash Zeka

Pretash Zeka Ulaj (1882–1962) was an Albanian military figure in the Albanian Revolt of 1911. He was the bajraktar (flag-bearer) of Koja e Kuçit in Montenegro. He was distinguished Battle of Deçiq, fought near Tuzi in 1911 between Albanian highlanders and the Ottoman troops of Shefket Turgut Pasha.

== Life ==
Pretash was born in Kojë (Koći), an Albanian-inhabited village in eastern Montenegro, close to the border of Albania, the second oldest of the 11 sons of Zek Nika Ulaj. His brothers also helped defend their border town against advancing Turks and Slavs into the Albanian Malësia region.

Pretash was the leader of the Kojë brotherhood (of the village of Kojë), an Albanian enclave within the Kuči mountain of Montenegro. On April 6, 1911, the Malësor Warriors led by Ded Gjo Luli reached the top of the strategic peak of Deçiq at the Battle of Deçiq. Many died that day and the Ottomans were defeated. About a year and a half later, the Albanian flag was risen officially in the southern town of Vlora.

Since 2004, a bust of him stands in his home village Koja in Tuzi Municipality.

His ancestral genealogy is as follows (in reverse): Pretash Zeka Zek Nika Nik Marashi Marash Ula
