= Koći =

Koje / Koći Коћи Kojë
- Village
- Location within Montenegro
- Coordinates: 42°27′38″N 19°24′13″E
- Country: Montenegro
- Municipality: Tuzi

Population (2011)
  - Total: 54
- Time zone: UTC+1 (CET)
  - Summer (DST): UTC+2 (CEST)
- Area code: +382 20
- Car plates: PG

Koći (Montenegrin Cyrillic: Коћи; Albanian: Kojë) is a village in the municipality of Tuzi, Montenegro, near the border with Albania. The village is inhabited by ethnic Albanians of the Roman Catholic faith.

== Geography ==
Koći lies east of the capital Podgorica, south of Ubli. Koći is a village in Koja e Kuçit, eastern Montenegro, bordering Albania.

Along with Albanian-inhabited Hoti and Gruda, Koći is, from Albanian point of view, part of the wider Malësia-region (Malesija).

== History ==
At the beginning of the Montenegrin–Ottoman War, the Kuči rose up against the Ottomans, who started dispatching soldiers at the frontier, including at Koći.

According to Spiridon Gopčević, the area of Koći included 10 km^{2} and 550 inhabitants, out of which 480 were Catholics, 40 Orthodox, and 25 Muslims (1877).

=== 20th century ===
Traveler Arso Milatović (who wrote a travel book on his experiences 1935–45) stayed at Koći and described it as "a village neighbouring Malesia, misplaced and rugged, which a horse can't reach, thus donkeys and mules walk the rocks as squirrels on branches". The inhabitants were Catholics, and the village had a church and priest, fra Marko. A church was built by the ethnic Albanian migrant workers who left the village for Europe in the period of 1964–74. The village population has since massively decreased.

Demographic history
Ethnic group	1948	1953	1961	1971	1981	1991	2003	2011
Albanians			411	501	301		73	48
Montenegrins			35	19	77		8	
Yugoslavs				15	4			
Undeclared/ Others				1	4			6
Total	416	471	446	536	386	237	91	54

=== Culture ===
Some Albanian Catholics have the custom of family and tribe celebration of saints (called festa in Peja), as is found in the Serbian Orthodox tradition of krsna slava.

== Notable people ==
- Pretash Zeka Ulaj (1882-1962), commander in the Battle of Deçiq against the Ottoman Empire.
