= Battle of Agri Pass =

1910 battle between Albanian rebels and Ottoman forces

- Part of Albanian revolt of 1910
Date	13–27 July 1910
Location	Agri Pass, Scutari Vilayet, Ottoman Empire
Result	Albanian victory

Belligerents
Albanian rebels	Ottoman Empire

Commanders and leaders
Prelë Tuli; Mehmet Shpendi; Marash Delia	Shevket Turgut Pasha

Strength
400–500	3,000

Casualties and losses
None	Unknown

The Battle of Agri Pass (Albanian: Beteja e Qafës së Agrit) was fought between Albanian rebels and Ottoman forces during the Revolt of 1910. The clash represented a military offensive launched by Shevket Turgut Pasha against Albanian rebels that were blocking the Agri Pass in the Bajrak of Nikaj-Mërtur. The Ottomans were defeated.

According to Albanian sources the Albanians rebels attacked 3,000 Ottomans with 400-500 irregular soldiers. The Albanians suffered no casualties.

== Background ==
In 1910 the Young Turk Ottoman government imposed new centralization policies in Albania, which resulted in the Albanian revolt of 1910. The Rebels were supported by the Kingdom of Serbia. New taxes levied in the early months of 1910 led to Isa Boletini's activity to convince Albanian leaders who had already been involved in a 1909 uprising to try another revolt against the Ottoman Empire. The Albanian attacks on the Ottomans in Priştine (now Pristina) and Ferizovik (now Ferizaj), the killing of the Ottoman commander in İpek (now Peja), and the insurgents blocking of the railway to Skopje at the Kaçanik Pass led to the Ottoman government's declaration of martial law in the area.

Days before the Battle in the Agri Pass, the Albanians were defeated in the Battle of Morinë Pass, Battle of Carraleva Pass and Battle of Kaçanik Pass.

== Aftermath ==
Unable to repress their resistance in the Agri Pass, the Ottoman column took another way to Scutari, passing from the Pukë region. On July 24, 1910, Ottoman forces entered the city of Scutari (now known as Shkodër). During this period martial courts were put in action and summary executions took place. A large number of firearms were collected and many villages and properties were burned by the Ottoman army.

== See also ==
- Albanian revolt of 1912
- Malësor tribes revolt of 1917

== Sources ==
- Akçam, Taner (2004), From empire to republic: Turkish nationalism and the Armenian genocide, Zed Books, ISBN 978-1-84277-527-1
- Elsie, Robert (2004), Historical dictionary of Kosova, Scarecrow Press, ISBN 978-0-8108-5309-6
- Finkel, Caroline (2006), Osman's dream: the story of the Ottoman Empire, 1300–1923, Basic Books, ISBN 978-0-465-02396-7
- Frashëri, Kristo (1984), Historia e popullit shqiptar në katër vëllime (in Albanian), vol. II, Tiranë, OCLC 255273594
- Gawrych, George Walter (2006), The crescent and the eagle: Ottoman rule, Islam and the Albanians, 1874–1913, I.B.Tauris, ISBN 978-1-84511-287-5
- Jelavich, Barbara (1983), History of the Balkans: Twentieth century, Cambridge University Press, ISBN 978-0-521-27459-3
- Pearson, Owen (2004), Albania and King Zog: independence, republic and monarchy 1908–1939, I.B.Tauris, ISBN 978-1-84511-013-0
- Karpat, Kemal (3 May 2001), The Politicization of Islam: Reconstructing Identity, State, Faith, and Community in the Late Ottoman State, Oxford University Press, ISBN 978-0-19-028576-0
- Bloxham, Donald (2005), The Great Game of Genocide: Imperialism, Nationalism, and the Destruction of the Ottoman Armenians, OUP Oxford, ISBN 978-0-19-150044-2
