= Ivezaj =

Ivezaj is a surname. Notable people with the surname include:

- Sokol Baci Ivezaj, Albanian rebel
- Tringe Smajli Martini Ivezaj, Albanian rebel
