= Dušići =

Dušići Душићи Dushiqi
- Village
- Location within Montenegro
- Country: Montenegro
- Municipality: Tuzi

Population (2011)
  - Total: 188
- Time zone: UTC+1 (CET)
  - Summer (DST): UTC+2 (CEST)

Dušići (Cyrillic: Душићи; Albanian: Dushiqi), formerly Dečići (Albanian: Deçiqi), is a village in the municipality of Tuzi, Montenegro. It became well known during the Albanian Revolt of 1911 with the Battle of Dečić. Robert Elsie puts the location around 3 km southwest of Tuzi. Right across the border with Albania, there is Koplik, the largest town in the Albanian region of Malësia.

== Demographics ==
According to the 2011 census, its population was 188.

Ethnicity in 2011
Ethnicity	Number	Percentage
Albanians	175	93.1%
Montenegrins	12	6.4%
other/undeclared	1	0.5%
Total	188	100%
