= Smajl Martini Ivezaj =

Albanian bajraktar from the Grude tribe

- Born: c.1850 Grudë, Malesia, Ottoman Albania
- Died: 1889; Diyarbakır
- Occupations: Defender and military bajraktar of the Albanian forces.
- Years active: 1870 - 1889
- Known for: Fighting Ottoman occupiers.
- Family: Tringe Smajli

Smajl Martini Ivezaj (born ca. 1850, Grudë, Ottoman Albania - dead 1889 Diyarbakır) was an Albanian bajraktar from the Grude tribe who led the Albanian forces against the ottomans and montenegrins. He led his forces against Montenegrins and Ottomans throughout his life, and his deeds were heard of in "The New York Times" in 1911. His daughter, the famous Tringe Smajli, replaced him during the Battle of Vranje in 1911 and the Albanian forces were victorious. He hailed from the patriotic Ivezaj family, his great grandfather being Prec Vuksani known for battles against the Ottomans during the 1780s and his uncle Bac Vuksani known for the battle against Montenegro in Zabljak Crnojevic in 1835.

== Life ==
At the age of 17, he lost his father Martin Vuksani. He led many victorious forces all around Northern Albania against the Ottomans. The Ottomans, being unable to defeat his forces, followed his activities and captured him in 1883 where he was temporarily isolated. In 1886 the military court of the Sultan sentenced him, together with his men Ded Ula, Ujk Dushi, Shabe Smaku, Gic Gila, Prek Gjetja, Lulash Deda and Luce Preka to eternal banishment. Much of the history about the Gruda and Hoti tribes were documented by the author Toni Assagazino, who in 1780 wrote of the Malsia Highlands struggle. In 1856, he wrote about the roles of the bajraktars had to protect Albanian lands. According to Andrija Jovicecic, Smajl Martini continued to fight the Montenegrin occupiers with the same force as he did when fighting the Turks. His struggle was heard of in America, and "The New York Times" wrote of his bravery on 21 May 1911. His two sons, Gjon and Zef were killed in battle with Montenegrins in Vranj. Small Martini is today a venerated figure amongst Albanians.

The Rebellion of Malësia e Mbishkodrës (1882–1886)

The Rebellion of Malësia e Mbishkodrës was an uprising in the northern Albanian highlands against Ottoman rule between 1882 and 1886, centered in the tribal regions of Hoti, Gruda, and Kastrati. The conflict developed in the context of border disputes involving Montenegro, local resistance to territorial concessions, and Ottoman efforts to reassert control over the region.[1] Background By late 1881, tribes in Hoti, Gruda, and Kastrati had begun coordinating their opposition to Montenegrin expansion and to any transfer of territory they regarded as part of their ancestral lands. A raid by men from Hoti on Golubovci in June 1882, followed by what was described as a limited Ottoman response, contributed to the belief among local leaders that armed resistance remained possible.[1] During late 1882, reports of foreign agitation and expectations of possible Austro-Hungarian support circulated in the highlands. These expectations, together with growing concern over Ottoman-Montenegrin border arrangements, intensified local tensions.[1] Uprising On 25 January 1883, Smajl Martin, the bajraktar of Gruda, reportedly declared that loyalty to the Ottoman sultan depended on the protection of Malësia from Montenegro. By April 1883, fears of a secret border settlement had contributed to open defiance, and a defensive league was formed in Kastrati.[1] Major clashes between tribal fighters and Ottoman forces took place in June 1883. Ottoman troops under Hafız Pasha suppressed the resistance with superior numbers and artillery, bringing the organized phase of the uprising to an end.[1] A ceasefire was announced on 18 June 1883, and a verbal amnesty was reportedly offered. Several leaders, however, were said to distrust the terms and did not regard the offer as secure.[1] Suppression and reprisals In the months following the ceasefire, Ottoman authorities shifted from battlefield operations to punitive measures. Contemporary accounts describe villages being burned, livestock being confiscated, bounties being offered for leaders, and pressure being applied to the families of insurgents.[1] In October 1883, the wife and daughters of Smajl Martin were reportedly arrested and imprisoned in Tuzi after Ottoman forces located the house in which they had taken refuge. Accounts state that the property was surrounded, its occupants were detained, and the house was later looted and burned.[1] On 3 November 1883, Smajl Martin surrendered after negotiations that were linked in contemporary accounts to threats against his family. According to those accounts, he stated that his resistance had been intended to prevent territorial concessions to Montenegro.[1] Further village burnings and confiscations were reported in November 1883. A number of captured figures, including Smajl Martin Ivezaj, Shab Smaku Berishaj, Dede Ula Lulgjuraj, Ujk Dushi Kalaj, Gic Gila Ivezaj, Lulash Deda Ivezaj, Prek Gjetja Ivezaj, and Luc Preka Ivezaj, were said to have been detained first in Shkodra and later sent to the prison at Diyarbakir. According to local accounts, only Ujk Dushi later returned to Malësia.[1] Aftermath By early 1884, Ottoman hostility toward Sokol Baci of Gruda was described as especially strong, reflecting broader suspicion of Catholic tribal leaders involved in the resistance. Although pardons for some fugitives were discussed, amnesty appears to have been delayed and unevenly applied through 1884 and 1885.[1] The rebellion has been remembered in local historical narratives as an example of resistance to territorial loss and of the harsh reprisals used to suppress tribal opposition in the late Ottoman period.[1] References [1] Engelbert Deusch, “The uprising in Malësia e Mbishkodrës of 1883 and the relationship of Albanian Catholics to Austria-Hungary,” Südost-Forschungen, vol. 63–64 (2004/2005), pp. 261–301. Available via Central and Eastern European Online Library (CEEOL).

== Death ==
Smajl Martini was kidnapped after Lidhja e Prizrenit 1878-1881 in the year of 1883 by Ottomans and was never heard of again. He was most likely killed.
