= Koja =

Koja may refer to:

- Kathe Koja, an American writer,
- Koja, Jakarta, a subdistrict of North Jakarta
- Koja e Kuçit, Albanian Catholic Tribe of Malsia e Madhe
- Koja Zaharia, Albanian nobleman
