= Sokol Baci =

Albanian chief of the Gruda and rebel against Ottoman rule

Sokol Baci Ivezaj / Sokol Baci
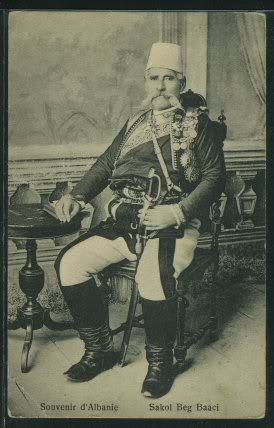
- Born: 1837; Gruda, Sanjak of Scutari, Ottoman Empire (now Montenegro)
- Died: 1920 (aged 82–83); Shkodër, Albania
- Burial place: Gruda
- Military career
- Allegiance: Ottoman Empire (before 1870s–1877); Albanian League (1878-1884); Principality of Montenegro(1884–1913); Northern Albanian (Malissor) tribes (1837-1920)
- Service years: 1870s–1913
- Rank: Commander (bajraktar); Brigadier-general (Montenegro)
- Commands: Gruda clan (Ottoman Empire) Abdul Hamid's Albanian guard (before 1876); Scutari (1913–)
- Conflicts: Albanian Revolt of 1911 and Battle of Deçiq

Sokol Baci (1837–1920) was the chief of the Gruda, a northern Albanian tribe in the vicinity of Podgorica (now Montenegro). Originally, he had served the Ottoman sultan in his personal guard, but switched sides after he was mistreated, and fought the Ottoman forces in the Sanjak of Scutari. After his clan was defeated and subjugated, he was exiled and sought refuge in Montenegro, even though he had earlier fought against them in the 1870s, and lived in Podgorica beginning in approximately 1884. Prince Nicholas I of Montenegro recognized his status and employed him. He was one of the leaders of the Albanian Revolt of 1911, alongside chiefs such as Ded Gjo Luli, Mehmet Shpëndi, Mirash Luca and Luigj Gurakuqi. In 1912, the entire tribes of Gruda and Hoti, along with major portions of the Kastrati, Shkreli, and Kelmendi tribes, backed Montenegro during the Balkan Wars. In 1913, he was recognized as commander of Scutari by King Nicholas I of Montenegro.

== Life ==
=== Early life ===
Sokol Baci Ivezaj was the son of Bac, hence his most commonly used name is (Sokol Baci), and he belonged to the Precaj family of the Ivezaj brotherhood in Gruda. The Ivezaj brotherhood claimed they were descendants of Iveza, a son of a certain Vuksan Gela (also spelled Vuksan Gelja), who allegedly came from Suma, below Shkodër.

As a youth, Sokol was taken by the Ottoman authorities to be trained and raised in Istanbul. Due to his intelligence and athletic abilities, Sokol was selected to attend the military academy at the University of Sorbonne in Paris, France. As a result of the many battles he fought for the Ottomans, he was eventually selected, along with five other young men of high standing, for the personal bodyguard of the Sultan.

In 1877, during the Serbo-Turkish and Russo-Turkish wars, while on leave at home, the order came for the disarming of the northern Albanian tribes (the "Malissori"). The Gruda refused to obey, and refusing to be a traitor to his people, he led his clan in battle against Ottoman forces. He managed to behead two high-ranked Ottoman officers, however, the clan was defeated, and he was forced to flee. He became a fugitive and outlaw, in exile in Montenegro, against whom he had earlier fought against in the 1870s. He took refuge with his wife's tribe in Zatrijebač, which was annexed by the Principality of Montenegro after the Montenegrin–Ottoman War. Baci became a Montenegrin agent among the Catholic Albanians. He had entered cooperation through vojvoda Mašo Vrbica, the Interior Minister. Baci informed Vrbica over Albanian political commitment and movement of Ottoman forces in Malesia. A document dated 21 September 1879 from the French consulate in Shkodër shows that Sokol Baci and other chiefs of the Hoti and Gruda submitted a memorandum to the Great Powers requesting that their land not be ceded to Montenegro.

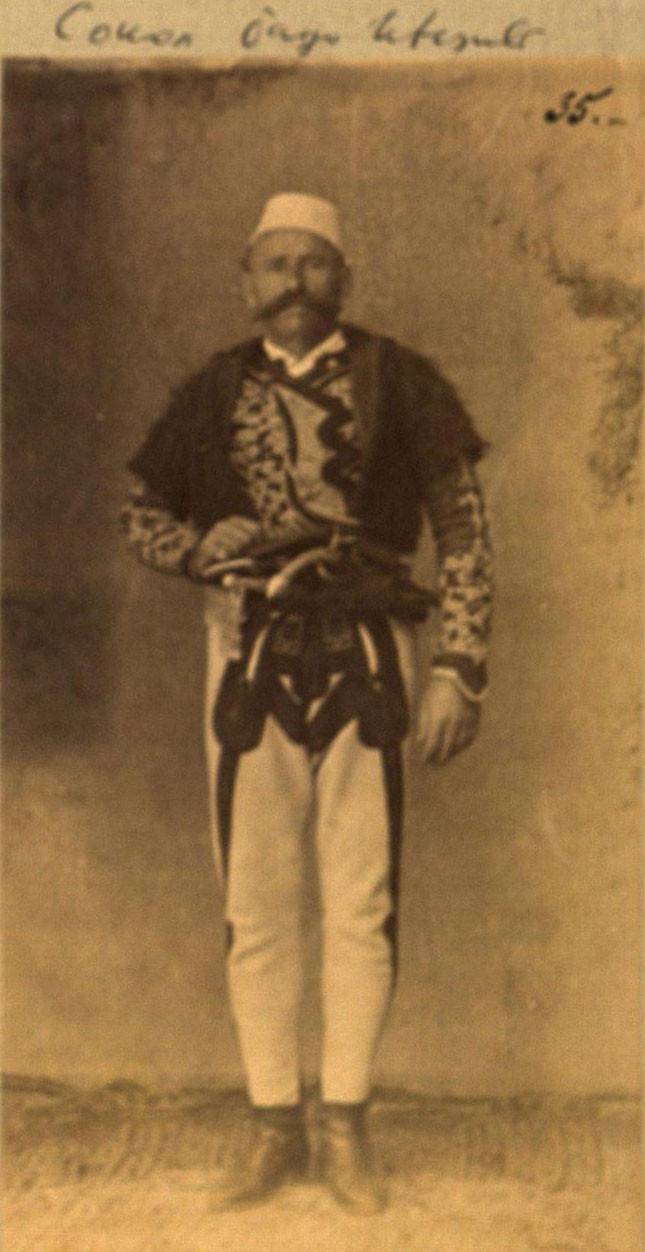
Sokol Baci in his middle years.

Prince Nicholas of Montenegro recognized him, gave him a house and land, and employed him in the Montenegrin government for northern Albanian affairs. After 1883, Prince Nicholas' diplomacy with the Malissori mainly went through Sokol Baci. A Montenegrin document, dated November 1891, with a list of Herzegovinian and Albanian leaders, showed that Sokol Baci received the largest payment from the Montenegrin government: 540 florins and 967 measures of flour annually for his service. In mid-July 1902, Sokol Baci gave a list to Prince Nicholas of Malissori chieftains and their escorts, who were given 1,190 florins on the Prince's order. Sokol Baci financed the building of a Catholic church in Podgorica in 1904 (that was destroyed in a May 1944 bombing). Sokol Baci returned briefly to Gruda upon the Young Turk regime's accession to the Ottoman government in 1908, but problems arose and he returned to Podgorica.

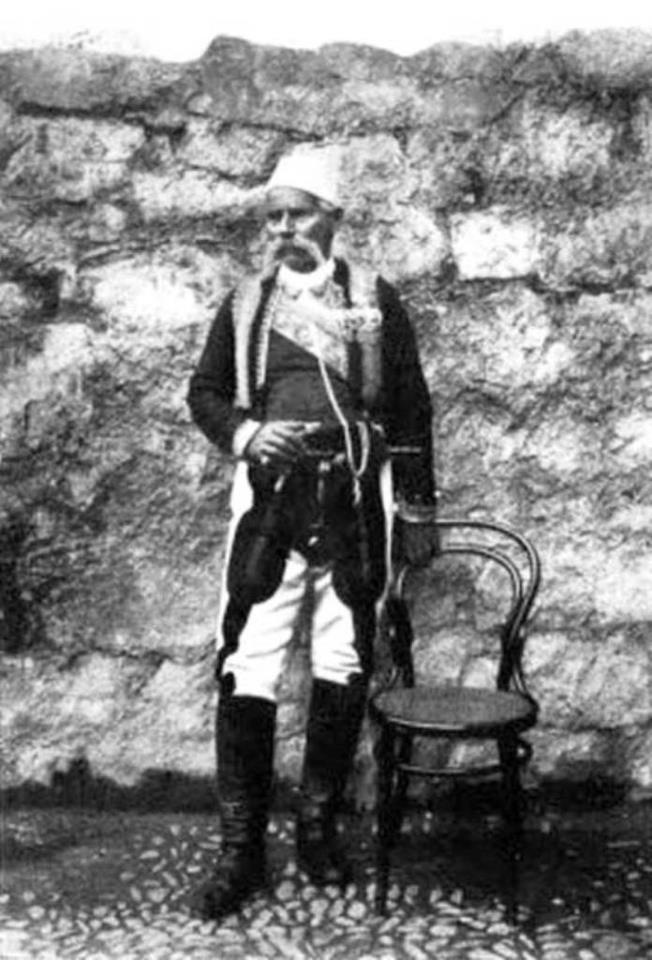
Sokol Baci (1902)

== 1911–13 ==
Among the leaders of the Albanian Revolt of 1911, who had turned their weapons and clans on the Ottomans, was "... the intelligent Sokol Baci" (from Gruda). Other leaders included: Mirash Luca (from Kastrati); Ded Gjo Luli (from Hoti); Ton Nika (from Shkreli); Mehmet Shpendi (from Shala); Luc Mark Gjeloshi from Selca, [Mirash Pali] and [Fran Pali] (from Nikci) and also intellectual Luigj Gurakuqi, among others. A previously classified intelligence document from the British Foreign Affairs indicates that Sokol Baci along with Ded Gjo Luli and Mirash Luca were the principal instigators of the Albanian Revolt of 1911. It describes Sokol Baci as "a man of some culture and very considerable intelligence". During the Albanian Revolt of 1911 "he organized with considerable skill the service of supplies to the insurgents". To Sokol, much respected by the tribesmen, Nikola entrusted the task of inducing the Albanian Catholics to migrate in numbers into Montenegro, promising them that if they would revolt against the Turks their wives and children should have shelter and protection till their land was freed from the Turks, and that they should receive sufficient arms and ammunition. Nikola himself promised independence to the tribesmen.

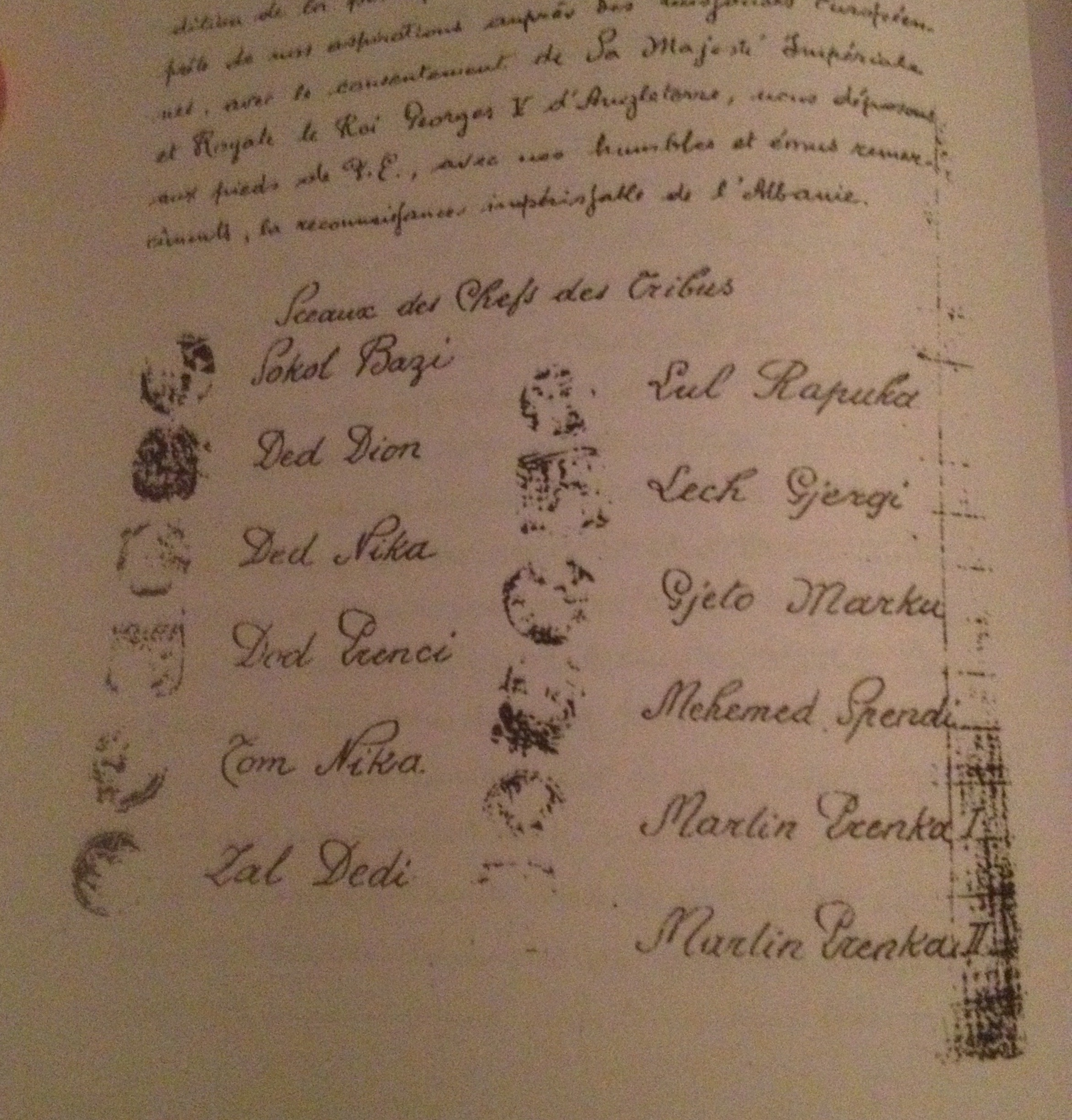
Copy of the Grece Memorandum (1911) with Sokol Baci as the lead signatory

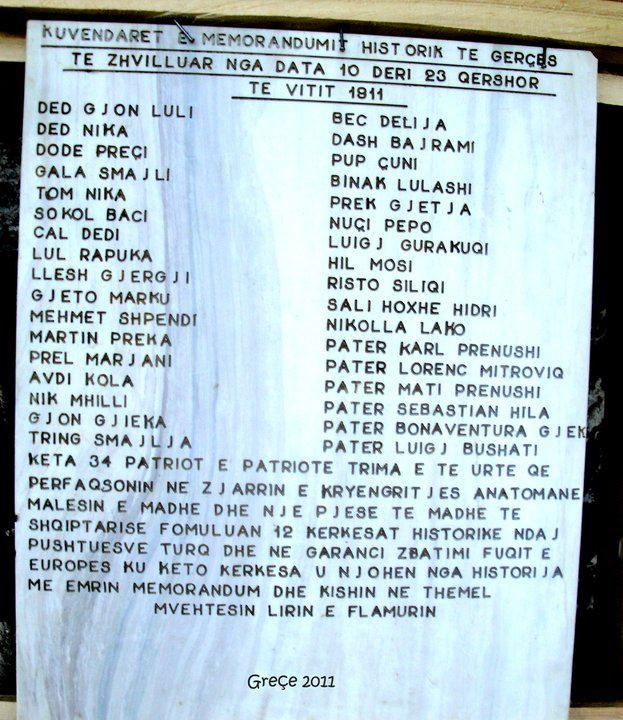
Memorial plaque of the Gërçe Memorandum, in Gërçe, Albania

An interview with Sokol Baci conducted by the Italian Newspaper Corrlere d'Italia, was published in numerous publications in May 1911 including the Los Angeles Herald and the Evening star of Washington DC. Images of the article were provided by the Library of Congress.

"Albanian Revolution is Directed by Exiled Chief" " Rome, May 7. - "The clerical "Corrlere d'Italla," which is especially well informed about all matters connected with Albania, publishes an Important Interview with the Albanian chief, Sokol Beg Batcho, who has been for several years an exile in Montenegro, where he is now living and from where he is directing the Albanian insurrection. This fine old warrior, who is a familiar figure at Cettinje, formulates the demands of the Albanians as follows: The administrative autonomy of our vilayets which contain an Albanian population under an Albanian or European governor general; European control for a number of years, until the new autonomous province has been placed upon a definite footing; the use of the Albanian language, with Latin characters in all official documents; the expenditure of all sums raised as taxes from the Albanians within Albania itself, and the restriction of military service to the Albanian districts only, so that no Arnaut may be sent to do his term of soldiering in the Yemen, as is now the case."

On June 24, 1911, the Ottoman minister to Montenegro, Saddridin Bey, came to negotiate with the Malissori, and promised an extension of the armistice and an increase of compensation money; Sokol Baci, however, urged the Malissori to not surrender, saying, "Where is the European guarantee?". In 1912, the tribes of Gruda and Hoti were allied with Montenegro, while support also came from the greater parts of the Kastrati and Shkreli tribes, as well as a part of the Kelmendi tribe.

According to Edith Durham, in 1912 Montenegro worked hard to rise the Malissori in exchange for arms and freedom, and they believed Montenegro's claimed intent to 'liberate their brethren'. During her war correspondence in the winter of 1913, Durham details her conversation with Sokol Baci and his son, Kole Sokoli, who stated that they were fighting to free Albania from the Ottomans. After the Montenegrin conquest of Scutari (1913), Nicholas I appointed Sokol Baci the commander (vojvoda) and brigadier of Scutari. When congratulated on his appointment, Sokol replied, "He who does not see through the screen, may his eyes fall out!" On May 26, 1913, 130 leaders of the Gruda, Hoti, Kelmendi, Kastrati and Shkreli sent a petition to Cecil Burney in Shkodër against the incorporation of their territories into Montenegro. Sokol broke ties with Nicholas I and lived in Shkodër for the remainder of his life. On November 14, 1918, Luigj Gurakuqi, Anton Harapi and Gjergj Fishta led the leaders of the Hoti and Gruda on a march from Montenegro to Shkodër, where they submitted a memorandum to the French Colonel, Bardy de Fourton. The memorandum was addressed to the Ministers of Foreign Affairs in Washington, London, Paris and Rome requesting that Hoti and Gruda be united with Albania, signed by the chiefs of Gruda, including Sokol's closest cousins, Dede Nika Ivezaj, Zef Martini Ivezaj, Mirash Hasi Ivezaj and Marash Pllumi Ivezaj.

== Legacy ==
English traveller and Albanophile, Edith Durham, was on very close terms with Sokol Baci. In her book The Struggle for Scutari, she explained:

Sokol Baci, for whom, though he is now blamed alike by Montenegrin and Albanian, I have both esteem and respect. He acted as best he knew, according to his dim lights, and believed that he was acting for the good of his country. A burly figure, in full Albanian dress, and with great white mustachios like walrus tusks. Chief of the Gruda tribe, in his young days he was one of Abdul Hamid's famous Albanian guard, but he left it owing to the way the Turks maltreated his country, and fell, therefore, upon evil times. After the war of 1876-77 he sided with the party which wished for free Albania, and in consequence was forced to flee for his life. Hunted like wild beasts, he and his wife took refuge with his wife's tribe, Triepshi, which was then annexed by Montenegro as part of the spoils of war, searched for by both Montenegrins and Turks. Finally, King Nikola, recognizing his value as an influential chieftain, gave him a house and land and employed him largely for Albanian affairs. Sokol served him with doglike fidelity and touching faith, but never forgot his ancestral home across the border. When the Young Turk regime started, he hoped to return to it, but a short visit showed him that was impossible, and he returned to Podgoritza, to play an important part in the drama of the next few years. Poor Sokol! he was used as a cat's-paw. But I believe that he acted in perfect good faith."

== Annotations ==
1. His full name which he gave to captain Lazović was: Sokol Bac Precaj Ivezić Vuksanović (Vuksangeljović) Gruda. Another source wrote his name as Sokol Rac Grcaj Vezirić Vuksangeljović. Other spellings of his short name include Sokol Baca (Сокол Баца), Sokol Baco, Sokol Batzi, etc. In Austrian documents, he is known as Nikola Bacci. The word sokol means "falcon" in Serbian languages.

== See also ==
- Tringe Smajl Martini
