= Mehmet Shpendi =

Hero of Albania

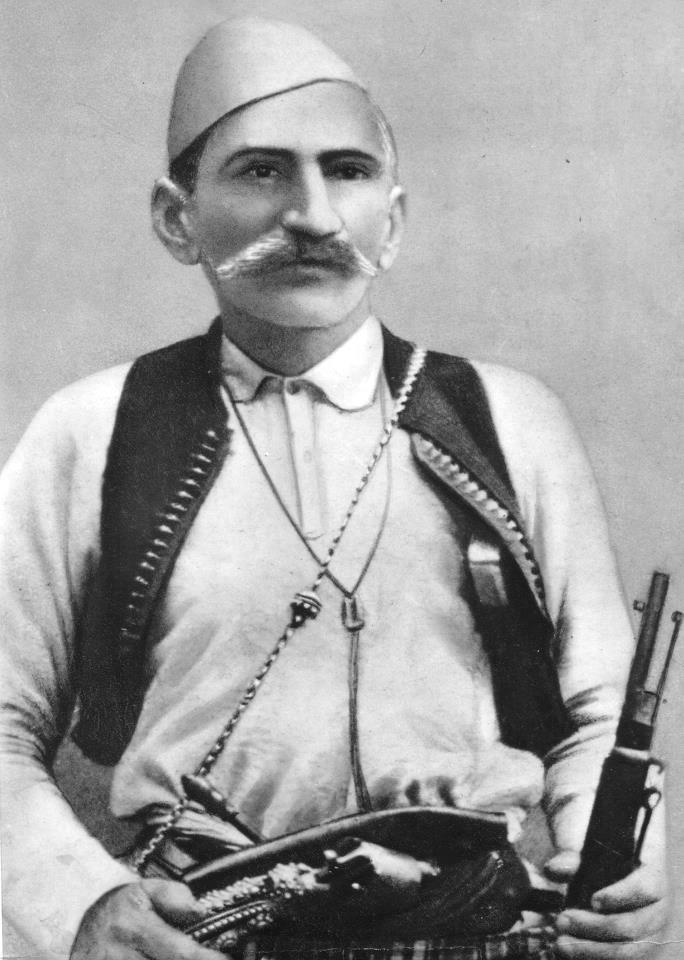
- Born: c. 1851; Pecaj, Shalë, Scutari Vilayet, Ottoman Empire (modern day Albania)
- Died: 25 July 1915; Albania
- Cause of death: Murdered by Radomir Vešović
- Military career
- Allegiance: League of Prizren
- Rank: Commander
- Nickname: The Raven
- Commands: Djelmnia e Shalës
- Conflicts: Albanian Revolt of 1910: Battle of Agri Pass; Albanian Revolt of 1911: Battle of Deçiq; Albanian Revolt of 1912

Mehmet Shpendi, also known as Sokol Shpendi (c. 1851–1915), a nationalist figure and guerrilla fighter, was one of the leading commanders of the Albanian Revolt of 1910, 1911, 1912 against the Ottoman Empire and struggle for liberty against Kingdom of Montenegro in 1915.

== Early life ==
Shpendi was born in the village of Shala Pecaj, Dukagjini, to a family of the Shala tribe.

== Political and military activity ==
In 1883, in Çezmë in Koplik, Shpendi, in the name of Dukagjin, sided with Ded Gjo Luli in order to resist the commission of Xhibalit which was formed in 1856 with the purpose of tricking the Montenegrins. In 1890 Mehmet Shpendi founded the "Shala Djelmnia", an Albanian patriotic organization. In 1910 the forces of Mehmet Shpendi fought the Ottoman general Shevket Turgut Pasha, where 300 Albanian highlanders were involved in the Battle of Agri Pass against the Ottomans. The Ottoman battalions numbered 20 and were supplied with artillery cannons and modern weapons. The Ottomans were frightened by the fierce fighting of the Highlanders and they lost the battle. Shpendi later gathered his Shalë forces, joined the Highlanders of the Hoti tribe with their chieftain Ded Gjo Luli and both refused to pay Ottoman taxes and to give up their weapons. Ottoman forces pursued them and the Highlanders entered Montenegro. In 1911, Ded Gjo Luli and Mehmet Shpendi rose the flag Albanian flag for the first time in 400 years in the victorious battle of Decic. He is regarded as a local hero.

On 28 May 1911, the Highlander tribes organized a meeting at the Bridge of Shala where they decided that all of Dukagjin were to participate in an armed insurrection. The Ottoman government announced for an amnesty for the freedom fighters, seeing the risk of the spreading insurgency. The Foreign minister of the Ottomans sought to meet the leaders of the Highlanders. Ded Gjo Luli and Mehmet Shpendi is said to have told the minister that "We have nothing to speak of. We will speak with you through our barrels." After the defeat of the Ottomans, Shpendi continued to fight the Montenegrin invaders.

== Death ==
On 15 July 1915, the Montenegrin general Radomir Vešović invited Mehmet Shpendi to a peace meeting but deceived and murdered him instead.

== See also ==
- Shala tribe

== Sources ==
http://www.kosovarimedia.com/index.php/biblioteka/atdhetar-te-shquar/36420-mehmet-shpendi-apo-shaljani-i-tetë.html "Mehmet Shpendi and the Eight Shala Tribes"
