= Tringe Smajli =

Albanian guerilla fighter

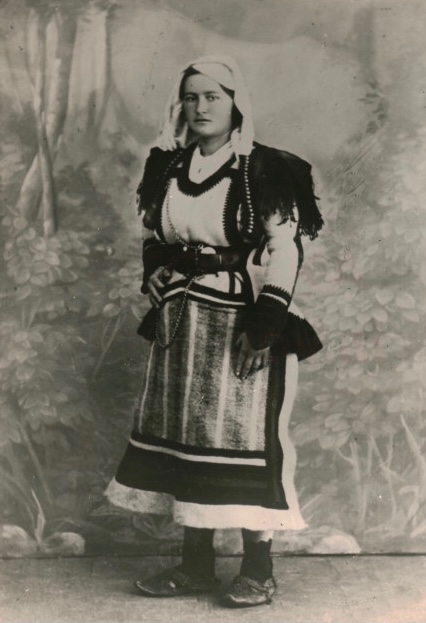
- Photo of Tringe Smajli
- Born: 1880; Hoti, Sanjak of Scutari, Ottoman Empire, (now in Montenegro)
- Died: 2 November 1917 (aged 36–37); Hoti, Kingdom of Montenegro
- Known for: Fighting Ottoman occupiers

Tringë Smajl Martini Ivezaj (1870 – 2 November 1917), known simply as Tringe Smajli, and as Yanitza outside Albania, was an Albanian guerrilla fighter who fought against the Ottoman Empire in the Malësia region. She was the daughter of Smajl Martini, a Catholic clan leader of the Grudë tribe of Malësia.

== Family ==
She was born in 1880. Her father Smajl Martini was an Albanian clan leader of the Grudë tribe (located in southeastern Montenegro). Her signature shows up in the protest-petitions of northern Albanian tribes sent to European ambassadors and counsels accredited in the Ottoman Empire, i.e. the one of May 9, 1878 sent to French Ambassador in Istanbul, or the one of June 15, 1878. The petitions expressed the dismay and disapproval of the Albanian tribes to the decisions of the Treaty of San Stefano and Congress of Berlin, which had granted much of the Scutari Vilayet to the Principality of Montenegro. He became very active during the League of Prizren, joining the rebels until the organization's end; he was later arrested in 1886, and imprisoned in Anatolia, from where he never returned. In addition, Smajl's two sons, Gjon and Zef, Tringe's brothers, also joined the League and were killed in battle in 1883.

== Biography ==
At the time of her brothers' deaths, Tringe sworn that she would stay at her family home and that she would never get married or leave the house. She kept living and acting as a woman, and she kept wearing the Albanian traditional women costume, as seen on all of her pictures.

Tringe joined the rebels and distinguished herself in the Battle of Deçiq. She participated in the Gërçe Memorandum, on June 23, 1911. Her rebel activity continued after the Albanian Declaration of Independence (28 November 1912).

She never married and never had children, as she had earlier taken the vow. She died on November 2, 1917, and was buried at the family burial grounds in the Gruda mountains within the village of Kshevë, in today's Montenegro. Two years later, the Montenegrin army (part of the Kingdom of Serbs, Croats and Slovenes) destroyed her grave while raiding the area.

== Legacy ==
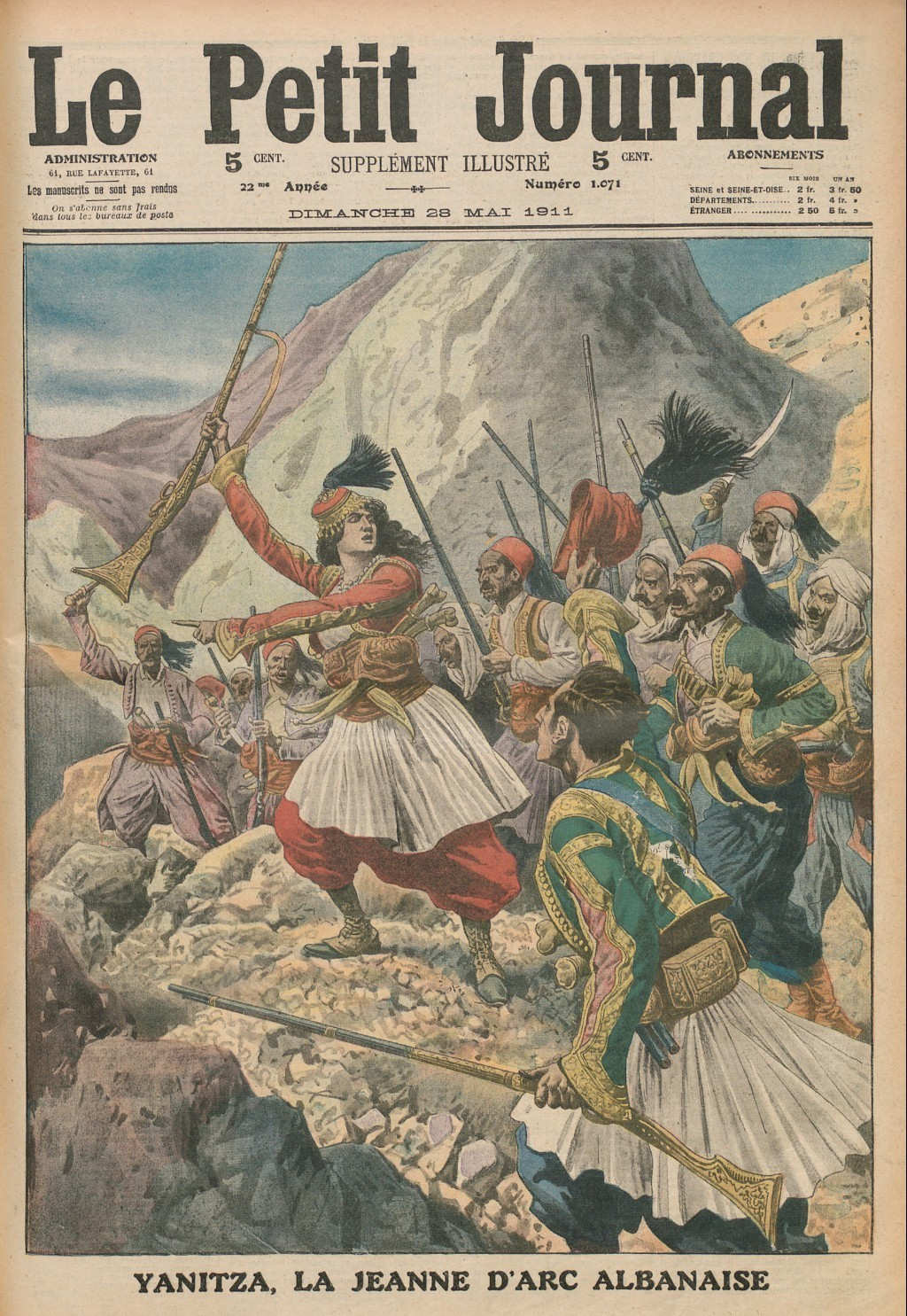
Yanitza, Albanian Joan of Arc - Illustration of 1911

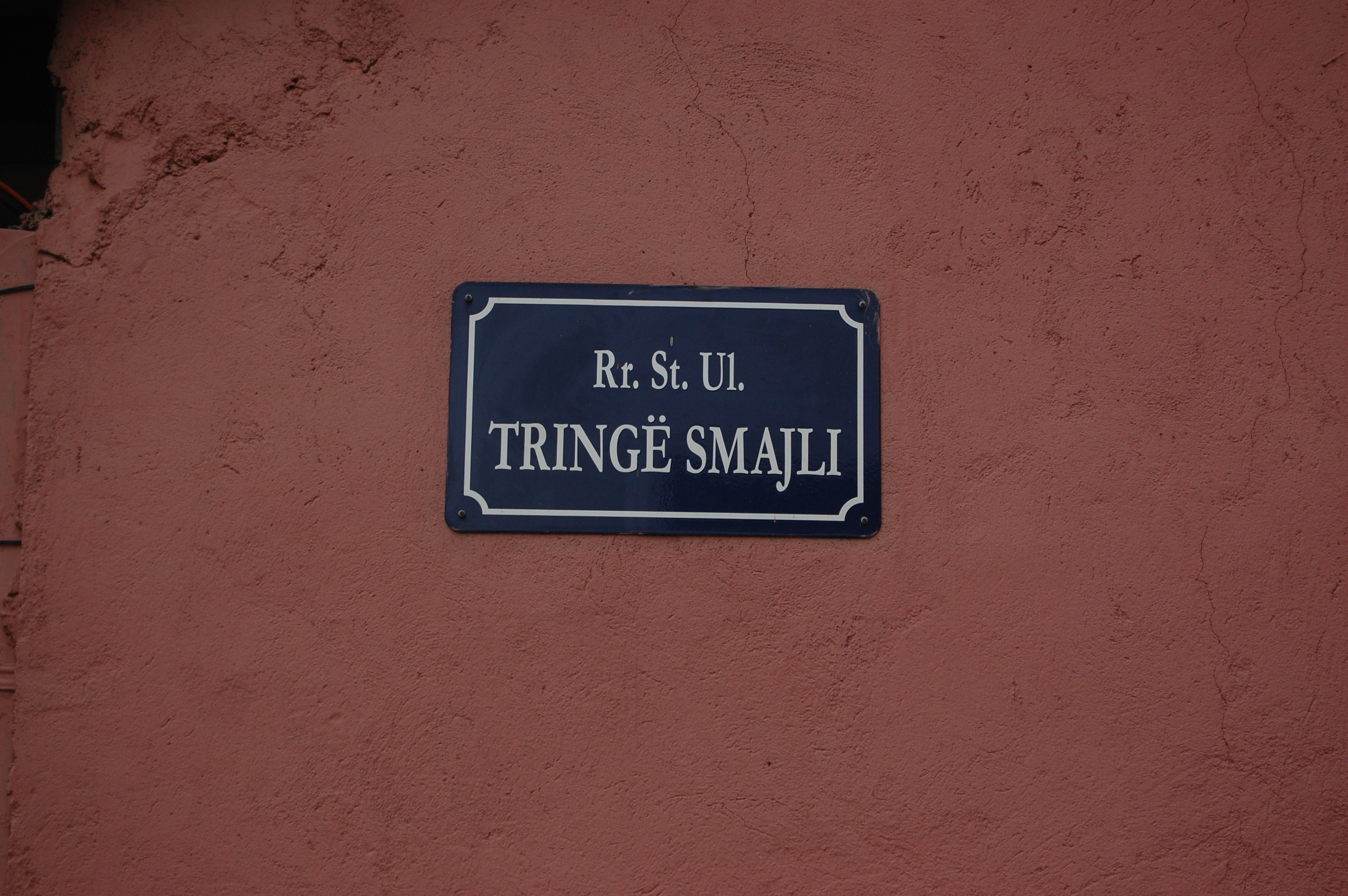
Street name plate in Pristina, Kosovo

Her heroism made her famous and was recorded in epic songs of Montenegrins and Albanians. The folkloric version of her heroism tells a slightly different chain of events: Smajl Martini, the clan leader was kidnapped in 1911 in Vranje by the Ottomans, and his body was never recovered, forcing Tringe to occupy her father's place. Since the Malissori uprising of 1911 was backed up by King Nikola Petrović, the epic song excluded the real story of her father death, hiding any reminiscence of the League of Prizren period, which would bring back territorial disputes between Albanians and the Kingdom of Montenegro. Ironically, the conflict between Albanians and Montenegro would be repeated shortly after. In 1911, the New York Times described Tringe Smajli as the "Albanian Joan of Arc", based on the Montenegrin version of the story which was heard somewhere in Podgorica by the Times correspondent. It describes Tringe as "a beautiful young woman" in addition to her heroism. Her legend lives on throughout the Balkans as one of the most heroic women warriors in the history of the region.

Several streets in Kosovo and Albania are named after her and she is regarded a People's Hero of Albania.

== See also ==
- Albanian Revolt of 1911
- Sokol Baci

== Bibliography ==
- Martini, Luigj, 2005 Prek Cali, Kelmendi Dhe Kelmendasit ISBN 9994334077 Publisher: Camaj-Pipaj
- Uli, Prenk, 1969 Tringa of Gruda: biography of Tringe Smajli (Albanian: Tringa e Grudës : skicë jetëshkrimi e Tringë Smailes, 1870-1917) OCLC 24539756 Publisher: Shtëpia Botuese "Naim Frashëri", Tirana
