= Greçë Memorandum =

The Greçë Memorandum (Albanian: Memorandumi i Greçës) or the Red Book (Albanian: Libri i Kuq) was a memorandum with twelve requests for the establishment of an autonomous Albanian province within the Ottoman Empire. The Memorandum was jointly written by Ismail Kemal and Luigj Gurakuqi.

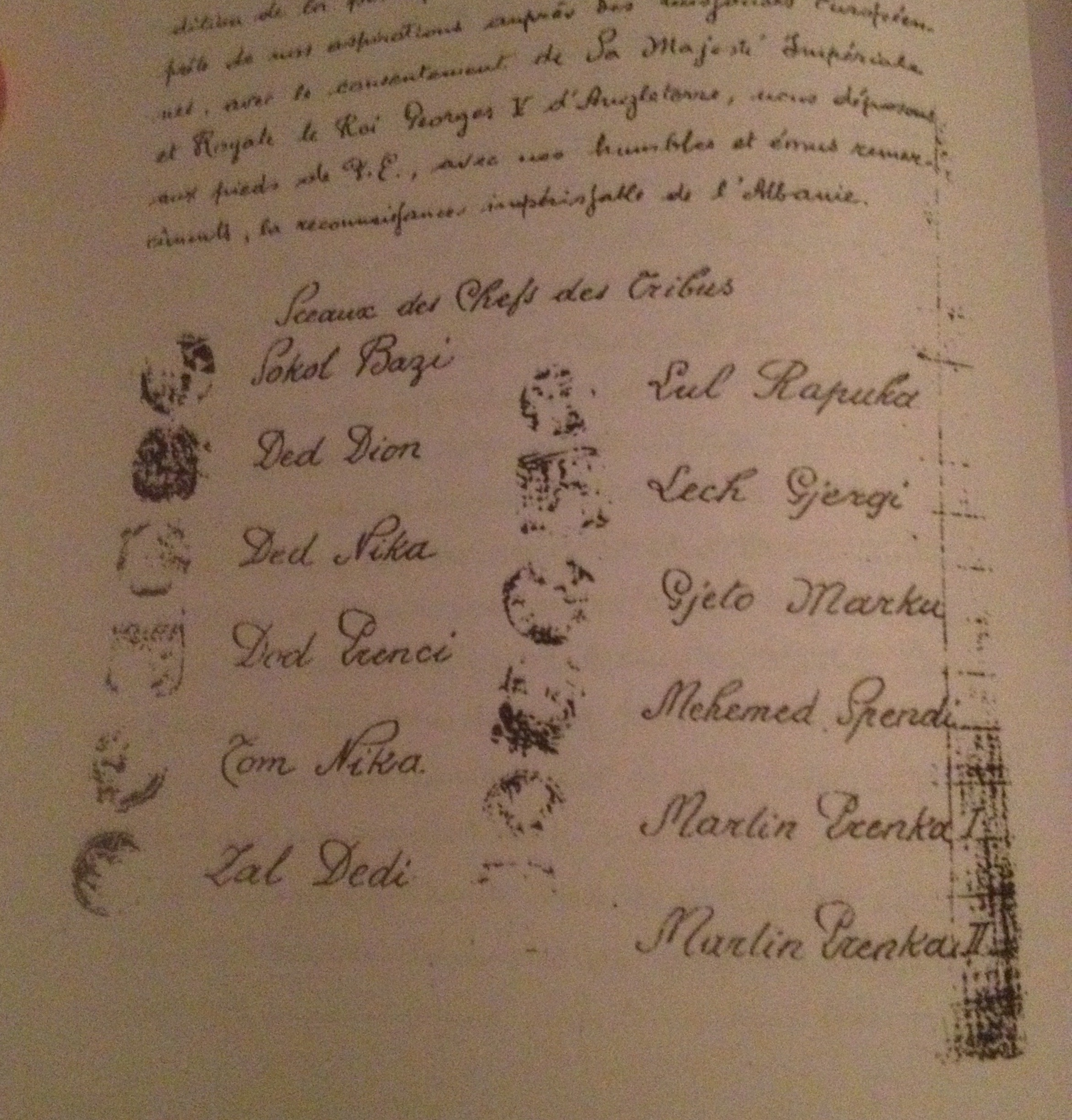
Copy of the Greçë Memorandum (1911)

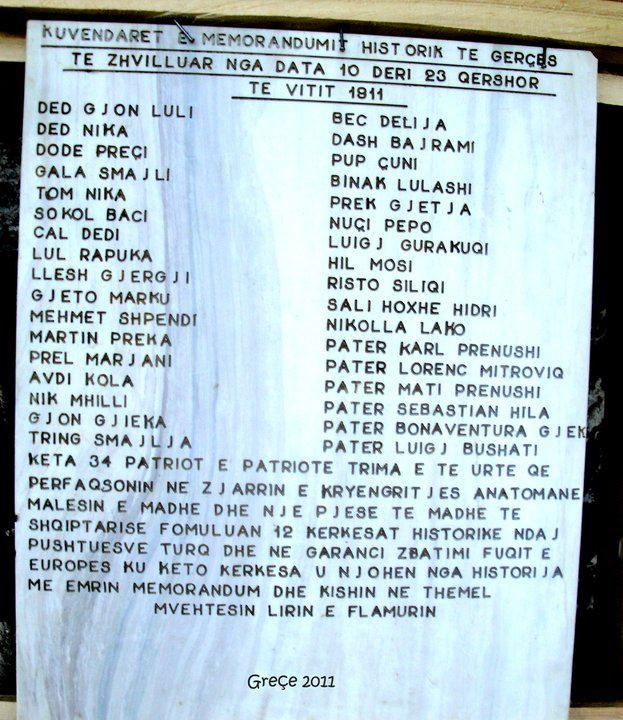
Memorial plaque of 2011 in Ahu i Greçës (Beech of Greça) near Selca

== Requests ==
The leaders of the Albanian Revolt of 1911 organized a meeting at the location of Greçë near Selcë village in Kelmend. Today, this location is a natural and cultural monument of Shkodër County listed as "Ahu i Gerçës". Ismail Kemal joined them and together they draw up the memorandum, sometimes referred to as the "Red Book" because of the color of its covers, which addressed their requests both to Ottoman Empire and Europe (in particular to the Great Britain). This memorandum was signed by 22 Albanian chieftains, four from each tribe of Hoti, Gruda and Shkreli, five from Kastrati, three from Kelmend and two from Shalë.

Requests in the memorandum included:

- General amnesty for all participants in the revolt
- Demand for recognition of the Albanian ethnicity
- Election of the deputies of Albanian ethnicity for the Ottoman Parliament according to the proportional system
- Albanian language in schools
- Governor and other appointed high officials have to know Albanian language and all other positions in the administration have to be reserved only for people of Albanian ethnicity
- Men who are ethnic Albanians to serve army only in Albania during peacetime
- Confiscated arms to be returned
- All Albanian property damaged by Ottoman troops to be compensated

The Memorandum was submitted to the representatives of Great Powers in Cetinje, Montenegro. It was drafted by Qemali as a reply to amnesty offered by Ottoman military commander Shefqet Turgut Pasha on 18 June.

== Afterwards ==
Although the Sublime Porte tried to minimize the effects of the Memorandum by treating it as a local initiative of the Malësia region, it gave the Albanian struggle for independence a strong boost. Leaders such as Namik Delvina, Muharrem Rushiti, Musa Demi, Spiro Bellkameni and Qamil Panariti and their chetas strengthened the pressure on the Ottoman authorities to accept requests of the Memorandum. In a July 17 meeting held in a monastery in Cepo, delegates from all kazas of Janina Vilayet declared that they will fully support the Greçë Memorandum. They sent a letter to the Sultan, there they appealed for the implementation of the Memorandum and the treatment of the Albanian people as a whole. This countered with the aim of the Sublime Porte to treat the Memorandum as a local issue of Malësia. After the letter was sent, the secret committee of Janina organized a number of new armed acts. They planned a culminating action on July 23, in the anniversary of the Young Turk Revolution but failed. Later, some other efforts failed, and the Memorandum of Greçë gradually lost its importance. The coming events and situation in 1912 enabled Albanians to better organize their efforts, and consequently to successfully declare the independence of Albania from the Ottoman Empire.

== See also ==
- Albanian Revolt of 1911
- Battle of Deçiq

== Sources ==
- Treadway, John D (1983), "The Malissori Uprising of 1911", The Falcon and Eagle: Montenegro and Austria-Hungary, 1908–1914, West Lafayette, Ind.: Purdue University Press, ISBN 978-0-911198-65-2, OCLC 9299144
- Gawrych, George Walter (2006), The crescent and the eagle: Ottoman rule, Islam and the Albanians, 1874–1913, London: I.B. Tauris, ISBN 1-84511-287-3
