= Koja e Kuçit =

Region in Malësia; historic Albanian tribe

Koja e Kuçit (lit. 'Koja of Kuçi', Montenegrin: Kučka krajina) is a historical Albanian tribe and region in Malësia. Koja is a Catholic region located between Triepshi and Kuči. The people of Koja are referred to as Kojanë or Koqas.

== History ==
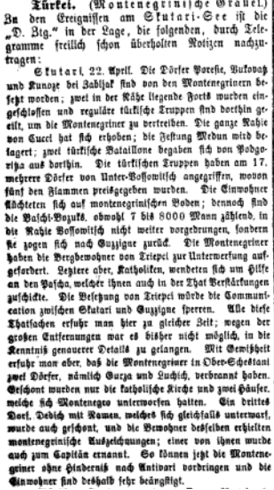
Newspiece of attack against Trieshi and Koja by Montenegro in the Austro-Hungarian newspaper Tagespost Graz, May 14 1862.

Koja is the smallest region in Malësia. It is attested for the first time in the Ottoman defter of 1582 where the villages of Koqa i Madh and Koqa i Vogël appear in the nahiyah of Kuçi. These settlements were not recorded in the previous registers suggesting that their founding can be attributed to an increase in population, possibly due to migrations, that occurred following the consolidation of Ottoman power in the region. In regards to their anthroponymy, over half of the inhabitants of these villages bore typical Albanian personal names, the remainder bearing mixed Albanian-Slavic anthroponyms. In the Montenegrin–Ottoman War (1861–62), Kuči, Piperi and other groups attacked Triepshi and Koja e Kuçit, but that attack was repulsed. Pretash Zeka Ulaj from Koja was one of the Malësor leaders that led the region to its freedom when fighting in 1911 in the Battle of Deçiq, alongside the famous Ded Gjo Luli from Hoti. Dokë Preci Krcaj, Cakë Uci Ivanaj, Gjeto Toma Kolçaj, Tomë Uci Ivanaj, Kolë Doka Marashaj, Marash Leca Gjokaj, and Gjeto Gjeka Ivanaj are remembered as the Seven Heroes of Koja for giving their lives in the battle.

== Brotherhoods and families ==
Koja e Kuçit became part of Montenegro in 1880. The surnames are given both in their original Albanian form and the Montenegrin equivalent that was required by the authorities that the people of Koja adopt in that era.

- Ulaj/Ulić (Bajraktar)
- Gjolaj/Đoljić
- Kolçaj/Kolčević
- Nucullaj/Nuculović
- Marashaj/Maraš
- Perkaj/Perković
- Ivanaj/Ivanović
- Lucaj/Ljucić
- Krcaj/Krcić
- Gjokaj/Đokić
- Gjeloshaj/Đeljošević
- Gorvokaj/Gorvokić
- Pali/Paljić

== Notable people ==
- Pretash Zeka Ulaj/Ulić —Leader of the tribe volunteers at the Battle of Deçiq.
- Gjeto Toma Kolçaj/Kolić — Participant at the Battle of Deçiq.
- Viktor Marku Ulaj/Ulić — International relations scholar and Political Advisory to former Kosovo Prime Minister Agim Çeku in 2006.
