= Shevket Turgut Pasha =

Ottoman army general

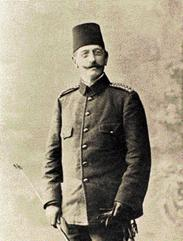
- Shevket Turgut Pasha (c. 1890)
- Born: 1857; Istanbul, Ottoman Empire
- Died: 1924 (aged 66–67); Istanbul, Turkey
- Citizenship: Ottoman; Turkish
- Occupation: Major General (mirliva)
- Known for: Albanian revolt of 1911; Battle of Deçiq

Shevket Turgut Pasha (Turkish: Şevket Turgut Paşa; 1857–1924) was an Ottoman Turkish army general with the rank of mirliva (major general), who also held the governmental title of pasha (sir). He went to the Prussian military school.

== Biography ==
=== Albanian revolt of 1910 ===
During the Albanian revolt of 1910, the Ottoman government replaced Djavid Pasha and sent Turgut along with 16,000 infantry, some cavalry and artillery to put down the revolt by Albanian rebels. Throughout his military campaign in Kosovo, Turgut imposed upon the population severe measures to disarm and control them. On 10 April Albanian deputies in the Ottoman Parliament expressed their concerns calling Turgut's actions a "barbarous advance", while a report referring to events in Albania was given to the Grand Vizier by some of the Albanian elite in Istanbul. In parliament the Ottoman government declined to give answers and stated that there was no need to send an investigating commission to Albania. As such Turgut was empowered and applied the "law on the bands" in Albania.

After the disarmament of Kosovo, Turgut continued toward Shkodër and during the journey he fought Catholic Albanian Malisors (highlanders), in particular a battle against the forces of Mehmet Shpendi and Isa Boletini, the bajraktar (chieftain) of the Shala tribe. On 26 July Turgut reached Shkodër, gave an order for the population to hand over weapons and called for a census to be conducted with military conscription of young males aged 18–26. Turgut's measures were disliked by local inhabitants and he remained in the town until 22 August. Apart from the north-western and northern mountains, Ottoman armies led by Turgut controlled northern Albania. On 22 August 1910, Turgut left Shkodër for Selanik (modern Thessaloniki) after completing the military goals of the campaign that lasted five months. On his way traveling through Mirdita Turgut gave an order for his soldiers to take Dibre (modern Debar) and disarm its inhabitants. Assisted through an imperial fetva (decree), Turgut in central and southern Albania closed Albanian schools and Albanian language education underwent a setback.

=== Albanian revolt of 1911 ===
The Albanian revolt of 1911 developed in April and Turgut along with 8,000 soldiers came back to the region to deal with the situation. At Shkodër on 11 May 1911, Turgut made an official announcement and declared martial law with an offer of amnesty to rebels if they quickly went back to their homes. A pardon was not offered to Malisor chieftains and as leaders of the uprising they would need to stand trial through a court martial (Divani Harb). From Podgorica the Albanian chieftains replied to Turgut on 18 May 1911. Signed by 60 chieftains the message said that in 1910 they disarmed due to Turgut's promises of constitutional rights and those commitments were not kept as the Ottoman government closed Albanian schools, raised taxes, imprisoned people and committed other heavy-handed measures. The chieftains also accused the Ottoman government of provoking communal conflict between Muslim and Christian Albanians and stated that their return to as loyal subjects rested upon the constitution being upheld.

Turgut announced an imperial decree that offered amnesty to inhabitants on 18 June 1911. The terms outlined that rebels come back within ten days to hand over their weapons and a personal gift of 10,000 liras would be granted by the sultan for compensation of damages. For destroyed or lost property of the Malisors the government would give restitution. Malisor chieftains and their families had taken refuge in Montenegro to avoid Turgut and were visited by Ismail Qemali. At a gathering of the Malisors and Qemali they wrote the Greçë Memorandum calling for Albanian autonomy, ethno-linguistic rights and other measures. Signed by the Albanian delegates the memorandum also referred to the destruction done by Turgut in northern Albania and the document was a reply to the general's amnesty decree. Sultan Mehmed V signed an amnesty decree on 3 July 1911 and the rebels refused to come back due to their dislike of Turgut. The rebels held Turgut personally responsible and not the Ottoman government for what occurred in Albania. The Ottoman government recalled Turgut to Istanbul. Albanians were pleased with Turgut's departure viewing it as a humiliation for the general that had been decorated for his military campaign against the Albanian rebellion by the sultan and foreign ambassadors. Turgut was replaced by Abdullah Pasha.

== See also ==
- Mahmud Shevket Pasha
