= Battle of Deçiq =

Battle of the Albanian Revolt of 1911

Coordinates: 42°20′42″N 19°18′21″E

- Part of Albanian Revolt of 1911
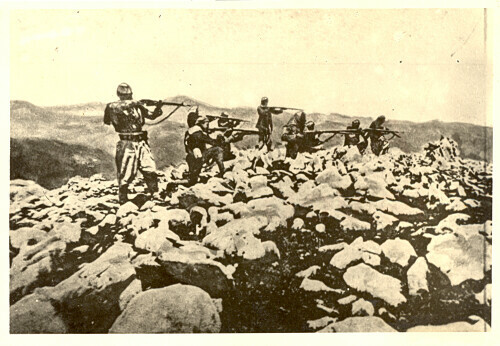
- Albanian fighters during the battle.
| Date | 6 April 1911 |
| Location | Deçiq near Tuzi, Ottoman Empire (now Montenegro) |
| Result | Albanian victory |

Belligerents
| Northern Albanian (Malësor) tribes | Ottoman Empire |

Commanders and leaders
| Ded Gjo Luli; Sokol Baci; Pretash Zeka Ulaj; Luc Mark Gjeloshi; Marash Pali; Gjin Pjetër Pervizi | (Ottoman Empire) Shevket Turgut Pasha |

Units involved
| Albanian Tribesmen | Ottoman Army |

Strength
| 3,000–3,300 | 28,000 |

The Battle of Deçiq (Albanian: Beteja e Deçiqit; Serbian: Bitka kod Dečića/ Битка код Дечића) was a battle between Albanian tribesmen and Ottoman forces during the Malësori uprising of 1911. It was a turning point for Albania's secession from the Ottoman Empire. Dedë Gjo Luli, the organiser of the Albanian tribal forces, raised the Albanian flag for the first time since 1479 on the mountain of Deçiq after the Albanians had achieved victory over the Ottoman Turks.

== Location and Background ==
The battle took place in Deçiq, south of the town of Tuzi (in modern-day Montenegro), within the Gruda tribal territory. Tuzi is the town center of the Malësia region in Montenegro, whereas the town center of Malësia E Madhe is Koplik. Malësia is simply translated to "The Highlands," referring to the rough mountainous terrain that characterizes the region. Inhabitants of Malësia are predominantly Roman Catholic, although the region also has a sizeable Muslim population (including Koplik itself). The tribesmen of Malësia are also known as Malësorët (singular: Malësor), meaning Highlanders.

The battle occurred during the Albanian Uprising of 1911, in which the Malësor tribes undertook multiple successful military campaigns against the Ottoman Empire. During the first days of April, there was fighting around Dinosh-Deçiq. Reports at the time indicated that this force consisted of around 2,500 Malësor Albanian tribesmen; of which 900 belonged to the Gruda, 600 to the Kelmendi, 400 to the Hoti, 250 to the Shala, a small number to the Shkreli tribe and unknown numbers from Kastrati, Triepshi and Koja e Kuçit. The Ottomans had initiated the offensive, burning Vuksan Lekaj and attacking Humi, Deçiq, Tuzi, etc. The Hoti tribesmen in Helm managed to hold off the Ottomans, killing 25 soldiers, wounding roughly the same amount, and capturing 20.

== The Battle ==
The main portion of the battle took place between Tuzi and Koplik (in modern-day Albania), whereby 3,000-3,300 Malësors fought against 28,000 Ottoman soldiers. Koplik is the largest town in Malësia and across the border with Montenegro is Tuzi. As the fighting proceeded, both armies decided to move north into Tuzi, where the battle ended.

The Ottomans had initially attacked Deçiq, which was protected by 600 Albanian tribesmen, with 6 battalions, 2 artillery units, and 9 machine guns. After 12 hours of battle and 300 casualties on the Ottoman side, the Turks retreated to the castle of Shipshanik.

On the 6th of April, Nikë Gjelosh Luli, Dedë Gjo Luli's brother, raised the Albanian flag on the summit of Bratila in Deçiq. During this offensive, the Ottomans lost around 30 soldiers, whereas the Albanian tribesmen lost 7, one of which was the flagbearer Nish Gjelosh Luli. When raising the flag, Ded Gjo Luli said "Now, brothers, you will see that which no one has seen in 450 years...". This was the first time Albanians raised their Flag since the Castle of Shkodër had fallen in 1479. About a year and a half later, the Albanian Flag was officially raised in the southern town of Vlora, Albania.

The Hoti and Gruda tribes continued their offensives in Dinosh on 7–8 April, resulting in the recapture of positions lost during the first days of April. On the 13th of April, the combined efforts of Kelmendi, Shala, and Shkreli tribesmen in coordination with Hoti, Gruda, and Kastrati tribesmen led to the successful conquest of strategic positions in Deçiq and close to Tuzi. An Austro-Hungarian military report at the time claimed that the Albanian tribesmen had attacked Tuzi and the hills to the east, which were called Mali i Hotit (Mountains of Hoti).

== Aftermath ==
In 1913, at the Treaty of London, the powers of Europe decided to grant approximately half of Malësia to Montenegro while the rest was ceded to Albania. Tuzi, along with half of the Hoti (Traboini) tribal territory, all of Gruda, Triesh, and Koja e Kuçit went to Montenegro. Kelmendi, the other half of Hoti (Rapsha), Kastrati, Shkreli, and the town of Koplik remained in Albania, but certain parts of Kelmendi, such as Vuthaj, Martinaj, Plav and Guci, went to Montenegro. Most of Kosovo was annexed to Serbia, with parts of the region of Metohija being ceded to Montenegro.

== Notable warriors ==
- Ded Gjo Luli Dedvukaj of Traboin
- Lulash Zeke Nicaj of Traboin
- Sokol Baci of Gruda
- Palok Marku Lulgjuraj of Gruda
- Zef miliqi Lulgjuraj of Selishti
- Prel Marku Lulgjuraj of Lofka
- Pretash Zeka Ulaj of Koja
- Prek Cali of Kelmend
- Dod Preçi of Kastrati
- Dok Prëçi Krcaj of Koja
- Gjeto Toma Kolçaj of Koja
- Mehmet Shpendi of Shala
- Tringe Smajl Martini of Gruda
- Palok Traboini 1888–1951, Secretary of Ded Gjo Lul, teacher, and owner of the Albanian Flag of Deçiq, which he brought from Vienna through Dalmatia.
- Gjin Pjetër Pervizi of Skuraj,Kurbin
