= Malissori uprising =

Albanian revolt in the Ottoman Empire

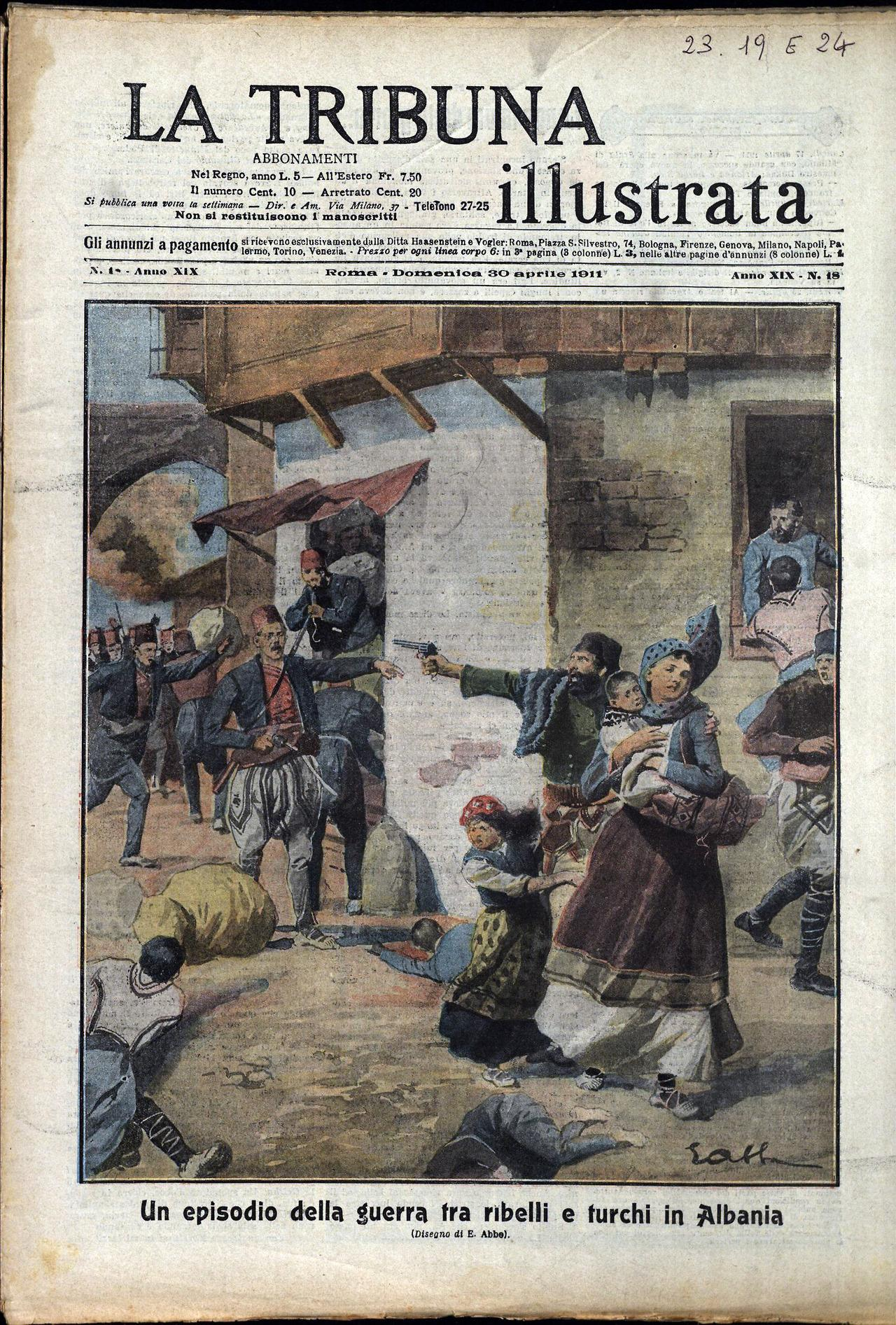
- Depiction of the revolt by The Illustrated Tribute (April, 1911)
Date	24 March 1911 – 4 August 1911
Location	Malesia, Scutari Vilayet, Ottoman Empire (modern-day eastern Montenegro and northern Albania)
Result	Ottoman victory

Belligerents
Ottoman Empire	Albanian tribes Support: Kingdom of Montenegro

Commanders and leaders
Shevket Turgut Pasha; Enver Pasha	Ded Gjo Luli; Sokol Baci; Mehmet Shpendi; Prek Cali; Isa Boletini; Bajram Curri Gjin Pjetër Pervizi

Strength
~28,000 (at Battle of Deçiq)	3,000–3,300

Casualties and losses
Unknown; 12 captured	Unknown

The Malissori uprising (or the Albanian revolt of 1911) was one of many Albanian revolts in the Ottoman Empire and lasted from 24 March 1911 until 4 August 1911 in the region of Malessia (also spelled Malissori).

== Background ==
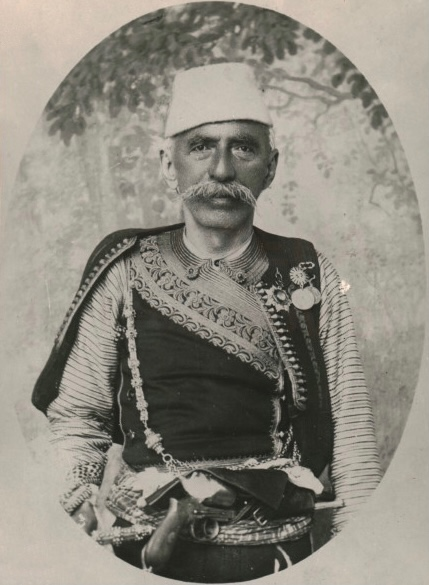
Ded Gjo Luli was one of the leaders of the revolt

The main headquarters of the rebels were in Podgorica and King Nikola provided weapons for the insurgents. King Nicholas promised to support Malësor with arms and to provide a shelter to their families before the revolt began.

Although both king Nikola and prince Danilo were assuring Ottoman ambassador that they are observing "the strictest neutrality" it was obvious that Kingdom of Montenegro was involved in this revolt. General Vukotić organized passing out the weapon to the rebels.

Nikola's strategy was to stimulate unrest in northern Albania and north-western Kosovo to the point where he could intervene and annex more territory for Montenegro. Most of contemporary studies confirm that this uprising was supported by Montenegro.

At the end of March 1911 the Kingdom of Montenegro forced them to return to Kosovo Vilayet. Thousands of refugees together with the Albanian Catholic tribes staged the Albanian Revolt of 1911.

The Albanian National Committee was founded in Podgorica in February 1911. In a meeting of the Committee held in Podgorica from 2 to 4 February 1911, under the leadership of Nikolla bey Ivanaj and Sokol Baci Ivezaj, it was decided to organize an Albanian uprising.

== Revolt in Malesia ==
=== Revolt ===
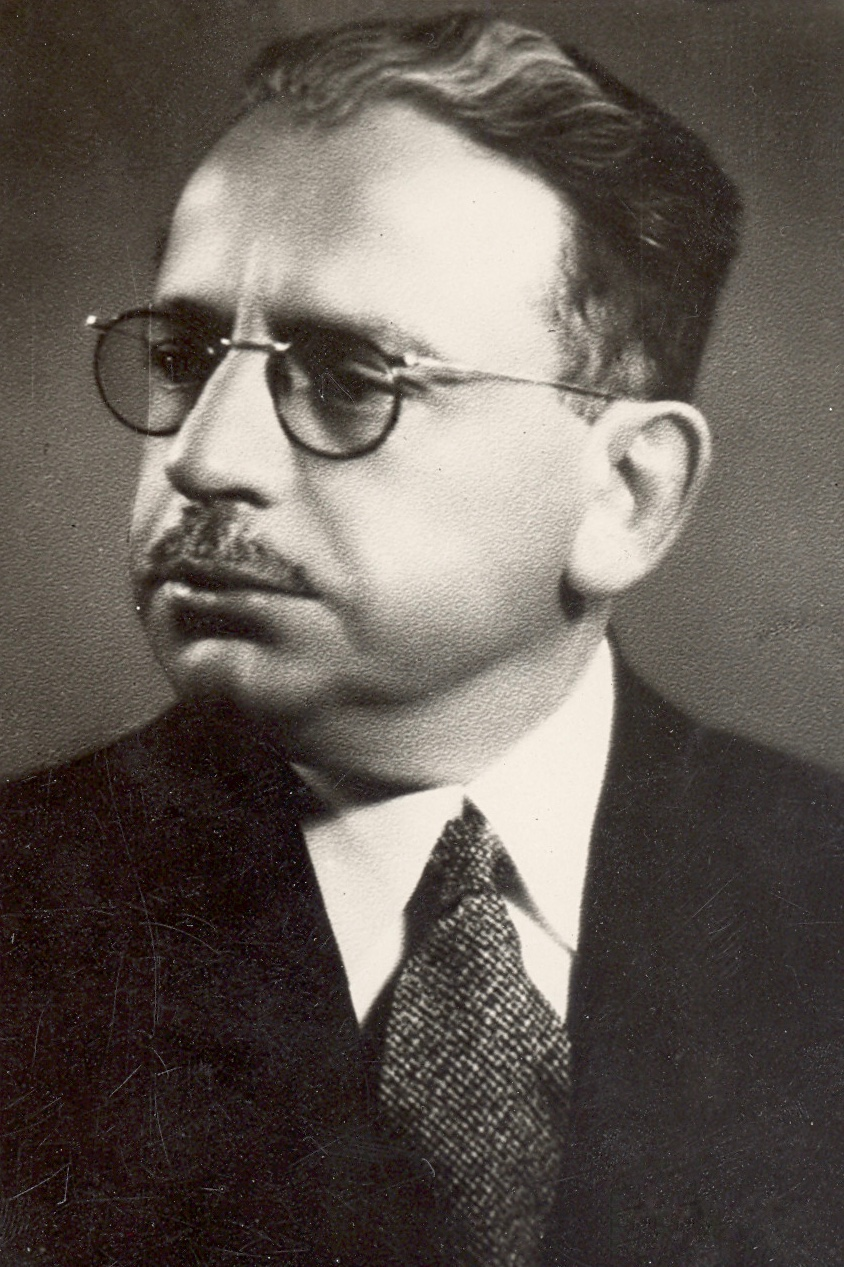
Terenzio Tocci proclaimed independence of Albania on 26 April 1911

Troops of Montenegro supported the revolt and captured 12 Ottoman soldiers and imprisoned them in Podgorica.

The first serious attempt of the Ottoman government to suppress the revolt resulted with the Battle of Deçiq. Terenzio Tocci gathered the Mirdite chieftains on 26 April 1911 in Orosh, proclaimed the independence of Albania, raised the flag of Albania (according to Robert Elsie it was raised for the first time after Skanderbeg's death) and established the provisional government. Shefqet Turgut Pasha wanted to meet this threat and returned to the region with 8.000 soldiers. As soon as he reached Shkodër on 11 May, he issued a general proclamation which declared martial law and offered an amnesty for all rebels (except for Malisor chieftains) if they immediately return to their homes. After Ottoman troops entered the area Tocci fled the empire abandoning his activities.

On 14 May, three days after his proclamation, Shefqet Turgut Pasha ordered his troops to seize Dečić, hill that overlooked Tuzi. Sixty Albanian chieftains rejected Turgut Pasha's proclamation on their meeting in Podgorica on 18 May. After almost a month of intense fightings rebels were trapped and their only choices were either to die fighting, to surrender or to flee to Montenegro. Most of the rebels chose to flee to Montenegro which became a base for large number of rebels determined to attack the Ottoman Empire. Ismail Kemal Bey and Tiranli Cemal bey traveled from Italy to Montenegro at the end of May and met the rebels to convince them to adopt the nationalistic agenda which they eventually did. On 12 June Porte prematurely proclaimed that the revolt had ended.

==== Gerče Memorandum ====
At initiative Ismail Qemali the assembly of the tribal leaders of the revolt was held in a village in Montenegro (Gerče) on 23 June 1911 to adopt the "Gërçe Memorandum" (sometimes referred to as "Red Book"(Libri i Kuq) because of the color of its covers) with their requests both to Ottoman Empire and Europe (in particular to the Great Britain). This memorandum was signed by 22 Albanian chieftains, four from each tribe of Hoti, Grude and Skrel, five from Kastrati, three from Klementi and two from Shale.

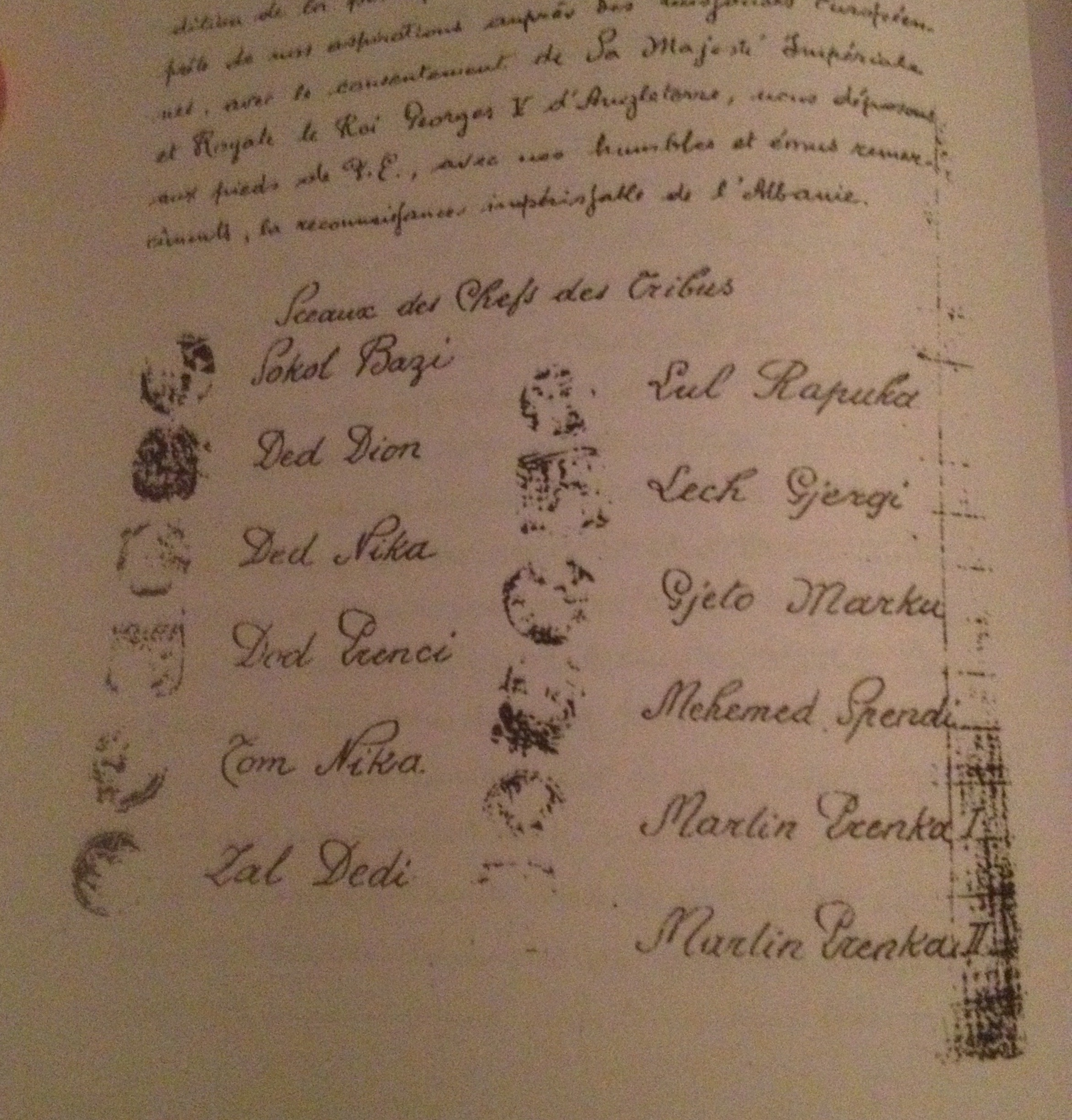
Copy of the Gërçe Memorandum (1911)

Requests of memorandum included:

1. general amnesty for all participants in the revolt
2. demand for recognition of the Albanian ethnicity
3. election of the deputies of Albanian ethnicity for the Ottoman Parliament according to the proportional system
4. Albanian language in schools
5. governor and other appointed high officials have to know Albanian language and all other positions in the administration have to be reserved only for people of Albanian ethnicity
6. men who are ethnic Albanians to serve army only in Albania during the peacetime
7. confiscated arms to be returned
8. all Albanian property damaged by Ottoman troops to be compensated

The Memorandum was submitted to the representatives of Great Powers in Cetinje, Montenegro. It was basically a reply to amnesty offered by Ottoman military commander Shefqet Turgut Pasha.

=== Activities of the Great Powers ===
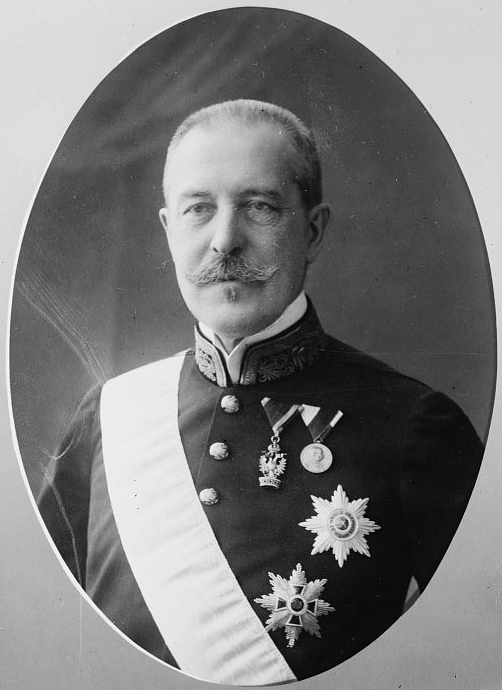
von Aehrenthal sent the warning note to the Porte

At the end of May 1911 Russia protested against military moves of Ottoman army near the border of Montenegro and sent a note to the Ottoman foreign minister. Russian Empire was very willing to participate in efforts to resolve the crisis because it was afraid that Austria-Hungary might increase its influence in Montenegro and use the crisis to invade and annex Albania. Serbia and Italy also believed that Austria-Hungary was responsible for the revolt in Albania and suspected that Austria had plans to intervene in Albania. The British ambassador in Vienna rejected the possibility that Austria-Hungary caused the revolt.

On 8 June, von Aehrenthal, the foreign minister of Austria-Hungary, issued a semi-official note to the Ottoman Empire and informed the Porte that Ottoman repression of the Catholic tribes will not be ignored and in case it is continued Austria-Hungary will take an action. Austrian intervention to support the rebels was urged by Catholic journals in Vienna as well.

=== Failed attempts to organize revolt in the north and south Albania ===
The Albanian revolts in the period before the First Balkan War were organized mostly in the region of Malesia. Isa Boletini, one of the leaders of the Albanian insurgents in Kosovo vilayet, wrote a proclamation on 23 March 1911 to the Albanians in the south to join Albanians from the Kosovo vilayet in their uprising. He sent his emissaries on 15 April 1911 to pass his proclamation to the southern insurgents. One of the main tasks of the Black Society for Salvation was to organize uprisings in the southern territories. The members of the society organized a meeting in Kolonjë. The meeting was attended by the emissaries from the Kosovo vilayet who brought the proclamation of Isa Boletini. The leaders of the society decided in that meeting to organize groups of armed rebels and to launch the uprising in the south in early June 1911. The society managed to establish committees in several towns including Korçë, Elbasan, Debar and Ohrid, but it failed to maintain control over them because each committee acted on its own direction.

== Suppression of the revolt ==
After the Battle of Deçiq Ottoman government decided for peaceful means of suppression of the revolt because frequent clashes with Albanians attracted the attention of the European Great Powers.

On 11 June sultan Mehmed V visited Skopje where he was greeted enthusiastically by the local population together with two Albanian chieftains who swore their allegiance to the Ottoman sultan. On 15 June, the date of the Battle of Kosovo, he visited the site of the historical battle greeted by 100.000 people. During his visit to Kosovo vilayet he signed a general amnesty for all participants of the Albanian revolts of 1910 and 1911. He was welcomed by the choir of the Serbian Orthodox Seminary with Turkish songs and vice-consul Milan Rakić had gathered a large contingent of Serbs, but many Albanians boycotted the event.

Ottoman representatives managed to deal with the leaders of Albanian rebels in Kosovo Vilayet and Scutari Vilayet separately, because they were not united and lacked central control. The Ottoman Empire first managed to pacify the northern Albanian malësorë (highlanders) from Scutari Vilayet reaching a compromise during a meeting in Podgorica. In order to resolve the problems in the south, the Ottoman representatives invited Albanian southern leaders to a meeting in Tepelenë on 18 August 1911. They promised to meet most of their demands, like general amnesty, the opening of Albanian language schools, and the restriction that military service was to be performed only in the territory of the vilayets with substantial Albanian population. Other demands included requiring administrative officers to learn the Albanian language, and that the possession of weapons would be permitted.

Ultimately, the armed uprising was crushed by the Ottoman forces in August 1911.

== Aftermath ==
The Albanian Revolt of 1911 stimulated Albanian nationalism because it proved that it was impossible to maintain the unity of the population of the Ottoman Empire even in the case of a Muslim community. Montenegrin king Nikola composed a poem The Uprising of Malisores (Serbian: Малисорски устанак 1911) in honor of this uprising.

== Flag ==
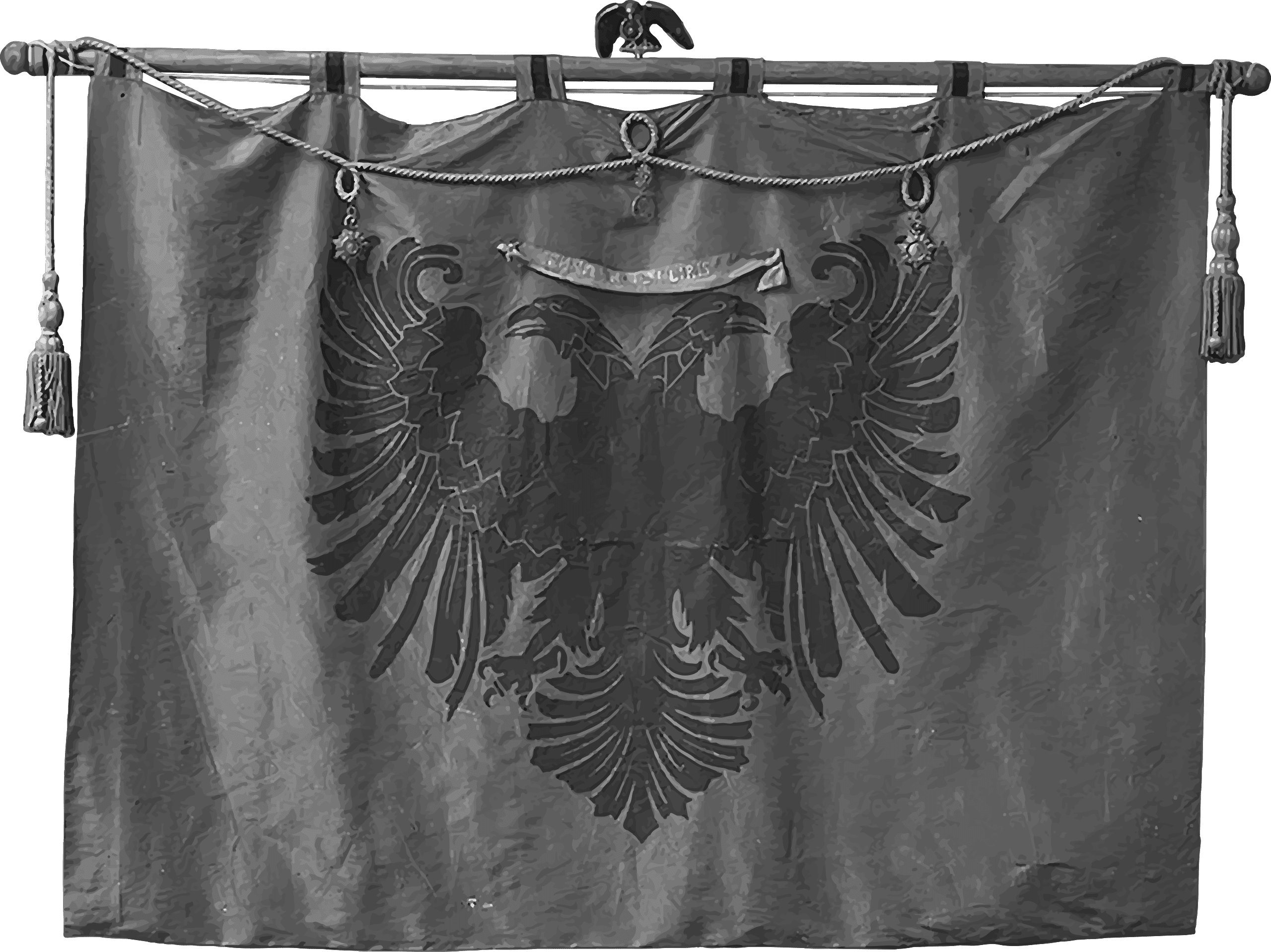
Flag raised in Deçiq by Kol Ded Gjoni.

In the spring of 1911, teacher and poet Palok Traboini, then serving as personal secretary to Ded Gjo Luli, while journing through Dalmatia brought along with him three flags and delivered them to Ded Gjo Luli of Hoti, Dok Ujka of Gruda and Prel Luca of Triepshi respectively. The flags had been fabricated in Vienna, Austria at the request of Aladro Kastriota and were a gift for the fighting insurgents of Malesia. One of the flags was first unfurled at the Church of Traboini in Hot on 6 April 1911 by Kol Ded Gjoni, son of Ded Gjo Luli and later raised several times by his fighters on top of the Bratila peak. Placed on the flag was a piece of cloth with the inscription "Flamuri i Liris" Mars 1911 and on the carrying spear can be seen the figurine of an eagle with flapping wings. The flag appeared in the form of a labarum, in the style of Roman legions.

On 13 July 1911, the Basque magazine Euskal-Herria published a letter addressed to the senior editor of the magazine that was written by Juan Aladro de Kastriota and signed in Euskara:

«The signs of sympathy that I have received from everywhere on the occasion of my last campaign, are to me comforting in a high degree and give me strength to continue the titanic and unequal struggle to give my poor Albania her freedom. God will have mercy on us and he will surely help us. The Battle of Derelik, new Albanian Covadonga, confirms my faith. Now I am here, resting my old bones and ready to start the fight, if the Turks do not give us the promised autonomy."

Milloi bat ezker bere maitagarria gatik ta eskumuñak.

— ALADRO.»

The only remaining evidence of the flag is a photograph by Kel Marubi which is presently archived at the National Museum of Photography.

== See also ==
- Albanian Revolt of 1910
- Kimza Government
- Tringe Smajli
- Albanian Revolt of 1912
- Sokol Baci
