= Ded Gjo Luli =

Albanian guerilla fighter during the 1911 revolt against the Ottoman Empire

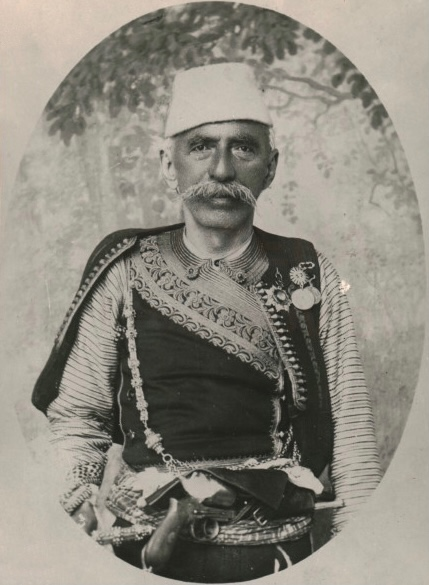
- Photo of Ded Gjo Luli
- Born: November 1840; Trabojin, Sanjak of Scutari, Ottoman Empire (now in Podgorica, Montenegro)
- Died: 24 September 1915 (aged 74); Orosh, Principality of Albania
- Cause of death: Assassinated
- Occupation: Clan chieftain
- Known for: Commander of the 1911 revolt and Battle of Deçiq
- Awards: Hero of the People

Dedë Gjon Luli Dedvukaj, also referred to as Ded Gjo Luli and Deda (November 1840 – 24 September 1915), was an Albanian guerrilla leader most notable for commanding the Malissori uprising against Ottoman troops. He was posthumously awarded the "Hero of Albania" title. Dedvukaj was the clan chieftain of the Hoti tribe.

== Early life ==
Dedvukaj was born in the village of Traboin, at the time part of the Sanjak of Scutari of the Ottoman Empire (now in Tuzi Municipality, Montenegro) as the first and only son of Gjon Luli. He was named after his grandfather, Ded Broci. He belonged to the Dedvukaj family (or brotherhood) of the Hoti tribe. In the late Ottoman period, Hoti was regarded the foremost bajrak of the Malësia e Madhe region. His family remained prominent in Hoti affairs after his death: his son Gjelosh Luli commanded fighters against Ottoman and Serbian forces in the following years, and Gjelosh's wife, Nora of Hoti (also known as Nora Luli), organized a women's unit that gathered intelligence and transported weapons for the Hoti resistance. Dedvukaj adhered to Roman Catholicism.

== League of Prizren ==
A member of the League of Prizren, Ded Gjoni participated in the conflicts in Plav and Gusinje (1879–80) that resisted the decision of the Congress of Berlin (June–July 1878) to cede Ottoman territories to the Principality of Montenegro (as part of ending the Great Eastern Crisis). As the cession of Plav and Gusinje was proven impossible without bloodbath, the Ottoman Empire ceded Ulqin in January 1880 as compensation.

== Albanian rebellions ==
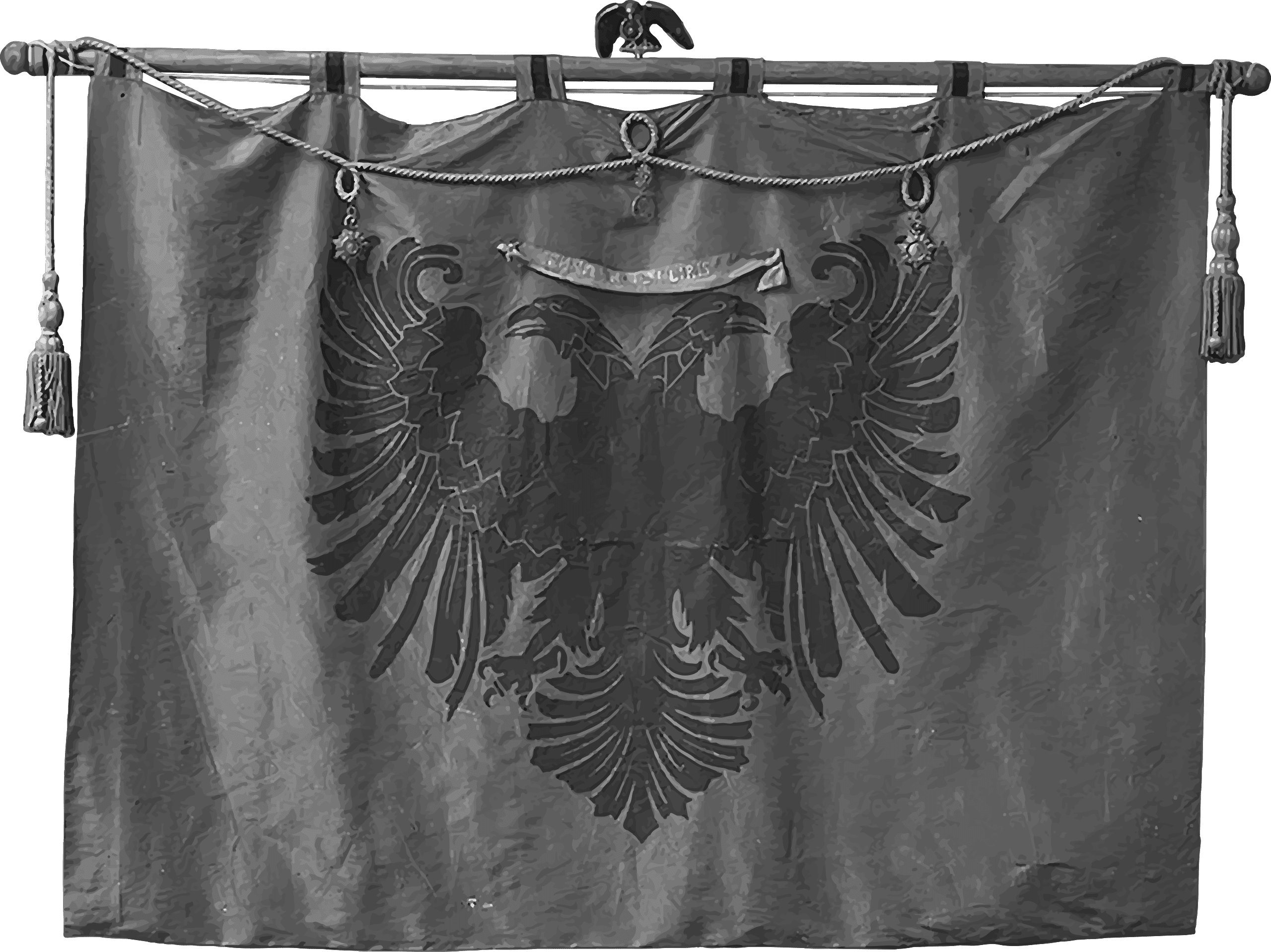
Albanian flag raised in Deçiq by Ded Gjo Luli and his men in 1911.

During the Albanian revolt of 1910 and amidst the campaign by Ottoman forces to restore order in the Malësia highlands, Dedvukaj and his tribe Hoti along with the highlanders of Shalë defied the vali of Shkodër and refused to pay taxes or give up their arms.

By the beginning of 1911, Roman Catholic Albanians were disturbed by the Ottoman situation in the Balkans. Montenegrin king Nikola Petrović encouraged the northern Albanian tribes (Malissori) to revolt against the Ottoman Empire. In the highlands north of Shkodër an uprising broke out by March 1911 and Luli along with his men attacked Ottoman watch-posts on the Ottoman-Montenegrin border. After having led a premature rebellion in the mountains north of Scutari in late March 1911, succeeding in capturing Tuzi, Dedvukaj was compelled by King Nikola to rally the Malissori in April. Albanian rebels and refugees from the Kosovo Vilayet had been given refuge in Montenegro. General Vukotić himself passed out weapons to them, despite the fact that Montenegro was officially neutral. Rebels were returned across the frontier, and some 8,000 men, with Montenegrin supply of arms, ammunition and advice, fought against Ottoman divisions, defeating the large contingent of Shefket Turgut Pasha several times. After the victory at Deçiq, an Albanian flag was symbolically raised on the Bratile mountain, symbolizing the return of the flag of Skanderbeg.

According to accounts recorded by other Wikipedia-sourced Albanian historiography, the flag itself was raised by his brother, Nikë Gjelosh Luli, who was among seven Albanian tribesmen killed in the fighting around Deçiq that day, against roughly thirty Ottoman dead. The British writer and Balkan traveler Edith Durham, who was present in Montenegro and northern Albania throughout the revolt, described in her firsthand account The Struggle for Scutari (1914) the wider collapse of the insurgency's supply lines that spring — including fighting around Traboina, Luli's own native village, which the Malësor fighters were ultimately unable to hold against Ottoman machine-gun positions.

== Legacy ==
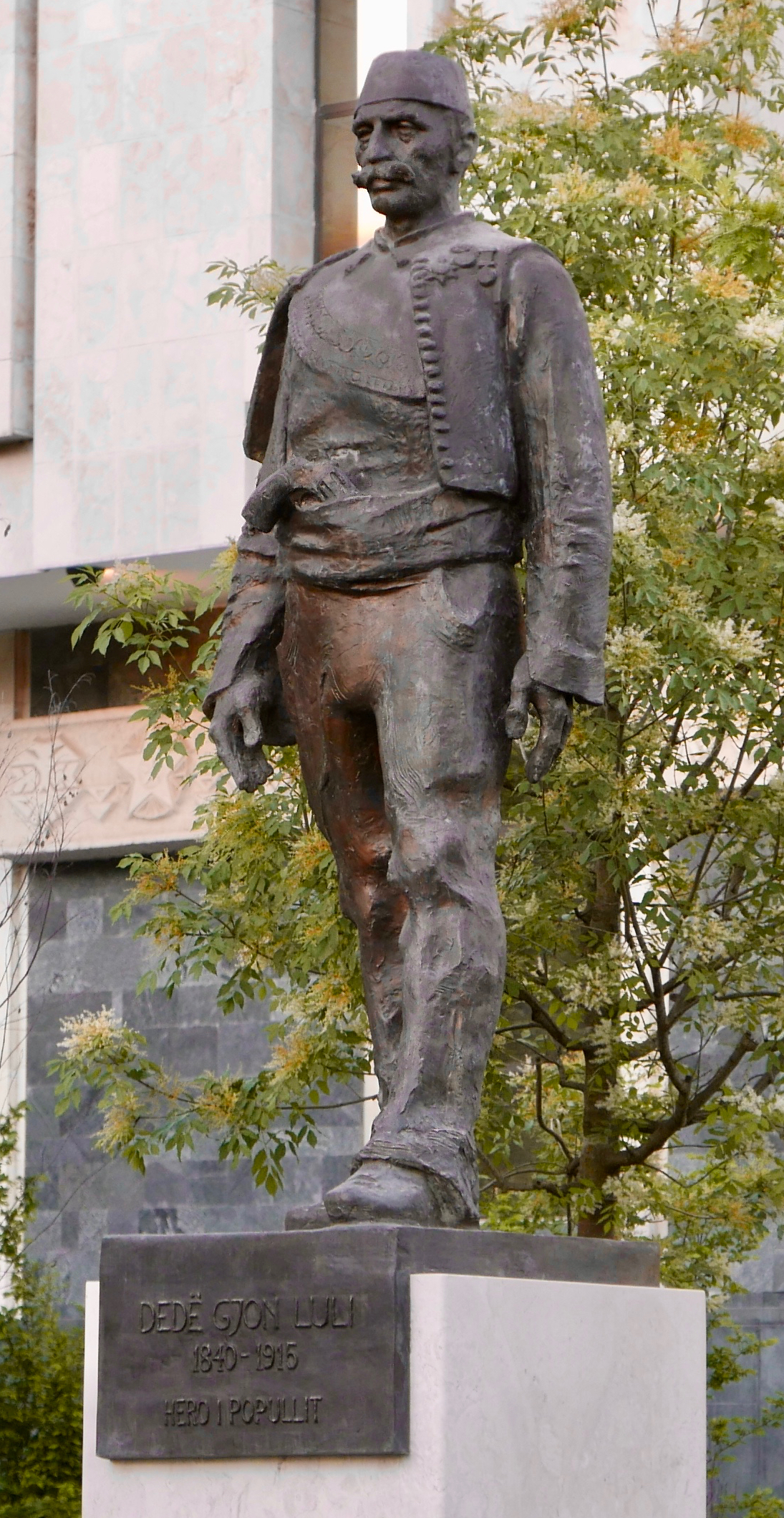
Statue of Ded Gjon Luli Dedvukaj In Tirana, Albania

Dedë Gjon Luli is most known for starting the revolution for the Albanians, which eventually led to later actions by Luigj Gurakuqi, Ismail Kemal, and Isa Boletini. In Tirana, Albania's capital city, there is a street named in his honor called "Rruga Ded Gjo Luli". In the village of Bardhaj in Hot, the rubble of his house, that was left in ruins after the war, was converted into a museum which represents his life as a hero to the Albanian people.

An epic poem on his 1910–11 fight against the Ottomans was written by Gjergj Fishta. The canto, titled "Dedë Gjo' Luli," is the twenty-eighth song of the poem's thirty cantos and depicts him addressing his men and refusing an Ottoman pasha's demand for submission. An English translation appears in Gjergj Fishta, The Highland Lute, translated by Robert Elsie and Janice Mathie-Heck (London: I.B. Tauris, 2005).

== Death ==
In September 1915, Dedë Gjon Luli, roughly 75 years old, was walking along a road in Orosh, when he was ambushed by Serbian or Montenegrin forces. Although there is another less popular theory of his death. It is said that Ded Gjo Luli went to secretly meet up with Gjonmarkaj's of Mirdita and that Mirdita's captain assassinated him. They say that the Mirditor Gjonmarkaj's along with Esad Pasha were on the Serbian side.
