= Malësia =

Historical region in southern Europe

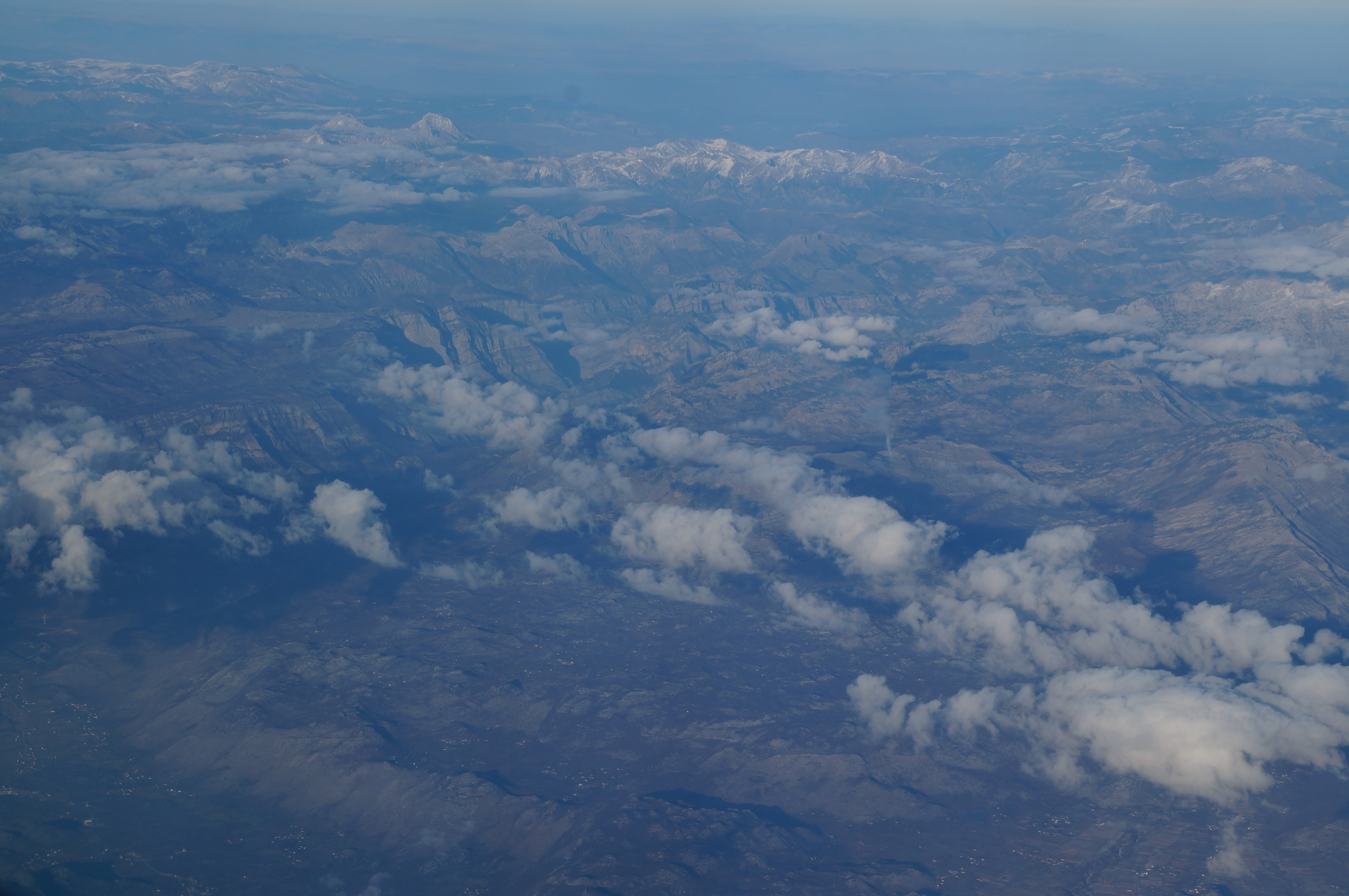
View of mountains in the region.

Malësia e Madhe ("Great Highlands"), known simply as Malësia (Tosk Albanian: Malësia, Gheg Albanian: Malcía, Montenegrin: Malesija / Малесија), is a historical and ethnographic region in northern Albania and eastern central Montenegro corresponding to the highlands of the geographical subdivision of the Malësi e Madhe District in Albania and Tuzi Municipality in Montenegro. The largest settlement in the area is the town of Tuzi.

== Name ==
Malësia e Madhe is Albanian for "great highlands". It is simply known as Malësia, or in the local Gheg dialect, Malcía (Albanian pronunciation: [malsia]). Elsie also describes the region as part of the Northern Albanian Alps. The tribes are commonly called "highlanders", Albanian: malësorët, malsort, anglicized as "Malissori" or "Malisors". An archaic term used by foreign travellers in the 1860s was "Malesians".

== Geography ==
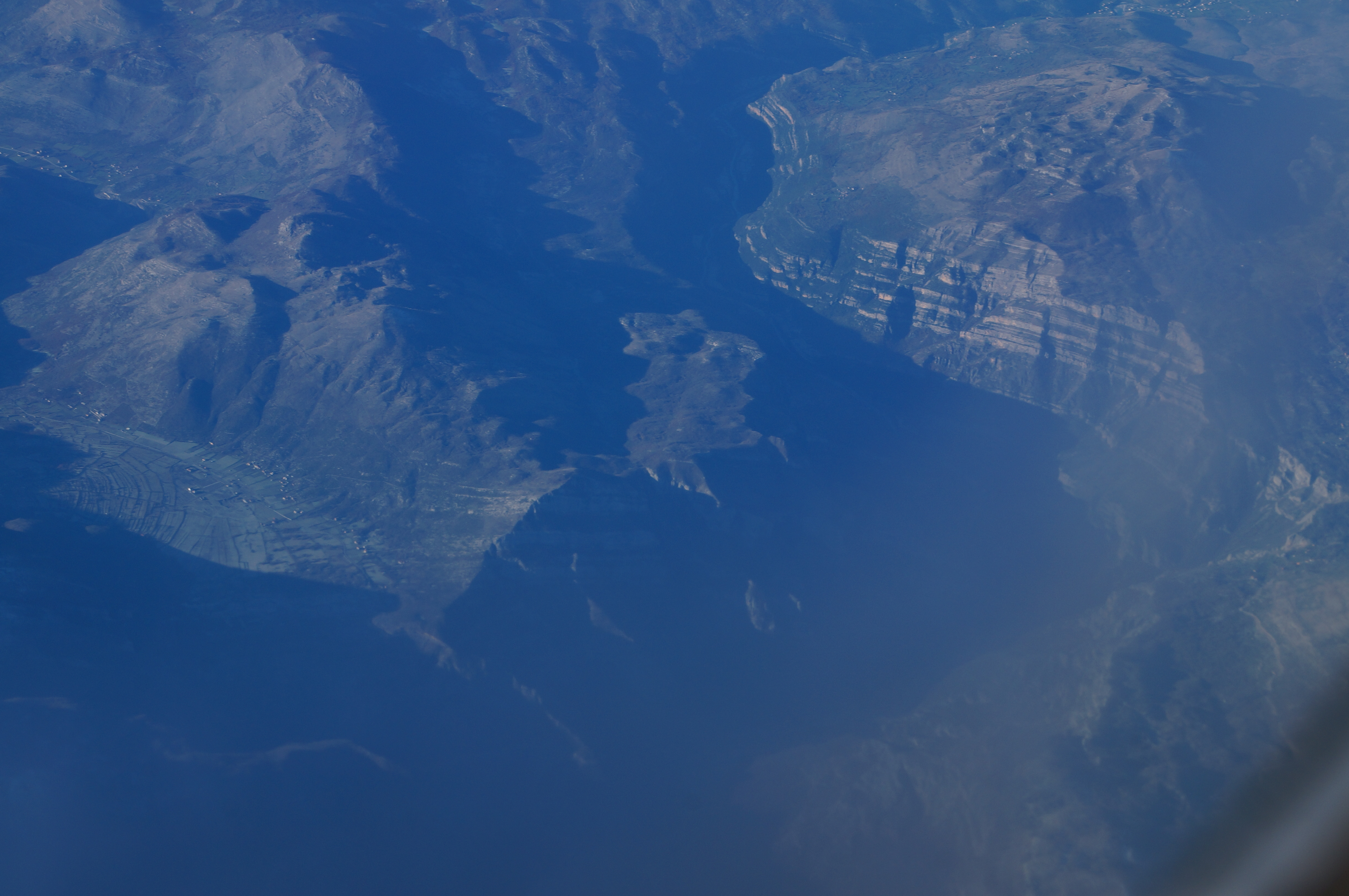
Cem valley in Albania.

The region includes parts of the Accursed Mountains mountain range (known in Albanian as Bjeshkët e Nemuna) and hinterland of the Lake Scutari, with valleys of the Cem river.

The Malësors (Albanian highlanders) live within northern Albania and historically Malësia e Madhe (great highlands) contained seven large tribes with six (Hoti, Kelmendi, Trieshi, Koja, Shkreli, Kastrati) having a Catholic majority and Muslim minority with Gruda evenly split between both religions. Within Malësia e Madhe there were an additional seven small tribes. During times of war and mobilisation of troops, the bajraktar (chieftain) of Hoti was recognised by the Ottoman government as leader of all forces of the Malësia e Madhe tribes having collectively some 6,200 rifles during the late Ottoman period. Malësia e Vogël (small highlands) with seven Catholic tribes such as the Shala with 4 bajaraktars, Shoshi, Toplana and Nikaj contained some 1,250 households with a collective strength of 2,500 men that could be mobilised for war. Shoshi had a distinction in the region of possessing a legendary rock associated with Lekë Dukagjini.

== History ==
During the Ottoman period, when northern Albania was part of the Sanjak of Scutari, Albanian tribes in Malësia sometimes sided with Montenegrin tribes in fighting the Ottomans. An example is from 1658, when the seven tribes of Kuči, Vasojevići, Bratonožići, Piperi, Kelmendi, Hoti and Gruda allied themselves with the Republic of Venice against the Ottomans. In 1757, the Bushati family transformed the sanjak into the semi-autonomous Pashalik of Scutari. After this, the Albanian tribes sided with the Bushati.

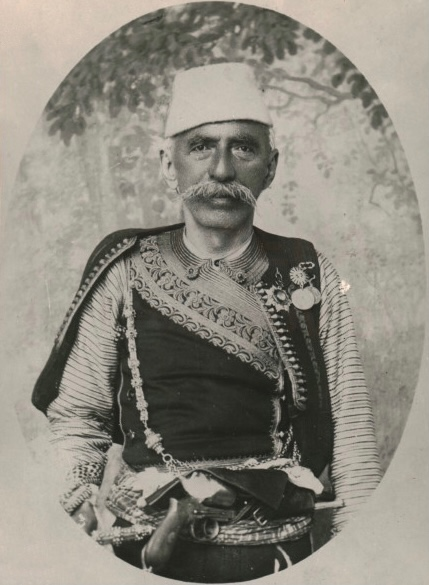
Ded Gjo Luli.

After the Ottoman Empire lost the Montenegrin–Ottoman War (1876–78), Plav and Gusinje were ceded to Montenegro, which sparked Albanian attacks in the area organized by the nationalist League of Prizren in support of the Ottoman Empire. Later, in the early 20th century, the northern Albanian tribes switched sides against the Ottoman Empire and rose up with Serbian aid in 1910 and Montenegrin aid in 1911. The latter began with a memorandum signed by the Malësian tribal representatives.

The Malësian tribes won a victory at Deçiq in April 1911. The Albanian revolt of 1912 led to the Albanian Declaration of Independence later that year. On May 26, 1913, 130 leaders of Gruda, Hoti, Kelmendi, Kastrati and Shkreli sent a petition to Cecil Burney in Shkodër against the incorporation of their territories into Montenegro. Gruda and parts of Hoti came under Montenegrin rule.

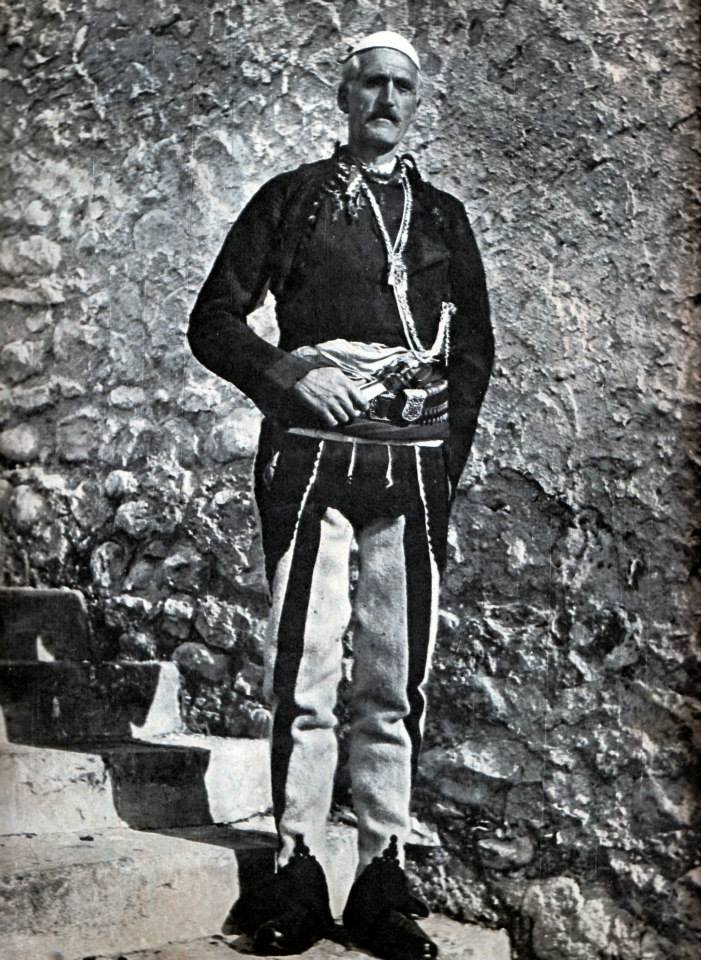
Prek Cali.

During World War II, the northern Albanian tribes collaborated with Nazi Germany, Fascist Italy, and later, the Italian Social Republic. They fought against the Yugoslav Partisans and held specific anti-Communist ideology. Prek Cali led the Kelmendi tribe. Some leaders were persecuted by the Party of Labour of Albania after the war.

== Demographics ==
The region is inhabited by an Albanian majority, divided between Catholicism and Islam, while a small Serb-Montenegrin community is present in some villages. The Albanian population ethnographically belongs to the Ghegs group.

In Montenegro:

- Albanians - 7,839 (75.8%)
- Montenegrins - 823 (8.0%)
- Bosniaks - 627 (6.1%)
- Ethnic Muslims - 635 (6.1%)
- Serbs - 156 (1.5%)
- Romani - 62 (0.6%)
- Others - 120 (1.2%)
- No Ethnicity Declared - 77 (0.7%)
- Total - 10,339

== Culture ==
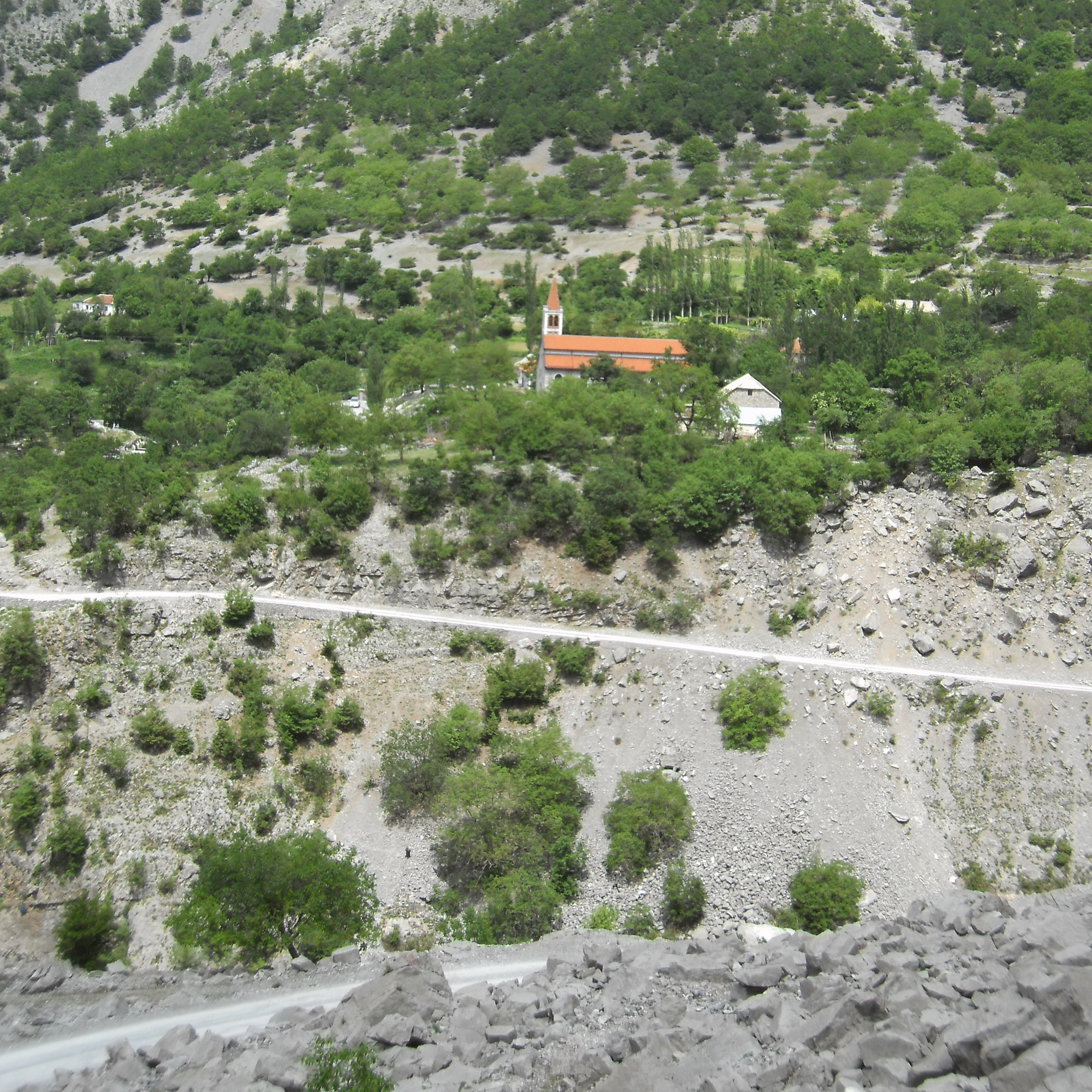
Catholic church in the heights of the Selcë village.

Due to its culture, the highland region has attracted anthropologists, artists, writers and scholars more than any other Albanian-populated region. It is Malësia that produced what has been considered the national epic of the Albanian people, Lahuta e Malcís (The Highland Lute). Author and Franciscan friar Gjergj Fishta spent 35 years composing this poem, in which is chronicled the whole range of the ethnic Albanian cultural experience (e.g. weddings, funerals, historical battles, mythology, genealogy, and tribal law). It is as interesting to modern readers as an anthropological document as it is a poem.

Anton Harapi, Albania's most distinguished Christian philosopher, dedicated his masterpiece "Ândrra e Pretashit" (The Dream of Pretash), initially called "The Wise Men along Cemi River" to the people of Malcía.

The oldest Albanian book was written by Malësor Catholic priest Gjon Buzuku.

== Ethnography ==
In 1908, anthropologist Edith Durham visited the Malësia region and catalogued her findings in her ethnographic work "High Albania," which was, for nearly a century, the most trusted source of information about the Albanian highlanders. Albanian anthropologist Kolë Berisha wrote, among other books, the four-volumes ethnography entitled "Malcía e Madhe" written between 1900 and 1945.

=== Tribes ===
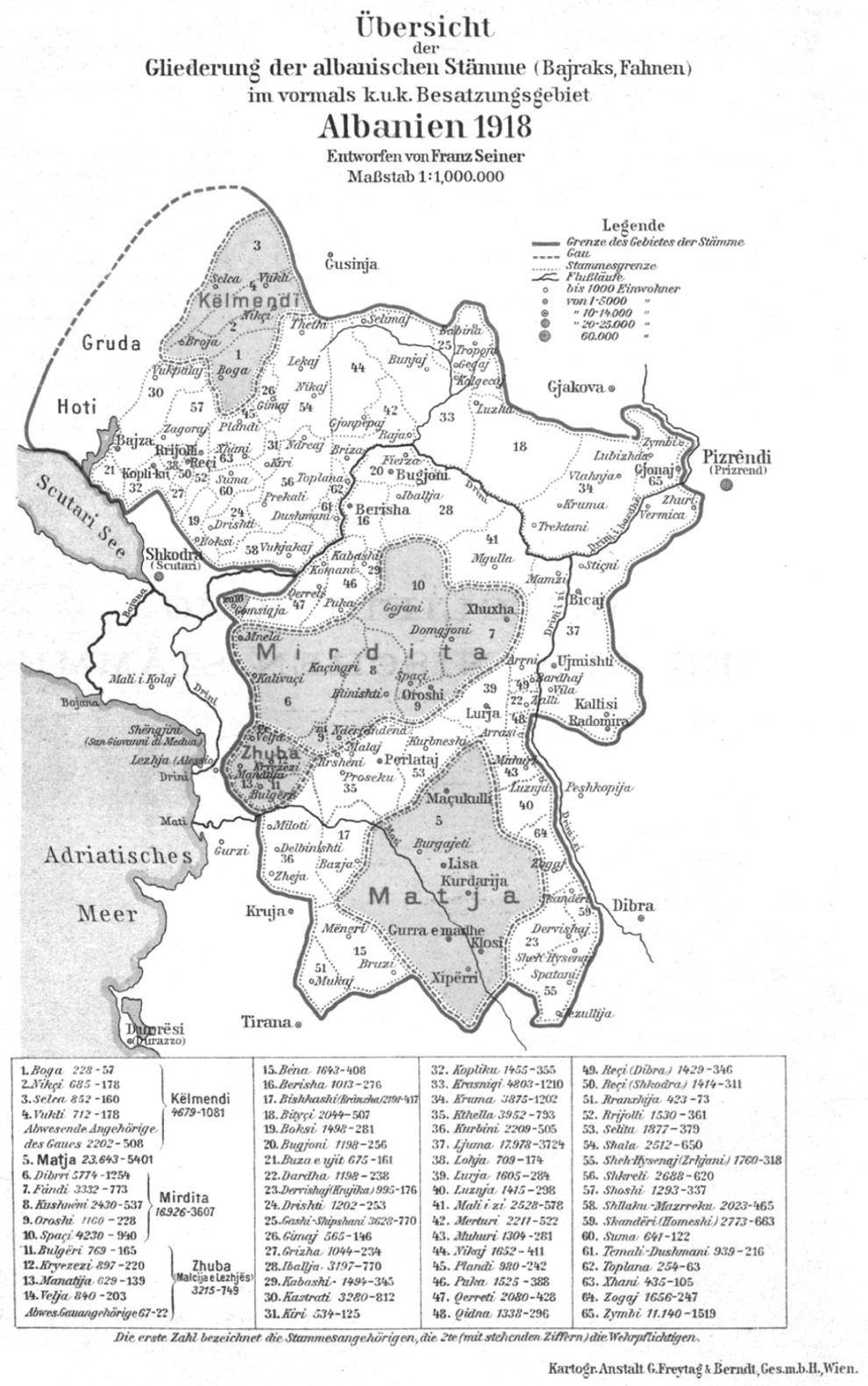
Albanian bajraks (1918).

Robert Elsie divided the tribes of Albania in his works according to regions. There were ten tribes that belonged to the Malësia e Madhe in the Northern Albanian Alps.

- Kelmendi
- Gruda (in Montenegro)
- Hoti (partially in Montenegro)
- Kastrati
- Shkreli
- Triesh
- Koja

The histories of the respective clans (and hence the whole region) are amalgamations of both historical events and genealogies passed along by oral transmission.

== Notable people ==
- Prek Cali, Kelmendi chieftain
- Ded Gjo Luli (1840–1915), Hoti chieftain
- Sokol Baci (1837–1920), Gruda chieftain
- Baca Kurti (1807–1881), Gruda chieftain
- Tringë Smajli (1880–1917), Gruda member
- Nora of Kelmendi
- Elseid Hysaj, Albanian footballer, defender
- Bekim Balaj, Albanian footballer, attacker
- Armando Broja, Albanian footballer, attacker
- Rudi Vata

== See also ==
- Albanians in Montenegro

== Sources ==
- Treadway, John D. (1983). The Falcon and the Eagle: Montenegro and Austria-Hungary, 1908-1914. Purdue University Press. ISBN 978-1-55753-146-9.
- Pearson, Owen (2004). Albania in the Twentieth Century, A History: Volume I: Albania and King Zog, 1908-39. I.B.Tauris. ISBN 978-1-84511-013-0.
- Jovićević, Andrija (1923). Малесија. SANU. OCLC 635033682.
- Slijepčević, Đoko M. (1974). Српско-арбанашки односи кроз векове са посебним освртом на новије време. Iskra.
- Durham, Mary Edith (2009) [1909]. High Albania. Echo Library. ISBN 978-1-4068-2855-9.
- Elsie, Robert (2010). Historical Dictionary of Albania. Lanham, Maryland: Scarecrow Press. ISBN 978-0-8108-7380-3.
- Elsie, Robert (2015). The Tribes of Albania: History, Society and Culture. I.B.Tauris. ISBN 9780857739322.
- Vickers, Miranda (1999). The Albanians: a modern history. I.B.Tauris. ISBN 978-1-86064-541-9.
