= Battle at the Ržanica Bridge =

- Part of Battles for Plav and Gusinje
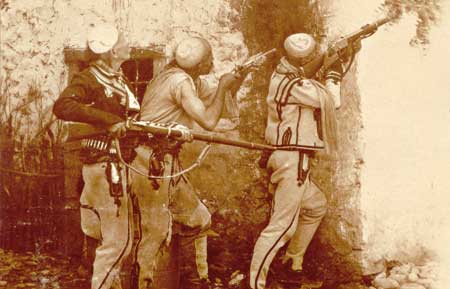
- Albanian malissori (highlanders) shooting during the Battle of Ržanica
Date	22 April 1880
Location	Ržanica Bridge, Tuzi, Ottoman Empire
Result	Albanian victory

Belligerents
Montenegro	League of Prizren; Hoti; Gruda tribe

Commanders and leaders
Petar Vukotić	Çun Mula; Baca Kurti

Strength
10,000	8,000–10,000

Casualties and losses
Heavy	Unknown

The Battle at the Ržanica Bridge (Albanian: Beteja te Ura e Rzhanicës; Serbian: Bitka kod Ržanice/Битка код Ржанице) was a significant battle between Albanian tribesmen and Montenegrin forces during the Battles for Plav and Gusinje. The battle played a crucial role in preventing the annexation of the tribal lands of Gruda and Hoti by Montenegro.

== Background ==
The Montenegrin–Ottoman War (1876–78) concluded with a defeat for the Ottoman Empire, leading to significant geopolitical changes in the Balkans. Under the Treaty of Berlin, the Ottoman Empire formally recognized the independence of Montenegro and granted it certain territorial gains. As part of the treaty's compensation for territories in Herzegovina that Montenegro had captured during the war, the regions of Plav and Gusinje, previously part of the Scutari Vilayet in the Ottoman Empire, were awarded to Montenegro. Initially, until October 1879, Montenegrin forces could advance into these territories without encountering resistance. However, when Montenegro prepared to conduct a military expedition into Plav and Gusinje, the Ottomans intervened diplomatically with the Great Powers to prevent it, aiming to avoid potential conflicts. Austria-Hungary played a key role in this diplomatic effort, concerned that Montenegro might use Plav and Gusinje as a strategic base to further its territorial ambitions toward Metohija. To address the ensuing tensions, Ali Pasha of Gucia, along with the Italian ambassador in Istanbul, Count Luigi Corti, proposed a compromise known as the Corti Compromise. This solution suggested that Montenegro be granted the territory along the Cem River, including the tribal lands of Gruda and Hoti, as an alternative. Montenegro was scheduled to occupy this region on April 22, 1880.

== Battle ==
The Turkish forces were scheduled to withdraw from Tuzi and the points to be handed over to Montenegro on April 22, 1880, at 4:30 in the afternoon. The Ottomans began their withdrawal at the appointed time. The forces of the League of Prizren, which had been guarding those areas for days, saw the Ottomans retreating and seized the Ržanica Bridge over the Cem River, where the road leading the Montenegrin armies from Podgorica to Tuzi passed. They quickly took control of other points vacated by the Ottomans.

Kristo Frashëri recounts the testimonies of P. Tonieti regarding the moments when the Ottomans were retreating from the fortress of Tuzi. According to Tonieti, when the Turkish units were retreating from the fortress, the Albanian tribesmen attacked them, threatening to open fire if they attempted to take any war material with them. Not wanting to engage in an armed conflict with the Albanians, the Ottomans quickly left without taking the material that was still in Tuzi. As a result, the Albanian tribesmen acquired a significant amount of military supplies, including 4,000 boxes of ammunition, 560 "Martina" rifles, 60 bags of biscuits, 20 bags of rice, and 60 bags of flour.

As a result of these rapid actions, the situation on the Albanian-Montenegrin border changed radically. The League forces, consisting of 8,000-10,000 volunteers with their headquarters established immediately in Tuz, faced 12 Montenegrin battalions totaling about 10,000 soldiers commanded by Petar Vukotić.

On April 22, the Montenegrin army split into two columns and advanced toward Tuzi, one column moved toward the Ržanica Bridge, while the other headed for the village of Dunosh.. Upon reaching the banks of the Cem River, the Montenegrin armies were asked to turn back but were instead furiously attacked. the Montenegrin army, after significant losses, was forced to withdraw to Podgorica.

== Aftermath ==
This second failure of Montenegro forced the Great Powers to seize the opportunity to give Montenegro the city of Ulcinj. The Great Powers then persuaded the Ottomans to cede the area of Ulcinj, but the Albanians of the League of Prizren yet again refused. Eventually, the Great Powers commanded the Ottomans to take action against the League of Prizren, ending the resistance and successfully handing over the town of Ulcinj to Montenegro.
