= Battles for Plav and Gusinje =

Conflicts in Montenegro (1879–1880)

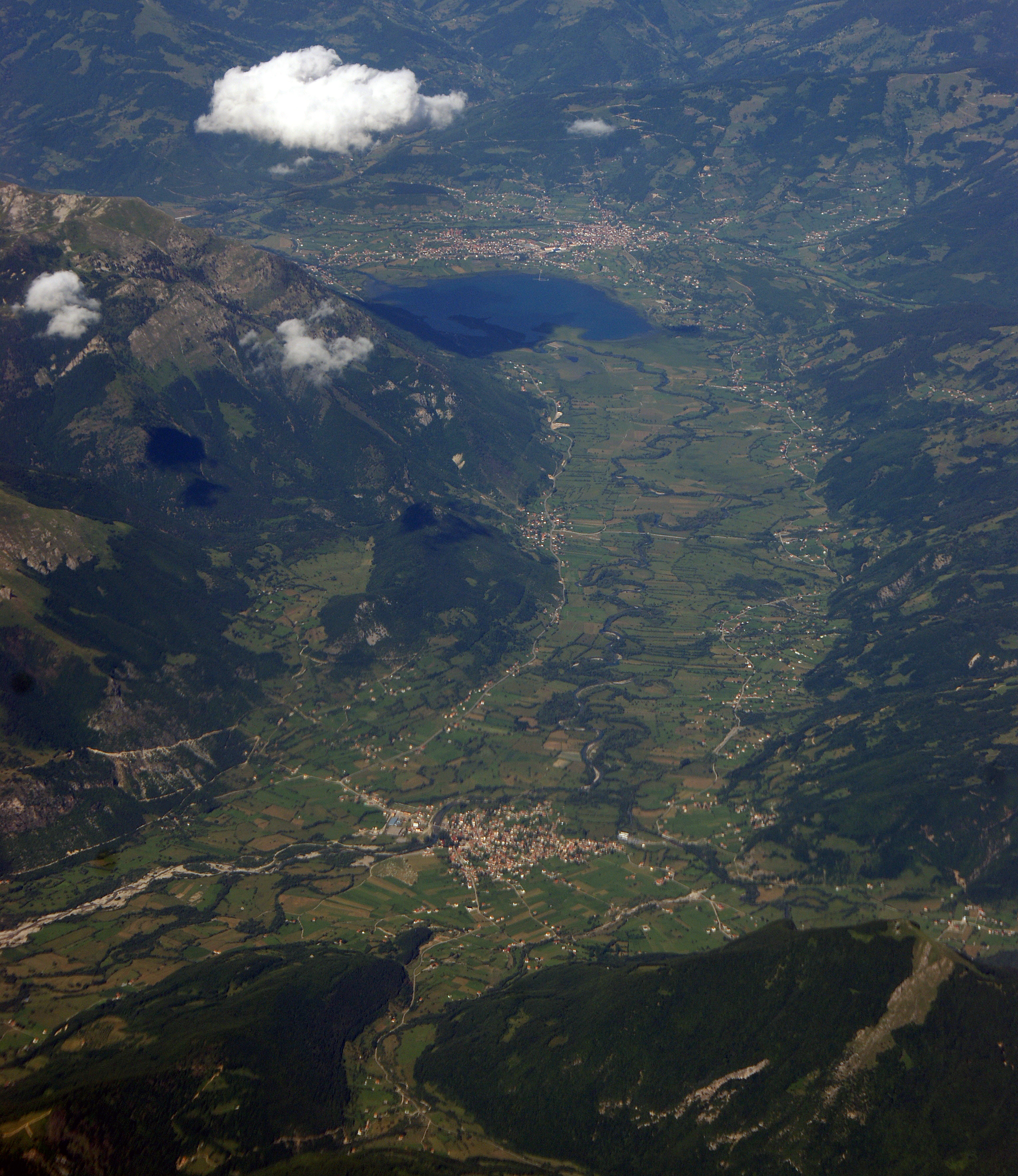
Date	9 October 1879 – 22 April 1880
Location	Plav and Gusinje
Result	Albanian victory

Belligerents
League of Prizren	Principality of Montenegro

Commanders and leaders
Ali Pasha of Gusinje; Baca Kurti; Jakup Ferri †; Haxhi Zeka; Ahmet Zenel Gjonbalaj; Cel Shabani; Mic Sokoli; Sali Jaha; Çun Mula; Haxhi Mulla Jaha; Kadri Bajri (Commander of Rugova forces); Myrtez-aga Batusha (Commander of Reka forces); Haxhi Brahimi (Bajraktar of Gashi) †; Isuf Karna (Bajraktar of Krasniqi); Omer Bashulaj †; Husein-beg Rexhepagaj; Husein Bekteshaj; Matko Laliçaj; Bilal-aga Shehu; Arif Bashi †; Idriz Seferi	Marko Miljanov; Todor Miljanov Vuković; Miljan Vukov Vešović priest Đoko

Units involved
Albanian irregulars	Moračani battalion Bratonožići battalion Kuči battalion Vasojevići battalion

Strength
10,000–20,000	10,000–20,000

Casualties and losses
More than 649 irregulars killed	More than 2,000 soldiers killed

The Battles for Plav and Gusinje were armed conflicts between the Principality of Montenegro and the League of Prizren (supported by the Ottoman Empire) that broke out following the decision of the Congress of Berlin (1878) that the territories of Plav and Gusinje (part of former Scutari Vilayet) be ceded to Montenegro. The conflicts took place in this territory between 9 October 1879 and 22 April 1880. The following battles were fought:

- Velika attacks (9 October – 22 November 1879), Montenegrin victory in the first attack, Albanian victory in the second attack
- Battle of Novšiće (4 December 1879), Albanian victory
- Battle of Murino (8 January 1880), both sides claim victory
- Battle at the Ržanica Bridge (22 April 1880), Albanian Victory
