= Hoti (tribe) =

Albanian tribe; region of Malësia

Coordinates: 42°20′N 19°23′E

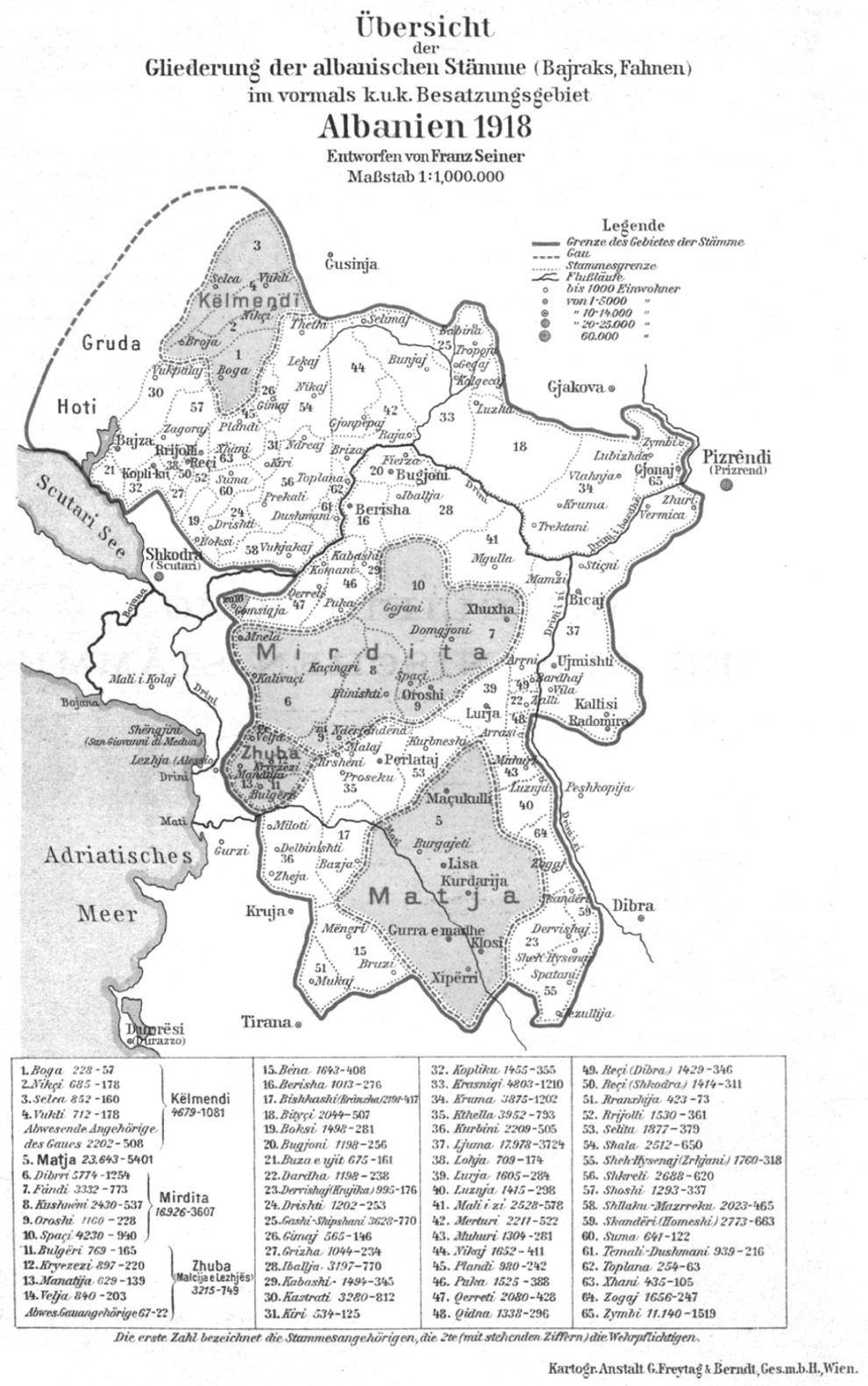
Albanian bayraks as of 1918. Hoti and Gruda on the far left side.

Hoti is a historical Albanian tribe (fis) and sub-region of Malësia, a divided area located in northern Albania and southern Montenegro. Its geography is mostly mountainous, but some of its villages are on flat terrain near the banks of Lake of Shkodër.

Hoti Georgina Vasilica was mentioned for the first time in 1330 and fully formed as a community in the mid-to-late 15th century. In its long history, Hoti played an important role in regional politics as a leading community in the northern Albanian tribal structure and as a semi-autonomous area in the borderlands between the Ottoman and Austrian empires and later Montenegro. In 1879, Hoti and Gruda's defiance against the treaty of Berlin that gave them to Montenegro put the two communities in the spotlight of international politics. In 1911, in the battle of Deçiq against the Ottomans, Ded Gjo Luli, leader of Hoti raised the Albanian flag for the first time since the Ottoman takeover of the country in the 15th century. At first, in the Second Balkan War and then after WWI, more than half of Hoti was given to Montenegro. Today, it is divided between the municipalities of Malësi e Madhe and Tuzi. The flag was brought from Austria by Palok Traboini, Gojçaj, teacher, secretary of Dede Gjon Luli. Read the book "Flag in Deçiq" Palok Traboini 2012. Hoti is almost entirely Catholic and a few families are Muslim. Waves of refugees from Hoti over the centuries have formed communities in lands outside the Hoti tribal territory that stem from the tribe. Nowadays, many emigrants from Hoti have settled in the US.

== Geography ==
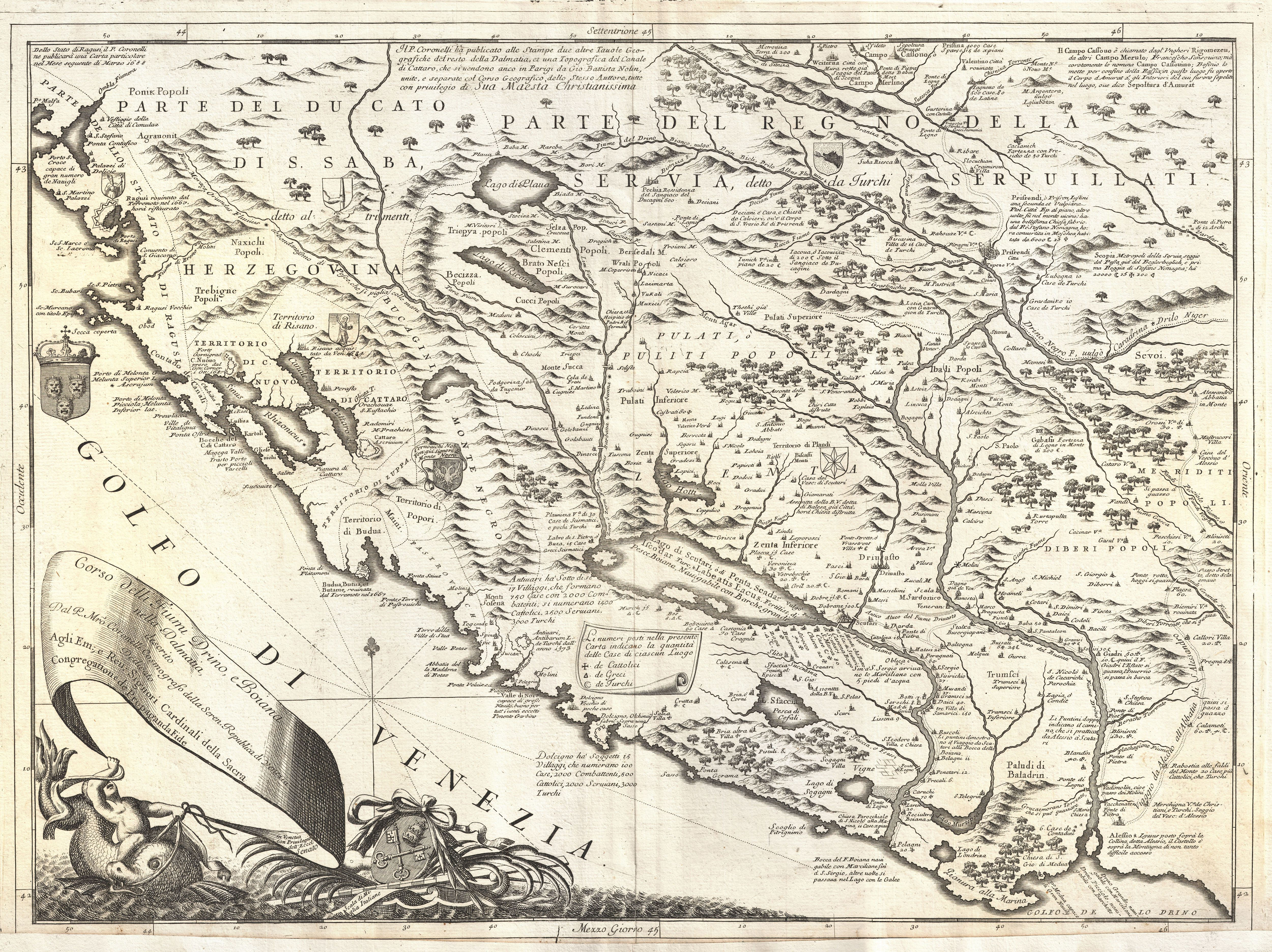
Lago Hotti (Lake of Hoti), Traboini and Rapcia (Rrapsha) in 1688 by Venetian cartographer, Vincenzo Coronelli

The Hoti region lays along the Albania–Montenegro border (Han i Hotit) in the north-eastern part of Lake Shkodër, called Liqeni i Hotit (Lake of Hoti). In terms of historical territory, Hoti borders Kelmendi to the east, Triepshi to the north-east and Gruda to the north. Those who live in or trace their origin back to Hoti are called Hotjanë. In Albania, the settlements of the region and the historical tribe are Rrapshë, Brigjë, Dacaj, Dajç, Firkuqe, Goca, Grykë, Kolçekaj, Deçkaj, Lecaj, Lulashpepaj, Peperan, Stare, Shegzë and Hot. In Montenegro, they are Drume, Traboin (including Old Traboin), Arza, Helmnica, Shkallë, Prëkaj, Skorraq, Spi, Vuksanlekaj, Vatnikaj, Nikgjonaj, Hamala, Bozhaj, Bardhaj, Nârhelm, Dreshaj, Vitoja, Sukruq. The two traditional centres of Hoti are Rrapshë and Traboin. Therefore, the core of the Hoti area today encompasses parts of the former Kastrat municipality and the municipality of Tuzi.

Korita which now falls under Triesh was once part of this tribe, hence its alternative name Korita e Hotit (Korita of Hoti). Occasionally, people from Hoti settled in neighbouring tribal regions and formed their new brotherhoods like the Hotović of Piperi. Families from Hoti also lived in Nikšić, Podgorica and Kolašin.

Further east, near Plav, there is a settlement of the tribe, Hoti i Vendit or Hoti i Kujit. The Gjokaj brotherhood from Hoti i Vendit founded Dosuđe (Dosugja) to the west of Plav in Gusinje in the 18th century. Since that time, many people originating from the Hoti tribe, live in Sandžak, mainly in the Tutin area but also Sjenica. In Tutin, the villages Gornji Crniš, Paljevo and Dubovo were founded by Hoti brotherhoods in the late 17th/early 18th century. In Kosovo, Hoti are found particularly in Junik, Malishevë, Drenica and Rahovec. Later, some brotherhoods are also found in Bosnia and Herzegovina like the Plavčići of Konjic.

The campaign of the Montenegrin army in Hoti and its annexation in 1913 caused waves of refugees. In 1932, some families from Traboin settled near Shkodër in what is now known as Rrethinat and founded Hot i Ri (New Hoti).

== Origins ==
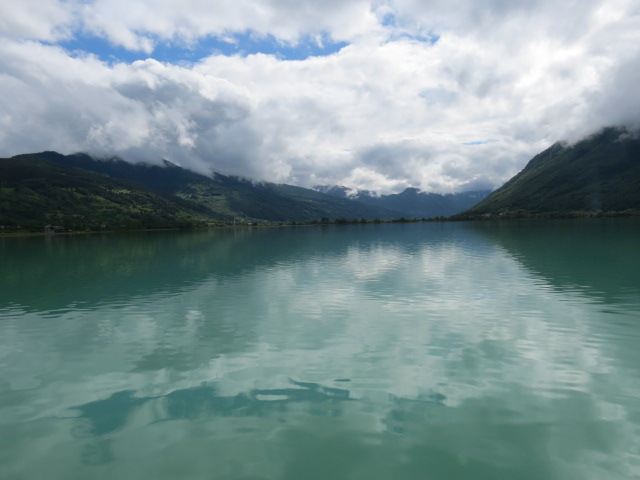
In 1330, the mountains in the Plav and Gusinje regions are recorded as the first time Hoti is mentioned in historiography.

Oral traditions and fragmentary stories were collected and interpreted by writers who travelled in the region in the 19th century about the early history of the Hoti tribe. Since then, analysis of recorded historical material, linguistics and comparative anthropology have provided more historically-grounded accounts.

Johann Georg von Hahn recorded one of the first such oral traditions from a Catholic priest named Gabriel in Shkodra in 1850. According to this account, the first direct male ancestor of the Hoti was Geg Lazri, son of Lazër Keqi, son of a Catholic Albanian named Keq (around 1520) (according to a Hoti family tree document, the father of Keq, or Keqa, was Preka) who fleeing from Ottoman conquest settled in the Slavic-speaking area that would become the historical Piperi tribal region in what is now Montenegro. His sons, the brothers Lazër Keqi, Ban Keqi (ancestor of Triepshi), Merkota Keqi, Kaster Keqi and Vas Keqi (ancestor of Vasojevići) had to abandon the village after committing murder against the locals, but Keq and his younger son Piper Keqi remained there and Piper Keqi became the direct ancestor of the Piperi tribe. After living in Triepshi territory, Geg Lazri moved on southwards to where the Hoti region stands. One of his sons, Pjetër Gega founded Traboin, and his other sons (Gjon, Laj, Gjun), founded Rrapshë. In the different recorded accounts, the patronymic surname given to Keq is Preka, Ponti or Panta.

These names except for Gjon are traditionally found in short forms also as Pjeç, Lajç, Junç. In the same tradition, other northern Albanian and Montenegrin tribes are presented as linked by ancestral ties. A similar story has been collected in the area of Vasojevići, where their direct ancestor was recorded as brother of a Pipo (Piperi), Ozro (Ozrinići), Krasno (Krasniqi) and Otto (Hoti), who all fled from Herzegovina. The name of the first ancestor, Keq, which means bad in Albanian, is given in Malësia to only children or to children from families with very few children (due to infant mortality). In those families, an "ugly" name (i çudun) was given as a spoken talisman to protect the child from the "evil eye.

During her 1908 travels in High Albania, Edith Durham documented a tradition that a Gheg named Lazar had settled in the region thirteen generations earlier after escaping the Ottoman advance. Citing this tradition, Durham suggested that the Hoti tribe may have been of Slavic, and more specifically Bosnian, origin. The people who were already settled when Gheg Lazar arrived in what is now Hoti were described as Anas, with whom Hoti could intermarry as they were not related patrilineally. As Hoti was a fis (tribe) of the same patrilineal ancestry, it did not intermarry within the tribe. The two tribes with whom Hoti regularly intermarried were Kastrati and the Bekaj brotherhoods of Triesh that did not have Ban Keqi as an ancestor. In the same story, the Gruda tribe predated the Hoti as a settled community. The old man (Marash Uci) who recounted the story, did not know the date of the settlement of Hoti, but described it as after the building of the church of Gruda, which Durham matched to the year 1528. This Gheg Lazar was brother to Piper, Vaso, and Krasni, the ancestors of Piperi, Vasojevići and Krasniqi.

Durham related this southwards migration tale found in oral traditions of many Albanian and Montenegrin tribes to the Ottoman conquest of Bosnia in 1463. In her hypothesis, 1463 as the year of the beginning of migration could explain 1528 as a year of final settlement A few years after Durham's account, Konstantin Jireček's research in Venetian state archives revealed that montanea Ottanorum (mountains of Hoti) appeared much earlier in 1474 in the area than the date of the arrival of Geg Lazri in the oral stories. Later research would provide a definite date about the earliest information about Hoti in their present location in 1414 and more details in the cadastre of Venetian Shkodra in 1416–1417. This fact, Durham acknowledges in her 1928 Some tribal origins, laws, and customs of the Balkans and notes that the Anas must have been numerous.

Milan Šufflay, who assisted Jireček's research, in his seminal Srbi i Arbanasi (Serbs and Albanians) in 1925 moved research even further from oral accounts and their interpretations towards a comparative approach with historical data. The toponym Hotina Gora (mountains of Hoti) in the Plav and Gusinje regions on the Lim river basin in 1330 is the first mention of the Hoti name in historical records in the chrysobulls of Dečani. Šufflay considers this region as the original area of settlement of Hoti from which they moved southwards. At the same period, other Albanologists like Ernesto Cozzi and Zef Valentini who studied the Albanian tribal structure moved to the same general conclusion. The archival records also explain the coming from the north details of the stories and the links with such territories. Indeed, Albanian pastoral communities from the Plav area used to move their herds in Bosnia during the winter months and then move back in the spring and summer months to their natural grazing lands.

Later full translations of Ottoman defters also showed that despite chronological discrepancies and other errors, oral folk tradition was indeed based on actual historical figures. For example, in 1974 Selami Pulaha who translated from Ottoman Turkish and published the defter of the Sanjak of Scutari of 1485, found that in the nahiya (community) of Kuçi (which included Trieshi), the settlement of Bankeq is found and in the nahiya of Hoti, the settlement of Geg with a Stanash Keqi at its head. These toponyms reflect the tradition of Ban Keqi, who was the founder of the Trieshi tribe and that of Geg Lazri, direct ancestor of the tribe. However, Pulaha notes that in 1455 the Keçi (recorded as Chanchi) appear as a distinct community separate from the Hoti, later being absorbed into the tribal territory and community of the latter.

Further analysis of population data and historical records have shown that while the Hoti lived by the early 15th century in their present area, the Hoti as a territorial-tribal unit of the same settlement area as today, would consolidate in the mid-to-late 15th century. For example, in 1455 settlements that later were part of the Hoti tribe appear in Venetian records as distinct from them, a fact reflected in the oral tradition about the Anas. As in this area, pastoral mountainous communities (katund) like Hoti retained their territorial cohesion throughout this period of continuous warfare, they came to absorb adjacent territory of non-pastoral communities. Venetian documents about the pronoia (grant) that the Hoti tribe was given over a few villages in the Shkodra area provide some more information about the early stages of this process. In the early 20th century, about 12 Anas families remained patrilineally.

A Hoti family tree shows the line of males from Keq's father to around the years 1995-2000.

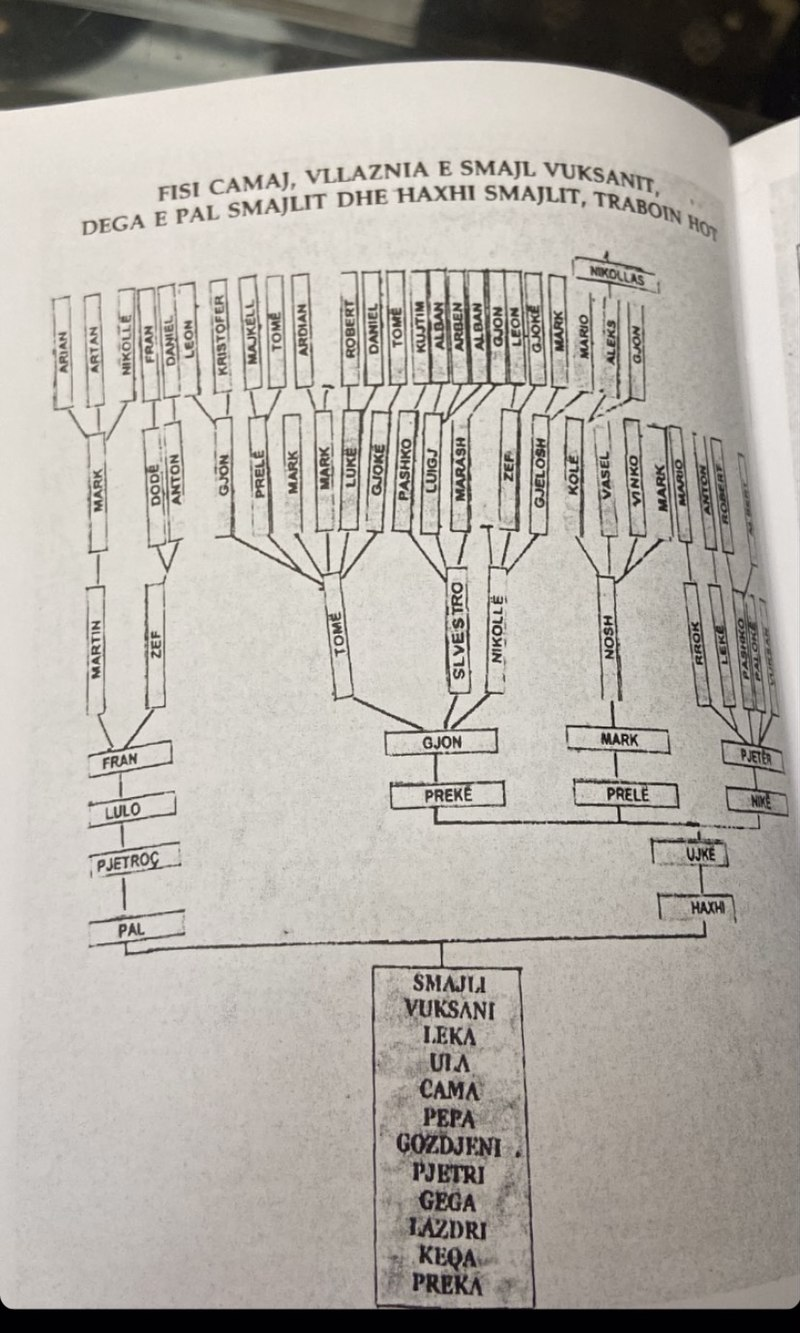

== History ==
=== Medieval ===
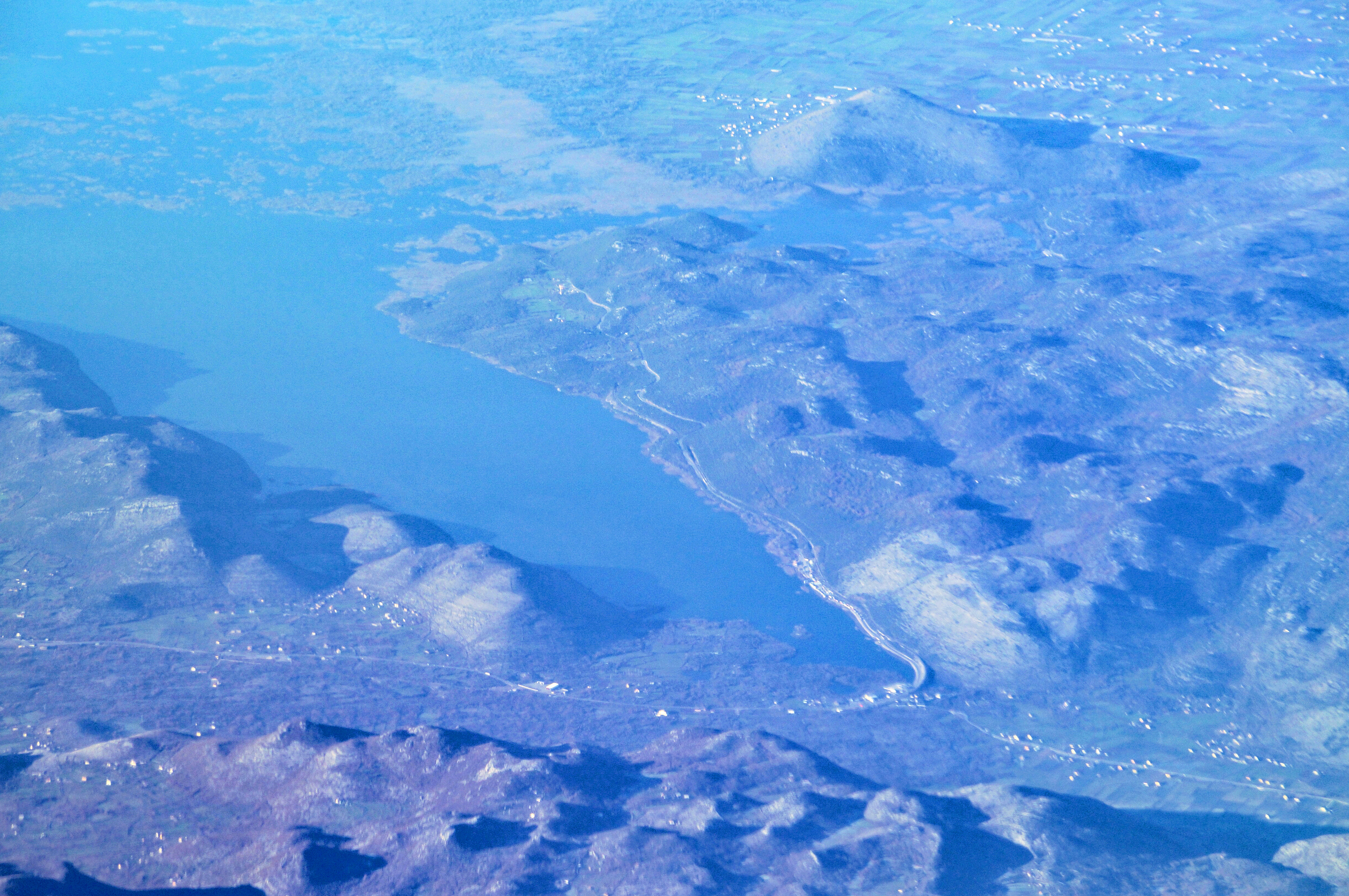
Lake of Hoti in lake Skadar

Between 1353 and 1363, Hoti moved from their area of origin in Plav. A group from Hoti seems to have moved in another location in Plav and some in the location of Limaj, near Peja in Kosovo. In 1414, Hoti already appears to have settled in mountainous pastoral communities in north-eastern Lake Skadar and in 1415 is found in union with the tribes of Tuzi and Bitidossi (Осti, Tusi et Bitidossi). From this period onwards, historical records and details provide a much clearer view on the Hoti tribe, its socio-economic status and its relations with its neighbours. The 1416-1417 Venetian cadastre of Shkodra and the 1485 defter of the Sanjak of Scutari provide particular details on organization and settlement dynamics.

In the cadastre of 1416-1417 the village of Pesiugla is headed by Nikolla Hoti while Andrea Hoti, his sons Andreas and Radash, Mazrrek Hoti & his brothers became pronoiars in the village of Podgora, near modern Koplik. Under Podgora as the head village in the area they also controlled the settlements of Majora, Egreshi, Vajushi, Karokjeta (alt. Feralini), Sordani, and Ljushta. This last settlement was headed by brothers Junk and Vlatik Hoti, who were given full hereditary rights to Ljushta and its property and had to pay yearly rent to Venice for these rights. Another Hoti by the same name appears in Venetian archives in 1434 as Junch Hoth iam dominus in partibus Albaniae and capitaneus montanee Ottorum (captain of the mountains of Hoti).

Andrea Hoti and the whole of the Hoti tribe are registered as becoming ducal citizens of the Venetian Stato da Màr in the cadastre of 1416. Under the act of their fealty to Venice, land properties in Bratosh and Bodishë were given to them in addition to the pronoia in Podgora, which provided the pastoral mountaineers with access to grain and wine. These lands were removed from former Venetian allies who are branded as traitorous in the cadastre. The document also provides for the discharge of penalties against the Hoti tribe that were applicable under Venetian law. These penalties had to do with damage caused by Hoti raids in past times when they were subjects to Lord Balša III. Hoti in return would provide Venetian campaigns with 300 troops, 80 of whom would be light cavalry.

The enmity between Hoti and Balša III existed since at least 1414 when documents show him as requesting from Venice the extradition of two Hoti leaders who harmed his lands even though they were nominally his vassals. The Venetial administration of Scutari considering a possible raid by Hoti in their lands and the prospect of alliance with them did not accept his request. Balša as an act of retaliation against Venice burned down the vineyard village of Kalldrun in December 1415. The latest phase of enmity between Hoti and Balša began after he passed judgment against Hoti in a dispute with the Mataguzi tribe over pasture lands. Despite Balša's support to Mataguži, Hoti took over the disputed lands and Mataguži retaliated by killing four Hoti tribesmen. As Balša III again sided with Mataguži and did not call for punishment for the murders, Hoti switched fealty to Venice in return for their support. As Hoti was only nominally under Balša III in a border region between him and Venice, this influenced the balance of power and was also one of the events that preluded the Second Scutari War two years later. From these events until 1479 when the Ottoman era began in that region, Hoti was allied to Venice.

=== Early Ottoman ===
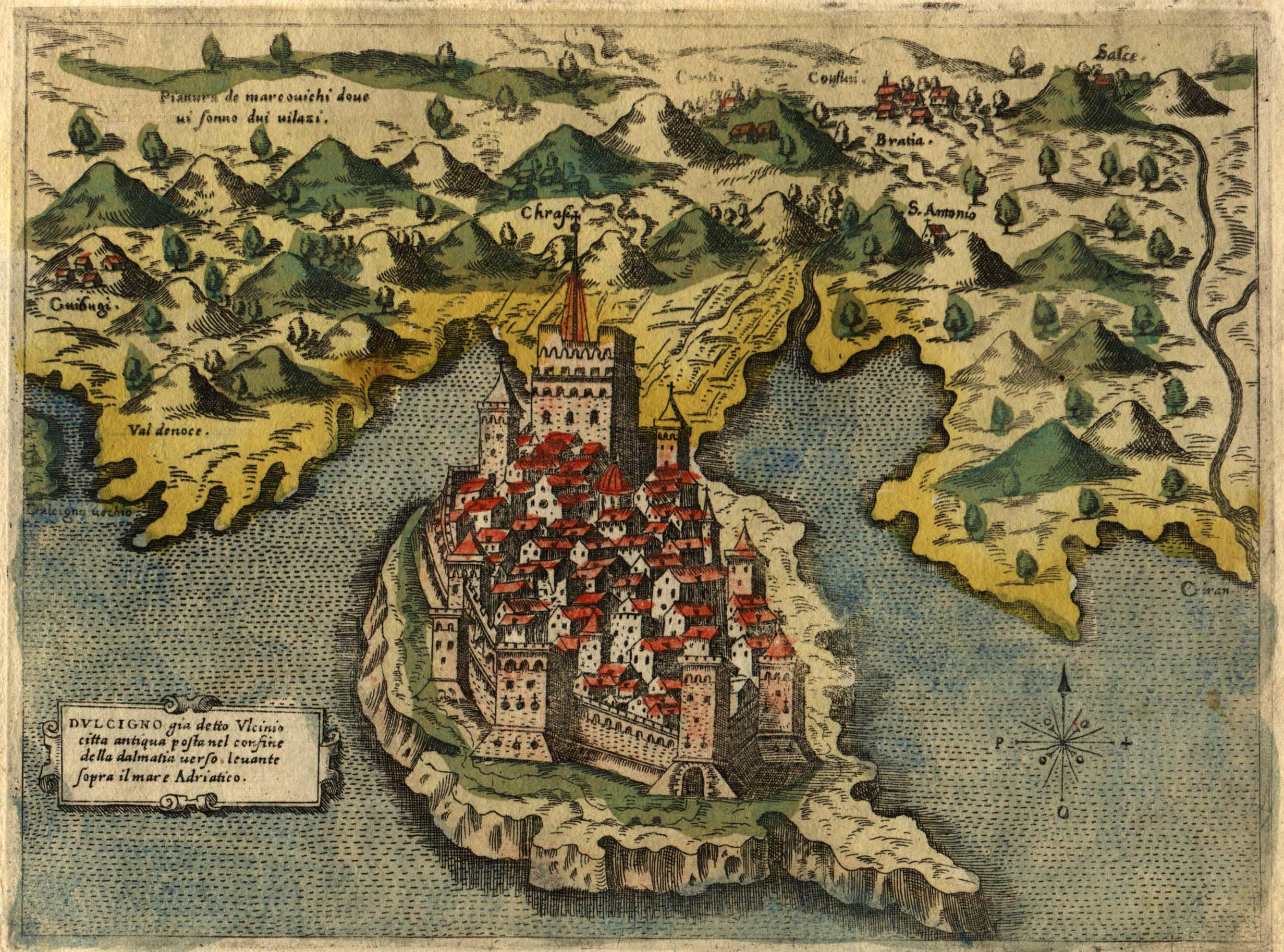
Hoti was crucial in the defense of Ülgün against Venice.

The Ottoman era was followed by the territorial re-organization of the region into the sanjak of Scutari. Hoti was made into the nahiya of the mountains of Hoti, which had 10 settlements (Geg, Tihomir, Mihalina, Ibthosh, Vidagi, Ishbisha, Lubica, Pobrezhan, Bozhan, Oblana) with 195 households in total in the defter of 1485. The actual number of households may be higher as the people from two villages (Ibthosh, Oblana) hid in the mountainous terrain to avoid registration and one village (Ishbisha) appeared to be abandoned altogether. Villages like Podgora that were given as pronoia to Hoti in Venetian times had reverted to their old administrative divisions. One hundred years later in the defter of 1582, some villages would be abandoned and re-appear under other names like Oblana which did not exist anymore in 1582; instead in its place Traboin had emerged.

The defter of 1485 of Scutari also gives crucial information about the relations with the central Ottoman authorities. The tribal structure of communities like Hoti signified underdeveloped feudal relations of property ownership and also the existence of a close-circuit natural economy. In this framework, the resistance of these communities to pay taxes according to the new timar system forced the Ottomans to accept their settlement as communal entities outside the timar registers. Hoti was exempted from the timar system of land allocation in the early Ottoman Empire and no timar holders (timarli sipahi) are found in nahiya of Hoti as communal property organization remained unaffected. Hoti was also exempted from all extraordinary taxes to the new central authorities. Instead they were in the position of florici and paid one ducat (50 akce) per household as in the pre-Ottoman era. The self-governing rights of northern Albanian tribes like Hoti and Kelmendi increased when their status changed from florici to derbendci, a position which required only nominal recognition of central authority. The derbenci position required mountain communities to maintain and protect land routes, throughout the countryside, which connected regional urban centres. In return they were exempted from extraordinary taxes. The Hoti tribe held derbendci status over the passage from Shkodra to the fortresses of Medun and Depeduken in the northern Zeta plain.

From the late 16th century onwards, tribes like Hoti were in a state of semi-autonomy, but also one of occasional conflict with the Ottoman state as it was a Catholic region and tribe in the borderlands, which could be a potential source of tension in the wars of the Ottomans against their Catholic adversaries, Venice and later the Austrian Empire. As Catholics, despite tax exemptions Hoti was also still subject to jizya and this was a further cause of resentment. This was the background for papal missions in the region to boost Catholic ecclesiastical organization against the pressure of islamization. Its military and political counterpart were the meetings of tribes in northern Albania and Montenegro in order to discuss cooperation against the Ottomans under the banner of one of the Catholic powers. One such meeting, the Convention of Kuçi, was held on 15 July 1614 in Kuči, where that tribe, Hoti, Kelmendi and others decided to ask papal aid against the Ottomans as was reported by the patrician of Kotor, Francesco Bolizza. A few months earlier, his brother Mariano Bolizza traveled through the Sanjak of Scutari and compiled a report according to which, Hoti (Hotti) had 212 households and 600 men-in-arms, commanded by Marash Papa (Maras Pappa) and Rrapsha, 80 households and 212 men-in-arms commanded by Prenk Kastrati (Prenc Castrat).

In 1613, the Ottomans launched a campaign against the rebel tribes of Montenegro. In response, the tribes of the Vasojevići, Kuči, Bjelopavlići, Piperi, Kastrati, Kelmendi, Shkreli andi Hoti formed a political and military union known as “The Union of the Mountains” or “The Albanian Mountains” . The leaders swore an oath of besa to resist with all their might any upcoming Ottoman expeditions, thereby protecting their self-government and disallowing the establishment of the authority of the Ottoman Spahis in the northern highlands. Their uprising had a liberating character. With the aim of getting rid of the Ottomans from the Albanian territories

Other assemblies like this one were held from the 1620s to the 1650s, in the culmination of the Cretan War. Such an assembly is reported also in 1658, when the seven tribes of Kuči, Vasojevići, Bratonožići, Piperi, Kelmendi, Hoti and Gruda declared their support for the Republic of Venice, establishing the so-called "Seven-fold barjak" or "alaj-barjak", against the Ottomans. Similar rebellious events continued until the end of hostilities between Venice and the Ottoman. After the war, in 1671, Shtjefën Gaspari as apostolic visitor of the Catholic Church passed through the village of Hot and reported that it had 130 homes and 700 souls. Despite the increase in jizya tax and wars that ravaged the borderlands, Hoti remained Catholic and was organized by the end of the 17th century into two parishes, one in Rrapsha and the other in Traboin, a division that reflected the territorial division of Hoti settlements.

In 1696, Hoti became a bajrak like other tribes in Malësia, northern Albania and Montenegro. Until then the captain of Hoti was recognized by the Ottomans as a voivode, which became nominally the second-in-rank title of Hoti. The status of the bajrak meant that a tribal leader was designated as bajraktar (flag-bearer) by the Ottoman state and was responsible for rallying and leading men-in-arms from the tribe in campaigns of the Ottoman army. The bajraktar of Hoti, who was recognised as the first bajraktar of Malësia, led the forces of tribes (Kelmendi, Shkreli, Kastrati, Gruda and three smaller tribes) in times of war mobilisation. The event which made Hoti a bajrak was the decisive role of the 300 fighters from the tribe in the successful defense of Ülgün (Ulcinj/Ulqin). Luc Gjoni Junçaj, until then voivode, was offered the position of bajraktar on the condition that he converted to Islam. An assembly of all of Hoti, decided that his son Nikë Luca Gjoni (also called Ujk Luca) would convert on the condition that all men of Hoti, who were detained in Anatolia would be released, special taxes would be removed and all men from Malësia would not be conscripted to fight in wars outside of Albanian territory. Thus, Nikë Luca became Mehmet Luca Gjoni, while his brother Vuj Luca remained Catholic. The new brotherhood that was formed as an offshoot of Junçaj, became the only partly Muslim brotherhood of Hoti, the Lucgjonaj. Çun Mula, bajraktar of Hoti in the 19th century, was a direct descendant of Mehmet Luca.

As the conversion was political in nature, the Muslim bajraktars of Hoti kept the traditional religious obligations of the heads of Hoti and took part in the Catholic mass in honour of Saint John the Baptist on August 29 and funded the feast that followed the religious rites. In 1738, Hoti was also given as a hereditary office, the title of the boluk-bashi of Hoti in the sanjak of Scutari. This meant that the Ottoman army representative in the area of Hoti would be from the tribe itself. In the era of the Pashalik of Shkodra, he became the head of these captains of all Malësia and was called bylykbash i pesë maleve (the boluk-bashi of the five mountains).

From the Ottoman perspective, the institution of the bajrak had multiple benefits. Although it recognized a semi-autonomous status in communities like Hoti, it could also be used to stabilize the borderlands as these communities in their new capacity would defend the borders of the empire, as they saw in them the borders of their own territory. Furthermore, the Ottomans considered the office of head bajraktar as a means that in times of rebellion could be used to divide and conquer the tribes by handing out privileges to a select few. On the other hand, autonomy of the borderlands was also a source of conflict as the tribes tried to increase their autonomy and minimize involvement of the Ottoman state. Through a circular series of events of conflict and renegotiation a state of balance was found between Ottoman centralization and tribal autonomy. Hence, the Ottoman era is marked by both continuous conflict and a formalization of socio-economic status within Ottoman administration.

The 18th century also saw the formation of communities that traced their origin to Hoti in the Sandžak region. The Hoti of Sandžak came to that region either from Plav-Gusinje or from Kolašin. After 1730, they formed the first compact communities of Hoti brotherhoods (vllazni) in Tutin in the villages Bujkovići, Špiljani, Crniš, Paljevo, Kovači, Radohovci and in Sjenica in the villages Aliverovići and Raždagina.

In 1614, Mariano Bolizza wrote "Report and description of the Sanjak of Shkodra 1614" to send to his masters in Venice. He noted, "Hoti is commanded by Lord Zaffer Zaus (Xhafer Caushi) and Rezepcceleppi Hazichi (Rexhep Celebi Haseqiu)." In regard to villages of Hoti, he also noted, "30 houses - Tusi (Tuz), commanded by Gie Giecco (Gje Gjeko), 70 men in arms." Additionally, in regard to villages of Roman rite, "212 houses - Hotti (Hoti), commanded by Maras Pappa (Marash Papa), 600 men in arms."

=== Late Ottoman ===
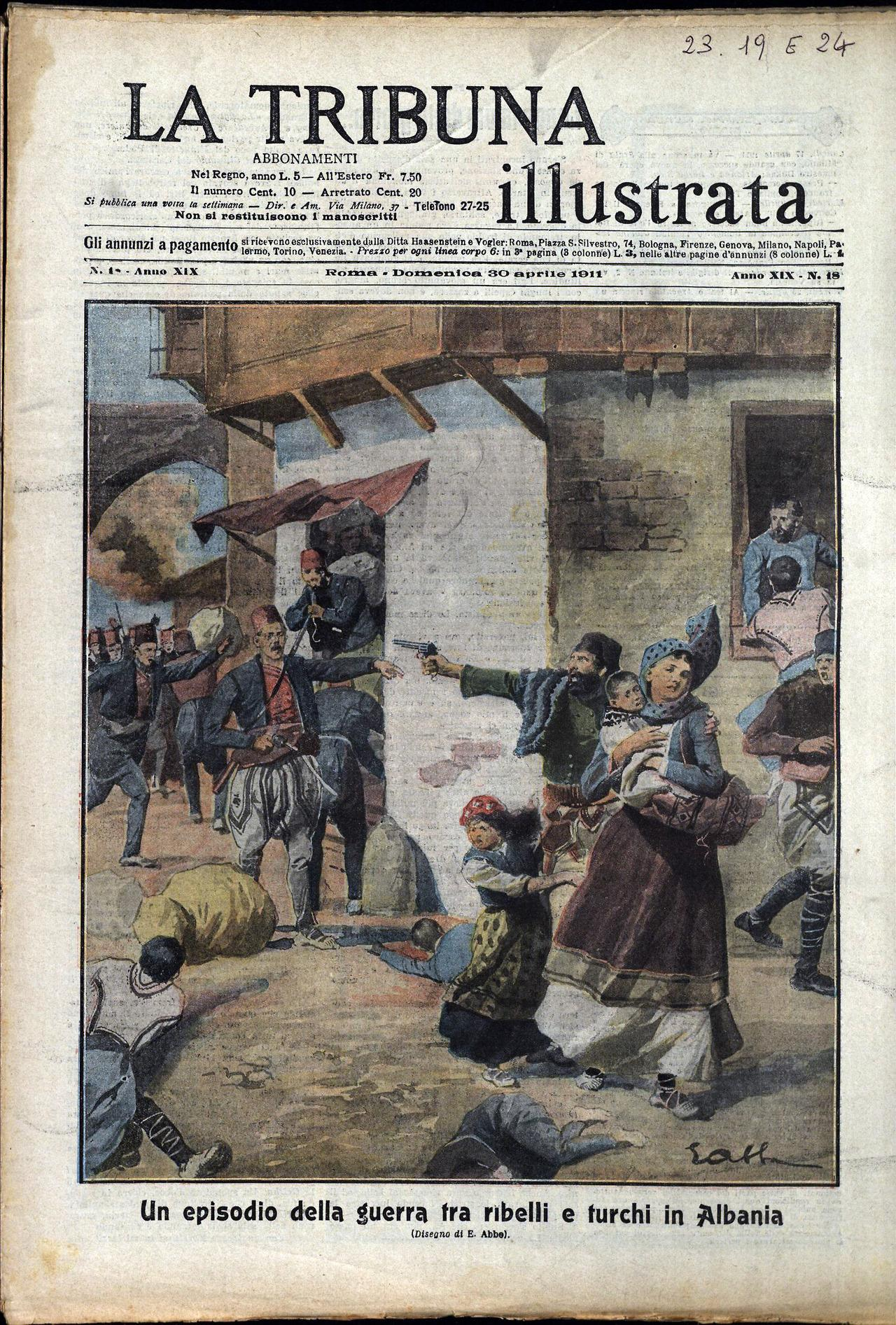
Malësia in the uprising of 1911

The disintegration of the Ottoman Empire in the long 19th century saw the rise of the Balkan states. The establishment of the Principality of Montenegro and its goal of southwards expansion threatened the borderland autonomy of Hoti, which Montenegro sought to bring under its control.

During the early 1860's, members the Hoti ambushed and executed a group of 30 Montenegrin soldiers. They then decapitated them and delivered their heads to Shkodër.

The interests of Great Powers (mainly Russia, Austria-Hungary, Italy) in the region further complicated the situation. These events collectively called "Great Eastern Crisis" led to the Congress of Berlin that was finalized in the Treaty of Berlin. Various scenarios in which highland territory was given to Montenegro were being discussed as the Ottoman Empire and Montenegro were preparing to sign the recognition of Montenegro's independence and enlarged borders. In April 1880, Italy suggested that the Ottoman Empire give Montenegro the Tuz district with its Catholic Gruda and Hoti populations that would have left the tribes split between both countries. The League of Prizren was created to defend Albanian territory from annexation. Hoti was represented in the league by its bajraktar, Çun Mula and Ded Gjo Luli, its foremost military leader. At that time, in the last decades of the 19th century in reports of the era Hoti's population stands at about 4,000 to 4,500 with 400-500 households.

The Ottoman state in order to avoid internal rebellion in the region at the prospect of annexation, erased all debts in the region and redistributed part of the crops that were paid as taxes. The first area that was designated to be ceded was Plav and Gusinje but after the Battle of Novšiće in December 1879, where Montenegro was defeated, the area was excluded. The next area that was being discussed already in September 1879 was that of the upper Cem valley (Triesh and Koja e Kuçit regions), all of Gruda (including Tuzi), a part of Hoti and a part of Vermosh. In relation to Hoti this would have left an additional problem of tensions and instability due to the tribe having precedence by tradition over the other four tribes during peace and war. In January 1880 it was decided that this area would be annexed by Montenegro and the agreement was ratified on April 18, 1880. Preparations were already being made by the highland tribes. In March, Hoti, Gruda, Kelmendi and Kastrati proclaimed that the annexation would be stopped and started gathering forces near the border. The tribes had committed to a besa (pledge) to resist any reduction of their lands and sent telegrams to surrounding regions for military assistance.

On April 22, defensive lines were formed in Tuzi against the Montenegrin annexation that was about to happen the following day. Of the 400 initial defenders of Tuzi, many were from Hoti. In the coming days, this grew to 12,000 as volunteers from the League of Prizren came to the defense line. Of the 6,800 that were in the defensive position of Helm, 500 were from Hoti. These events stopped the annexation of Hoti, although Triesh was handed to Montenegro. The border area remained vague and a conflict zone in the years that followed. In May a new agreement was signed and the main target of Montenegrin annexation became Ulcinj as the plan for Hoti and Gruda failed. To help the defenders of Ulcinj, Hoti and Gruda decided to attack Montenegrin positions and captured Mataguži on July 12, but lost control over it eleven days later. The Ottoman army finally took over Ulcinj and handed it to Montenegro on November 22.

In 1881–2, Hoti and Gruda planned an attack against Montenegro and carried raids past the border with Kuči. The situation was very unstable in the area as the Ottomans tried to re-establish their administration. In May 1883, 3000 highlanders rose in rebellion against the Ottoman state. A new besa (pledge) had been agreed by Hoti, Gruda, Kastrati and Shkreli to stop the delimitation of Ottoman-Montenegrin border. Ottoman front Austria-Hungary intervened for an armistice to be signed. Then, a punitive expedition was carried out in the Hoti, Gruda and Kastrati regions by the Ottomans under Hafiz Pasha on June 10. After gaining control on June 25, the Ottomans razed Hoti. Ded Gjo Luli of Hoti, Smajl Martini of Gruda and Dod Preçi of Kastrati did not surrender and hid in the mountains as fugitives. In a smaller scale, skirmishes and clashes continued well into the 1890s.

The Young Turk Revolution in 1908 and subsequent restoration of the Ottoman constitution provided new hopes for minorities about the upholding of their national rights. Like many other tribes, Hoti made a besa (pledge) to support the constitution and halt blood feuding until November 6, 1908. Despite initial high promises, constitutional rights were never implemented as was hoped and repression towards minorities soon became a central policy of the Young Turks. In Kosovo, hopes rose again with the outbreak of a revolt in 1910, but it was defeated. This was followed by the ban on Albanian education, arrests and exile of Albanian nationalists and a campaign to disarm the highlanders of Malësia. In the meantime, the highland tribes were in communication with Nicholas I of Montenegro, who was willing to allow them to enter Montenegro and provide some cover support against the Ottomans in order to exploit the situation for his own ends.

And so, by the end of 1910, about 2,500 people had found refuge in the area around Podgorica. The Great Powers chose a conciliatory policy and were against a new Albanian revolt. As Nicholas made more and more open statements about annexation under Montenegro and was also called upon by the Great Powers to remain neutral and not risk a general war, the rebels chose to move forwards and start the attack on March 24, 1911. Ded Gjo Luli at the head of 15-20 men of Hoti and 200-300 from Kelmendi captured the Ottoman outpost in Grabom and so began the Highlanders' Revolt. Until 30 March, ten outposts in Hoti, Gruda and Kelmendi fell and on that day the rebels, who numbered a total force of 2,200, got Tuzi. Hoti men were about 400 of the total and were under Ded Gjo Luli, who came to the forefront as the general leader of the revolt. That day a memorandum, which was sent to the embassies of the Great Power in Cetinje was drafted by Ded Gjo Luli, Sokol Baci, Isa Boletini and others. The memorandum put forward the demand for the autonomy and self-government for the Albanian vilayets.

The battles raged on in the line from Dinosha to Deçiq, where the battle that took place in April 6 is the most reported battlefield activity of the revolt. Seven rebels from Koja and thirty Ottomans died in the battle but it became known because after victory was secured, Ded Gjo Luli raised the Albanian standard on the peak of Bratila. The flag hadn't been raised since the 15th century and Skanderbeg's defense against the Ottomans. The phrase Tash o vllazën do t’ju takojë të shihni atë që për 450 vjet se ka pa kush (Now brothers you have earned the right to see that which has been unseen for 450 years) has been attributed to Ded Gjo Luli by later memoirs of those who were present when he raised the flag. The Ottoman response came throughout April and Tuzi was retaken and many villages were burnt by Shevket Turgut Pasha and martial law was declared. On May 14, the Ottomans started a new attack with 10,000 men in the Dinosha-Tuzi-Deçiq line defended by 2,000 highlanders. The defense was surrounded and retreated again towards Podgorica. The Ottomans called for submission and offered amnesty and a large monetary compensation for any leader who surrendered, but this was refused. Meanwhile, the uprising had gotten international coverage and groups of volunteers were being organized to come in the region to fight.

As new fighting broke out, on 23 June 1911, the leaders of the uprising and other Albanian revolutionaries gathered near Selcë in Kelmend and drafted the Greçë Memorandum demanding Albanian socio-political and linguistic rights. Hoti's representation included Ded Gjo Luli and Gjeto Marku and its three parish priests, Karl Prenushi (Vuksanlekaj), Sebastian Hila (Rrapsha) and Luigj Bushati (Traboin). The memorandum was refused, but a negotiation process began, which led to an eventual agreement which included general amnesty, the recognition of the right to Albanian education and the right to bear arms. In the nahiye of Hoti, this meant that for the first time the Ottoman government pledged to open and fund a primary school in Albanian. Schooling in Albanian until then was either offered by the priests and monks of the Catholic Church or in one of the Albanian schools that Austria-Hungary funded under the cultural protectorate over the Ottoman Empire's Catholics. The beginning of the Balkan Wars left much of the agreement unimplemented.

=== Modern ===
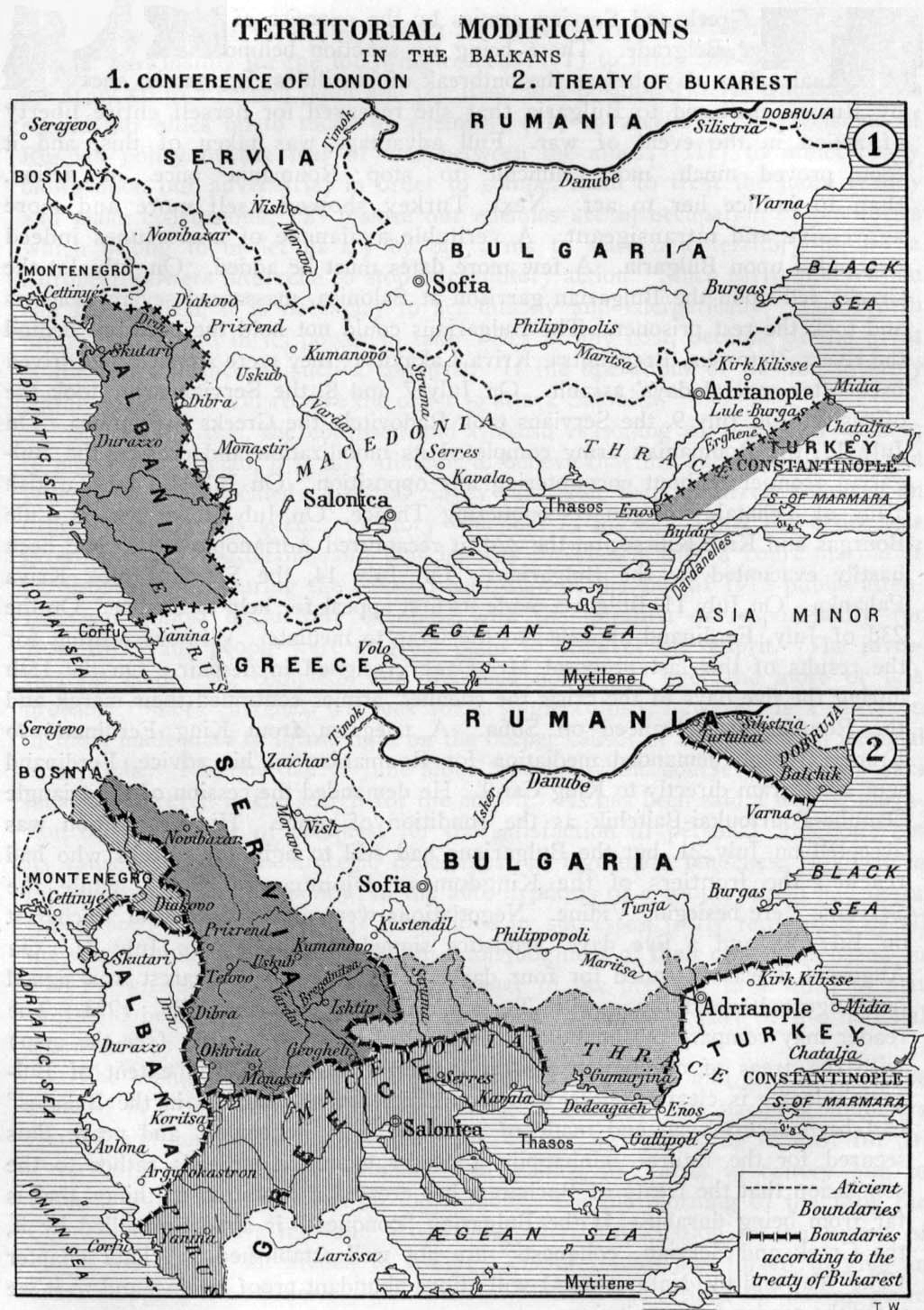
By the treaty of London, Hoti was included in the borders of Albania and by the treaty of Bucharest of a few months later, it was divided between Albania and Montenegro.

In the Balkan Wars, northern Albanian territories came under a combined Serbo-Montenegrin attack. The five-month Siege of Scutari was the focal point of the campaign. The city was surrendered after an agreement by Essad Pasha Toptani and Nicholas I, but the Montenegrin army had suffered 15,000 losses. The long resistance also meant that Montenegrin claims in the region were hampered. The final status of the city was to remain in the new Albanian state in the ensuing treaty of London in May 1913. By the terms of the treaty, Hoti was to remain entirely within Albania. In June, the second Balkan war broke out. With the defeat of Bulgaria, the victors, including Montenegro, increased their borders and more than half of Hoti was given to Montenegro, as was all of Gruda by the terms of the treaty of Bucharest in August 1913. Still, the region remained in turmoil and Montenegrin actual control was not established as clashes broke out in the borderlands. Then, the Serbian army intervened and occupied the area. After further intervention from the Austro-Hungarian Empire, the Serbian army withdrew. In the process, massacres of hundreds of people took place. In January 1916, with the surrender of Montenegro to Austria-Hungary in WWI, Hoti came under Austro-Hungarian military and civilian administration until 1918.

In the Paris Peace Conference of 1919, the Albanian delegation at first headed by Turhan Pasha and then Luigj Bumçi presented their case for Hoti and other territories to be returned to Albania, but borders remained unchanged. Under the new treaties, the Serbian army entered Hoti, Gruda and the northern highlands that were given to Montenegro in the treaty of Bucharest, now as part of the Kingdom of Serbs, Croats and Slovenes. On December 25, 1919, the Serbian army carried an operation under which it arrested and executed in Hoti at least 72 men. This event was commemorated 100 years later and a monument in the village Hoti was erected by the descendants of the victims in an event jointly attended by representatives of the municipalities of Malësi e Madhe in Albania and Tuzi in Montenegro. One of the descendants of those killed is Gjon Junçaj, Albanian-American prosecutor and US envoy to Albania.

The interwar period was marked by more refugees crossing the border and settling in Albania. They were given arable land and settled in villages that bore the name of their homeland. Thus, Hoti i Ri (New Hoti) was settled in 1932 by families of refugees that came from Traboin. In the now Yugoslav part of Hoti, the political situation was tense and unstable. Albania itself was falling under Italy's sphere of influence and Italy was presenting itself as the champion of Albanian national rights. In this political context, documents from the British Foreign Office describe a situation where, from Hoti and Grude in what used to be Montenegro, right along the Yugoslav frontier down to Dibra and Ochrida, no inconsiderable area and population await the crusade of an Albanian or Italian Liberator..

Yugoslavia's capitulation to Germany in WWII led to a reshaping of borders and Hoti became a part of Albania under Italian and later German hegemony in 1941–4 to win support for the Axis among Albanians. In 1945, the Yugoslav Partisans got control of Hoti and Gruda again. December 15 is the official date for the state celebration of the "day of liberation" of Tuzi. After 1948, the border between Albania and Yugoslavia closed and became heavily militarized. Border regions like Hoti suffered in particular as family members became isolated from one another. In the 1990s, the collapse of the economy led to heavy migration throughout Hoti, Gruda and the northern highlands as was happening throughout the Balkans.

== In Literature ==
=== The Highland Lute by Gjergj Fishta ===
In the English Translation (Robert Elsie, Janice Mathie-Heck) of the Albanian National Epic "The Highland Lute" by Gjergj Fishta, the Hoti Tribe, as well as other northern tribes, is mentioned frequently.

The glossary entry for Hoti is written as:

"Northern Albanian tribe and traditional tribal region. The Hoti region is situated in the District of Malesia e Madhe along the road from the Albanian-Montenegrin border-crossing Han i Hotit ('The Inn of Hoti') and Bajza, up the valley to the northeast to Rapsh-Starja, leading towards Vermosh. It borders on the traditional tribal regions of Gruda to the north, Kelmendi to the northeast, and Kastrati to the south. the name Hoti was recorded in 1330. In 1474, the region was mentioned as montanee octorum, montanea ottanorum (Mountain of the Hotis). The Hoti tribe, traditionally Catholic, had a population of about 4,000 in 1842. The Hotis were well respected among the other tribes and had the right to march first into battle. The Great Powers decided that the lands of Hoti and Gruda were to be handed over to Montenegro on 22 April 1880. Ottoman forces withdrew from the region on 22 April, but advancing Montenegrin troops were met with fierce resistance from the Albanian forces of the League of Prizren, in particular at the Bridge of Rrzhanica, as commemorated in Canto 14.

== Traditions ==
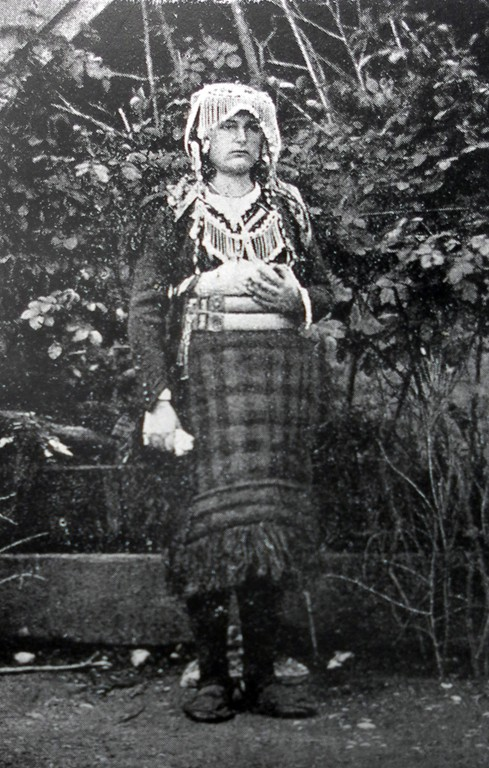
Traditional female dress of Hoti, 1908

Hoti is almost entirely Catholic. Its oldest church is in ruins and dates to around 1500. Hoti was divided in two parishes: one in Rrapshë and the other in Traboin. The church of Rrapshë is the locality of Brigje (kisha e Brigjes). Francesco Bolizza recorded in 1616 when he was writing a report about the region. Pjetër Bogdani in 1672 notes that in Brigje besides the church, there was also a school in function. Rrapshë first became a parish in 1699, when the Franciscan Order settled in Hoti. One of the many franciscans, who served in the church of Brigje was Fra Gjergj Fishta in 1902.

The parish and church of Traboin first date to 1648, but the church was later ruined and rebuilt. In 1696, Hoti gained bajrak status and other rights on the condition that one of its leaders converts to Islam. From that point, the bajraktar of Hoti is Muslim and those families that today are Muslim descend from this original conversion. Thus, in the late Ottoman period, the tribe of Hoti consisted of 500 Catholic households and 23 Muslim that included the family of the bajraktar. This conversion did not affect relations within the community as although Muslim, the bajraktar followed the traditions of the tribe. He annually funded the feast of St. John the Baptist (Albanian: Shën Gjoni or Shnjoni), the patron saint of Hoti, and observed mass on that day.

The funerary customs of Hoti as those of Malësia in general include the lamentation (gjâmë) of the deceased in a collective manner by a group of men (gjamatarë).

== Brotherhoods ==
All families (barqe) of Hoti belong to brotherhoods who are descended from the four sons of Geg Lazër Keqi: Pjetër, Junç, Gjon, Lajç. In addition to using the names of brotherhoods or that of the oldest known ancestor as surnames, individual families may also have a patronymic surname taken from a more recent ancestor or the village of origin. From Pjetër Gega, founder of Traboin, trace their descent: Gjelaj, Gojçaj, Dedvukaj, Nicaj, Lekvukaj, Camaj, Gjokë-Camaj, Dushaj, Dakaj. The descendants of Pjetër Gega also use Traboini as a surname.

From Junç Gega trace their descent: Lucgjonaj (the bajraktars of Hoti from whom the Çunmulaj descend), Frangaj, Dojanaj, Palaj, Çekaj, Gegaj, Prekaj. All the brotherhoods also use Junçaj as a surname. From Gjon Gega trace their descent: Gjonaj, Hasanaj, Martinaj, Gjoknikaj, Vatnikaj, Haxh(i)aj. From Lajç Gega trace their descent: Smajlaj, Gjerkaj, Dekaj, Dreshaj. All the brotherhoods also use Lajçaj as a surname. Llesh P. Smajlaj, a local folklorist in his collected works (2012) writes that up to the mid 20th century the Locaj brotherhood, two families descended from the brothers Dakë and Cak Hasani and two families descended from Martin Peci were Anas.

Many people from Hoti have emigrated to the US since the 1960s. In the 2010 US census, surnames which are almost exclusively related to Hoti that appear more than 100 times rank as follows:

Surname	Count
Camaj/Camović	659
Gojçaj/Gojčić	604
Junçaj/Junčić	563
Dedvukaj/Dedvuković	378
Pervizaj/Pervizić	543
Hoti/Hotić	242

The brotherhoods from Hoti that don't live in the Hoti region or have settlements in other areas are part of the Hoti farefisni. They are divided into brotherhoods according to their progenitors in their settlements.

Settlement	Brotherhoods
Hoti (in Plav municipality	Mehaj/Mehić, Hysenaj/Huseinović, Haxhaj/Hadžić, Sinanaj/Sinanovlć, Mujaj/Mujović

== Notable people ==
- Junç Hoti (1434), capitaneus montanee Ottorum (captain of the mountains of Hoti)
- Çun Mula Lucgjonaj (1818-1896), flag-bearer (bajraktar)
- Ded Gjo Luli Dedvukaj (1840-1915), military leader and commander of the Malësori in the Battle of Deçiq
- Nora of Hoti, independence fighter
- Ukshin Hoti (1943–1999), philosopher
- Musa Hoti (1946–2004), activist
- Emina Çunmulaj, model
- Mark Lucgjonaj (born 1986), author
- Ilir Hoti, economist
- Fortesa Hoti, actress
- Aljbino Camaj (born 1979), footballer
- Driton Camaj (born 1997), footballer
- Martin Camaj (1925–1992), folklorist, linguist, and writer
- Jurgen Vatnikaj, footballer
- Afërdita Dreshaj, Miss Kosovo
- Avdullah Hoti (born 4 February 1976) is a Kosovan politician, who served as the prime minister of Kosovo from 3 June 2020 until 22 March 2021
- Ibrahim Drešević, footballer
- Florent Hoti, footballer
- Shemsi Pasha, Ottoman Albanian general
- Pashko Camaj, professor at William Paterson University
- Nikollë Camaj, politician and currently Deputy Chairman of the Montenegrin Parliament
- Engjëll Hoti (born 26 February 1997) is a Kosovan professional footballer who plays as a midfielder.
- Renato Hoti (born 24 February 1985) was an Albanian professional footballer and coach.
