= Haxhi Zeka =

Albanian nationalist leader

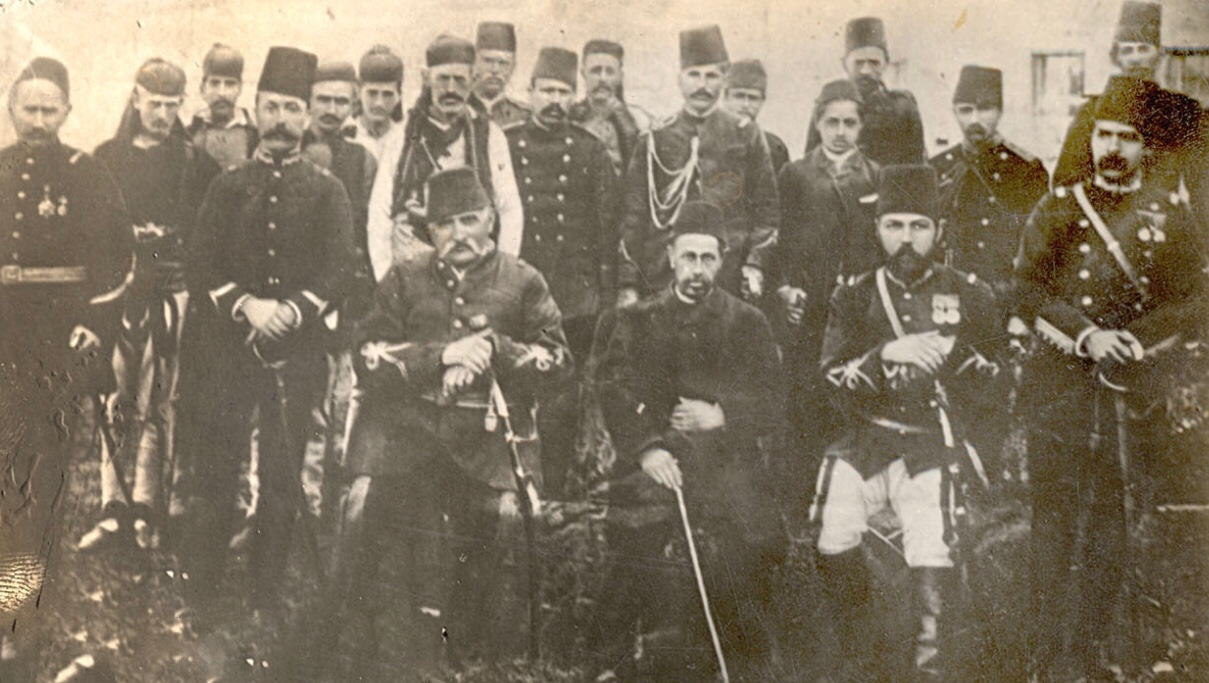
- Picture of Haxhi Zeka (sitting in the middle) with Ali Pasha of Gucia (sitting, first from the left) with some other members of Prizren League
- Born: Haxhi Zejneli; December 20, 1832; Shoshan, Tropojë, Albania, past Ottoman Empire (now Shoshani, Tropojë, Albania)
- Died: February 21, 1902 (aged 69)
- Occupations: Teacher then commander and leader
- Years active: 1880-1902
- Known for: Fighting Montenegrin forces in Plava and Gucia
- Notable work: Cooperated closely with Ali Pashe of Gucia

Haxhi Zekë Byberi mostly known as Haxhi Zeka (Turkish: Haci Zeka; 20 December 1832 – 21 February 1902) was an Albanian nationalist leader, a member of the League of Prizren, while in 1899 he was part of the establishment and leadership of the League of Peja, another organization seeking protection of Albanians territories from Balkan states. Zeka was assassinated in 1902.

== Biography ==
Zeka was born on 20 December 1832 in the village of Shoshani (in the Highlands of Gjakova), from where his family moved to Peja, in the Kosovo Vilayet. He was a landowner and had a reputation for being charismatic. Zeka was one of the organizers of the League of Prizren and one of the determined fighters for Albania's autonomy and protection of the integrity of its territory. The Assembly of the first League was held on June 10, 1878, where he was elected member of its Central Committee. He was a military commander, in charge of the forces of the League in action in Gjakova in September 1878 against Mehmet Ali Pasha. Besides other political and military leaders the league struggled in late 1879 and early 1880 for the protection of Plav and Gusinje against the forces of Montenegro. In the spring of 1881 he fought with Sulejman Vokshi and took part in battles against the army of Dervish Pasha. During 1892-1893 Zeka led an uprising against local Ottoman authorities.

In 1884-85, together with Vokshi and Kadri Bajri, Zeka led anti-Ottoman uprisings, in order to create autonomy. In 1893, Haxhi Zeka and Bajram Curri organized the uprisings in Peja, Gjakova and other regions of Kosovo against the political and economic injustices of the Ottoman Empire. For his patriotic activities in 1893, he was summoned to Istanbul where he was held under arrest until 1896 by the orders of Sultan Abdul Hamid II.

In 1896-1900 he was put in charge of the Albanian rebellion for autonomy and protection of the territorial integrity of the country.

He led a people's armed resistance that began in Kosovo in 1897 and founded the Albanian Covenant (1897). In cooperation with the Albanian Committee of Istanbul headed by Sami Frashëri and other patriots at home and abroad, Haxhi Zeka organized a meeting known as the Assembly of Peja of Albanian notables between 23–29 January 1899. The gathering was a response to increasing foreign influence in the region and was attended by some 450 Kosovo Albanians in Pejë. On 28 January 1899 an agreement was reached by the delegates on forming the League of Peja (Besa-Besë) and on 29 January swore a pledge (besë), suspended blood feuds in the region and elected Zeka as chairman of its Committee. In April–May 1899 he was prepared to call another General Assembly of the Albanian League, whose keeping was hampered by the Sublime Porte. Zeka and the League committee would appeal to all parts of Albanian inhabited territory in the empire for assistance and meetings in some towns occurred that expressed solidarity with the movement. Regardless of Istanbul's objections and obstacles of the Great Powers of neighbouring irredentist states, Haxhi Zeka continued his efforts to strengthen the League throughout the year 1900 until its suppression by the Ottoman army. His activities continued especially after April 1901 holding meetings in northern parts of the vilayet of Kosovo aiming to unite Albanians toward resisting the Ottomans and other outside adversaries. Zeka reached out to Austria-Hungary offering his services and advocated for a union between Albania and them, however they distrusted him due to his closeness with the Ottoman sultan's entourage.

On February 21, 1902 Haxhi Zeka was assassinated in Peja by Adem Zajmi, which had the support of the Ottoman authorities.

== Legacy ==
=== Haxhi Zeka mill ===
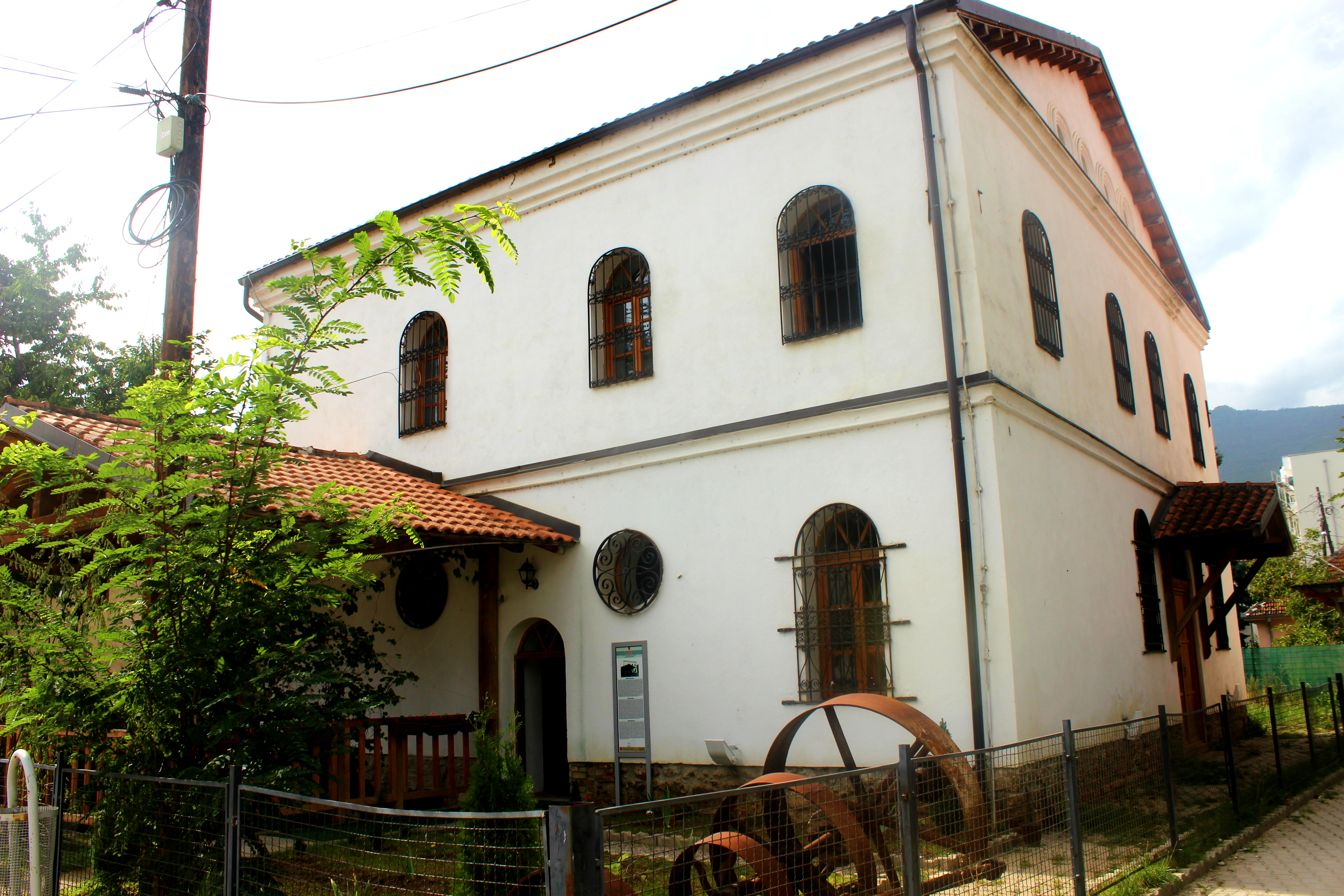
Haxhi Zeka mill

Haxhi Zeka Mill is a large complex of industrial heritage which belongs to the second half of the 19th century. It was built with the help of the Austro-Hungarians. The building consists of a mill and a granary. At the time in which it was built, it was the tallest building in Peja consisting of three floors. The façade combines stone and brick and it has arched windows and frames. The Haxhi Zeka Mill was the first mill in Kosovo and the region which had the most advanced technology brought in from Austria. The mill initially used water for its power source, then it used electricity. The building represented the start of an industrial-based economy in Peja. Prior to that, the whole region has performed services for grinding grain and flour production.

After the death of Haxhi Zeka, Yasar Pasha, his nephew, became manager of the mill. In 1997 it was placed under state control. During the 1998-1999 war, the mill was burned but it was restored: the mill was restored in 2004 with the granary restored in 2016.

=== Public University "Haxhi Zeka" ===
Public University "Haxhi Zeka" in the establishment is a descendant of the Faculty of Applied Business (FSHAB) in Peja was established in 1960 by decision of the Executive Board of KSAK as the High School of Commerce - Commercial Peja. The school was renamed as Business School and then at the Faculty of Applied Sciences and Business. Initially the school had only section of the Commercial Business in Enterprise and a small number of teachers. In the first academic year 1960/61, 120 students were enrolled.

Since 2007 FSHAB studies develop in three departments:

- Business Administration in two languages (Albanian and Bosnian)
- Business Accounting and Finance and
- Management, Tourism and hospitality industry.

Also, the university provides opportunities for academic preparation master of science.

=== Haxhi Zeka square ===
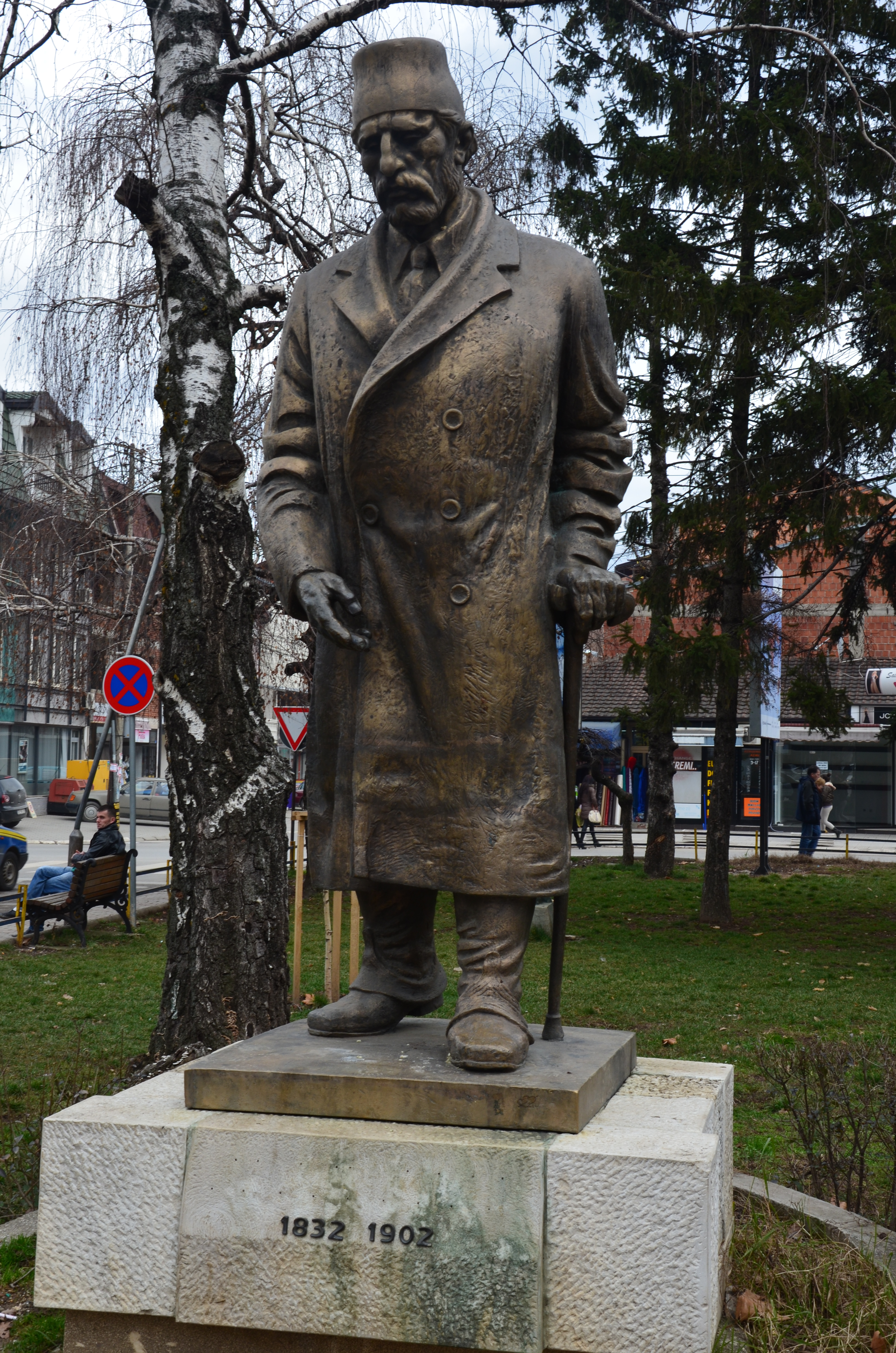
Haxhi Zeka statue

In the centre of the city of Peja lies Haxhi Zeka square. In this square are important objects including Tahir Bey Konak, the National Ethnographic Museum where can be seen various galleries, traditional national crafts, characteristic clothing of Rugova and Dukagjini, Trade Center "Metë Bajraktari" etc. In the center of the square is the fountain which was built in the 16th century, close to the statue of Haxhi Zeka.

=== Tower of Haxhi Zeka ===
Near the Haxhi Zeka square is found Tower of Pasha or also known as Tower of Haxhi Zeka, whose walls are made with characteristic works of Albanian masters of that time as the lion, the star of David, etc. It has a characteristic architecture of the eighteenth and nineteenth century, built of stone and it has windows worked with commitment by the Albanian masters.

=== In his honor ===
The public university of Peja, the successor of the Faculty of Applied Business Sciences, bears the name "Haxhi Zeka" University.

Additionally, a square has been named after him, at the center of the square stands a fountain built in the 16th century, near which the statue of Haxhi Zeka is also located.
