= Paljevo (Tutin) =

- Village (Selo)
- Location within Serbia
- Coordinates: 43°00′N 20°23′E
- Country: Serbia
- District: Raška District
- Municipality: Tutin

Population (2002)
  - Total: 369
- Time zone: UTC+1 (CET)
  - Summer (DST): UTC+2 (CEST)

Paljevo is a village in the municipality of Tutin, Serbia. According to the 2002 census, the village has a population of 369 people.

== History ==
The inhabitants of Crniš, Paljevo and Dubovo stem from the Hoti fis which settled in the area in the late 17th/early 18th century.

Today, almost all villagers identify themselves as Bosniaks (2002 census).
