= Camaj =

Camaj is an Albanian surname. Notable people with the name include:

- Aljbino Camaj (born 1979), Malsor Footballer
- Andrej Camaj (born 2006), Montenegrin footballer
- Driton Camaj (born 1997), Malsor professional footballer
- Ilir Camaj (born 1996), Montenegrin footballer
- Martin Camaj (1925–1992), Malsor folklorist, linguist and writer
- Nikolla Camaj (born 1960), Montenegrin politician and educator
- Roko Camaj (1941–2001), casualty of September 11th attacks
