= Baca Kurti =

Albanian military leader (died 1881)

Coordinates: 42°24′N 19°20′E

Baca Kurti Gjokaj
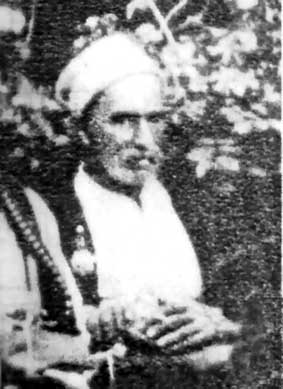
- Born: Baca Kurti Gjokaj c. 1807; Milesh, Ottoman Empire (present-day Montenegro)
- Died: 1881; Milesh, Ottoman Empire, (present-day Montenegro)
- Cause of death: Poisoned
- Resting place: Saint Michel's graveyard Dinoša, Montenegro
- Occupation: Clan chief
- Organization: League of Prizren
- Title: Chief of the Gruda clan

Baca Kurti Gjokaj (c. 1807–1881) was an Albanian leader who participated in the Battle of Ržanica against the Principality of Montenegro.

== Life ==
Baca was born around 1807 in the village of Milješ (Milesh) in the Gruda tribal region near the town of Tuzi, to an Albanian highlander (Malësor) family. Kurti was born and adhered to Roman Catholicism. In 1856, he became voivode of Gruda after putting down a band of rebels in Fundna. He also killed the brother of Marko Miljanov that year.

He was one of 15 Ottoman delegates from northern Albania sent during the talks of the Congress of Berlin (13 June–13 July 1878). Apart from three guards from Mirditë, of the Catholic delegates included chiefs Çun Mula from Hoti, Baca Kurti from Gruda, Marash Dashi from Shkreli, Cil Vuksani from Kastrati, Mark Lula from Shala, Mark Kola from Shosha and Con Geda from Shllaku.

He joined the Albanian nationalist League of Prizren after the decision of the Congress of Berlin to hand over the Albanian-inhabited regions of Hoti, Gruda, Plav, Gusinje, Kastrati, etc. to the Principality of Montenegro. When Prince Nicholas I of Montenegro entered the territory which had been ceded to him by the Congress of Berlin, Baca Kurti and other chiefs of Malësia organized a resistance against Montenegro. The northern Albanian highlanders defeated the Montenegrins in the Battle of Ržanica. He was distinguished as one of the best commanders of Çun Mula during the battle.

Vëllazën, anmiku po na mësyen! Kush don me dekë sot për vend të vet dhe për nder të armëve të veta, të vinë pas meje!
("Brothers, the enemy is coming after us! whoever wants to die today for their own country and for the honor of their armor, shall follow me")

— Baca Kurti, during the Battle of Ržanica

He mobilized not only the members of his clan but also the members of other towns of Malësia, to fight against the Montenegrin army and to have the Montenegrins leave Albanian territory: all males from 7 to 70 years old, united, forced the Montenegrin forces to retire. Today he is known to Albanians worldwide as many songs and poems were created in his honor.

== Annotations ==
1. His full name was Baca Kurt Gjeka or Gjokaj. In Serbian, his name is spelled Baca-Kurti (Баца-Курти), and Baca Kurta (Баца Курта).
