= Nikolla Camaj =

Montenegrin politician (born 1960)

- Born: 4 December, 1960; Podgorica, Montenegro
- Education: University of Prishtina
- Occupation: Vice President - Parliament of Montenegro
- Website: https://www.skupstina.me/en/members/nikola-camaj

Nikolla Camaj (born December 4, 1960..) is a Montenegrin politician and educator, currently serving as the Vice-President of the Parliament of Montenegro.

== Early life and education ==
Camaj was born in Podgorica, Montenegro. He completed his primary and secondary education in Tuzi. He obtained a degree from the Faculty of Albanian Literature and Language at the University of Prishtina. Subsequently, he pursued postgraduate studies at the Faculty of Philosophy, University of Zagreb, and is currently engaged in doctoral studies in Anthropology. His professional development includes specialized training at the School of Democratic Leadership (Podgorica, Lillehammer, Strasbourg, Brussels), the Diplomatic Academy of the Government of Montenegro (Podgorica), and the Freedom House Fellowship Program (USA, Washington, Sacramento)

== Career ==
Camaj’s professional career commenced in the education sector, where he served as a secondary school teacher in Tuzi from 1987 to 1997 and again from 2010 to 2019. His public service roles include Assistant Secretary for Information (1998-2002), with responsibilities concerning the development of Albanian-language media. From 2002 to 2006, he worked with ORT/USAID, focusing on the development of the NGO sector in Montenegro. He served as Head of the Tuzi Local Assembly from 2006 to 2010, and as Director of Utility Services in Tuzi from 2019 to 2023. Since 2023, he has been a member of the Parliament of Montenegro, currently holding the position of Vice-President. His international parliamentary engagement includes membership in the NATO Parliamentary Assembly and the Parliamentary Assembly of the Council of Europe (PACE). He also engages in journalism and translation.

== Political activity and international engagement ==
Camaj is active in Montenegrin politics, with a focus on minority rights and local governance. His advocacy includes the decentralization of the Tuzi municipality and participation in discussions related to Montenegrin independence. He is affiliated with the Albanian Forum political group. His participation in the NATO Parliamentary Assembly and PACE demonstrates his involvement in international political forums.
