= Çun Mula =

Albanian freedom fighter and Hoti bajraktar

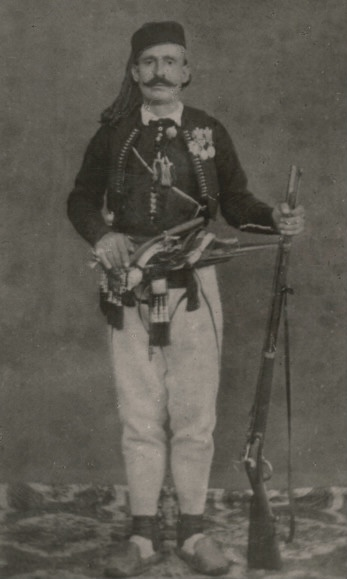
- Born: c. 1818; Hoti, Sanjak of Scutari, Ottoman Empire
- Died: 1896
- Occupations: Tribal leader and rebel
- Years active: 1878–1896
- Known for: Bajraktar of the Hoti tribe
- Notable work: Victorious in the Battle of Ržanica

Çun Mula (c. 1818–1896) was the bajraktar ("flag-bearer") of the Hoti tribe (today divided between Montenegro and Albania) and an Albanian freedom fighter. His family, the Lucgjonaj, descended from the Junçaj family of Hoti. According to the Code of Lekë Dukagjini, Çun Mula's family was put in charge of the Malësia tribes, leading them bravely and faithfully in the many wars against Montenegrin and Ottoman forces.

== Congress of Berlin and League of Prizren ==
He was one of 15 Albanian delegates from northern Albania sent during the talks of the Congress of Berlin (13 June–13 July 1878) apart from three guards from Mirditë. The Catholic delegates included the chiefs of Çun Mula from Hoti, Baca Kurti from Gruda, Marash Dashi from Shkreli, Cil Vuksani from Kastrati, Mark Lula from Shala, Mark Kola from Shosha and Con Geda from Shllaku.

He was appointed as the commander of voluntary resistance forces at the Albanian nationalist League of Prizren after the decision of the Congress of Berlin to hand over the Albanian-inhabited regions of Hoti, Gruda, Plav, Gusinje, Kastrati, etc. to the Principality of Montenegro. When Prince Nicholas I of Montenegro entered the territory which had been ceded to him by the Congress of Berlin,Cun Mula and other chiefs of Malësia organized a resistance against Montenegro. The northern Albanian highlanders defeated the Montenegrins in the Battle of Ržanica. He is enumerated in Albanian highlander epic poetry.

== Military activity ==
Different kind of evidence shows that Cun Mula participated as a soldier of the Ottoman Empire in the Crimean War and Morea. Given the big name that created Cun Mula in that country, in 1878 the chiefs of Hoti and Great Highland elected him as its representative in the Assembly of the League of Prizren, which was held on the tenth June of that year under the chairmanship of Iljaz Pashë Dibrës (from the Qoku family). In this assembly, Cun Mula was assigned the post of Commander of the volunteer military forces across the borders. One of the biggest battles that led Cun Mula, where he was distinguished for courage and bravery, was the Battle of Zharnica, where the highlands volunteers defeated the Montenegrin "Keqasi" military forces under King Nicholas of Montenegro. Likewise, several years later, Cun Mula also fought back against the military forces of the Ottoman Empire, when they gave Hoti, Gruda, Plav and Gusinje to Montenegro. One of the most popular battles Cun Mula held against the Turkish forces, in Bajze, Kastrat, was against the forces of Bedri Pasha. During that battle Cun Mula asked for Capitain Sokol Beg Hodo who was the military commander based in northern Albania in Shkodra and he supplied them with weapons and numerous volunteers. Cun Mula gathered these forces in Postriba, Shkrel and Kastrat. It is said that the commander of Turkish forces Bedri Pasha, seeing the impossible clash with highlands led by the Bajraktars of Hoti, who were determined to fight with anyone to protect their homeland, avoided conflicts and opened the way for Cun Mula. This event became very popular in the epic songs of Albanian Folklore. They were described immortal when being sung with the "Lahuta" for several generations.

Besides his activity as a military leader in charge of highlanders, Cun Mula Bajraktari Hoti was known and respected as the wise man or conciliation in various judiciaries sharing not only in his province and beyond. Likewise Cun Mula is also known for his contribution to reconciliation between the chiefs of Lezha and Bajraktars of Mirdita in their constant fighting over domination between the two provinces. At that time they quarreled between the two provinces and reached an agreement with the commander of Mirdita John Markagjoni, with the consent of the tribal chieftains in Lezha. They called upon Cun Mula, who awarded the borders and both parties satisfied. It is also said that those borders still remain as boundaries separating two regions of Lezha and Mirdita who then had ongoing problems with each other.

== Death ==
Cun Mula died in 1896 at the age of 76 and was buried with great honors in the lands of his ancestors in the province of Hoti. After his death his tribe found out that his nephew was Deli Meta, who was born in 1857. As the first of his family and Deli Meta spent most of life in wars against Serbian-Montenegrin forces. From multiple oral testimonies Deli Meta reportedly became the terror of Serbo-Montenegrins from the bravery he showed in the Battle of Qytezës in Nën-Helmësi of Grabanicit. Deli Meta also fought in Koplik in 1912 against Serbian-Montenegrin forces which wanted to annex Shkoder to Montenegro. In these fights Meta Deli also fought alongside his son Mul Bajraktari, and Luc Nishi who was from the tribe of Dede John Luli. After that battle, in revenge, the Montenegrin forces burned down his house three times. King Nicholas of Montenegro with King Alexander tried to bribe and trick him to a solution in exchange of money and power but it was rejected by the Bajraktars of Hoti and the Great Highlands. After Serbia and Montenegro annexed half of the province of Hoti, Gruda and Tuzi, King Nicholas of Montenegro sent his minister of Foreign Affairs to persuade Deli Meta and the nobles Hoti to sign a declaration of agreements with Montenegrin. King Nicholas also again sent a large sum of money in order to persuade Meta Deli and the Hotis but it was rejected in disgust. It is said that during a speech in the Palace of King Nicholas where the king had invited the most prominent officers of Montenegro, the King asked them who the most dangerous Albanian was. After many responses King Nicholas came to present saying: "I know two Albanians I fear: The Bajraktar of Hoti Deli Meta, who is a Muslim and who governs a Catholic province and the Bajraktar of Gruda who is Catholic and governs a Muslim province. In the case of war they are always united."

== Legacy ==
His descendants in the Albanian-inhabited regions of Montenegro are known by the surname Çunmulaj.

=== Annotations ===
1. In Serbian his name is spelled Čun Mula (Чун Мула) and Čul-Mula (Чул-Мула).
