= Kadri Bajri =

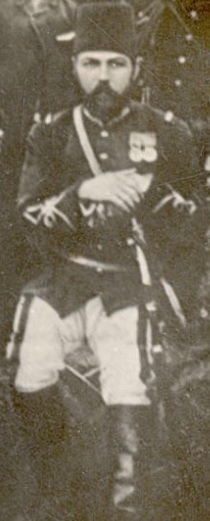
- Born: 1823; Koshutan, Rugova, Albania modern day Kosovo
- Died: 1913 (aged 89–90)
- Family: Muriqi

Kadri Bajri (1823-1913) was an Albanian commander of the Albanian League of Prizren from Rugova.

== Life ==
Kadri Bajri was born in 1823 Koshutan, Rugova, Ottoman Empire, modern day Kosovo. Kadri Bajri was one of the leaders of the Albanian uprisings from Koshutan in Rugova. He was a commander for the League of Prizren in the Battles for Plav and Gusinje, where he arrived with 300 men from Rugova.

== Legacy ==
There are many folk songs about Kadri Bajri in Albanian, such as:

Kadri Bajri po e ç’vesh shpatën,
Po i shkëlqen si hana natën,
Hana natën e dielli ditën,
N’Kaqanik e kanë zanë pritën,
N’Kaqanik të Guri i Ç'pum,
Gjysa dekum, gjysa t’varruem...
