= Nora of Hoti =

Albanian freedom fighter

- Born: 1880–88; Pikalë, Gruda, Sanjak of Scutari, Ottoman Empire, (now in Montenegro)
- Died: 1965
- Other names: Nora Luli
- Occupation: Fighter
- Known for: Fighting Ottoman occupiers

Nora of Hoti or Lula Hoti (Albanian: Nora e Hotit or Nora e Ded Gjon Lulit) (b. 1880–88 – d. 1965) was an Albanian freedom fighter and local heroine who fought alongside Ded Gjon Luli against Serbian and Ottoman armies. Afterwards, during the Zog regime and Communist take over, she was treated badly and interrogated in Shkoder, and his fighters against Ottoman and Serb armies in 1910–1912. Nora Luli was married to Gjelosh Luli, the son of Ded Gjon Luli. Nora was given the "Hero of the People" award.

== Life and death ==
Born in 1880 in Pikalë in Grudë, she grew up and lived in an environment of Albanian highlander warriors with the local men having fought for the League of Prizren. Nora married Kol Ded Luli, son of Ded Gjon Luli. Amongst the highlander warriors were Gjok Luli, Gjergj Deda, Nik Gjelosh Luli, Lek Nishi, Mark Miri, Mark Gjelosh Lula, Kol Miri, Lul Gjeloshi and Luk Gjeloshi and captain Gjelosh Luli, most who ended up dead or as "enemies of the people" during the Communist take over. At a young age, she learned how to use firearms thanks to her father and she became one of the best shooters in the Hoti region. After her father died, she inherited his rifle, and shortly after, she joined Ded Gjon Luli's forces against the Ottoman and Serb armies. Nora organized the Women's Warfare Unit. Many of the women gathered information on the enemy, collected weapons and ammunition and transported them to Hoti.

In 1910, Ded Gjon Luli appointed Nora responsible for the women of Hoti and Tring Smajli for the women of Gruda who fought in Shkoder and Podgorica. On March 23, 1911, the uprising broke out with the battle of Traboin with an Albanian victory. After Albanian casualties, Nora went home to the widows and said "Your men's rifles should not be silenced. Take them you brave women and come take revenge!". The women of Hoti also fought in the Battle of Decic with Nora leading the attack where she was wounded. At the Qafe Unglë, Nora saved some women surrounded by four Turkish soldiers. Nora's husband, Gjelosh Luli, was poisoned by a Serb agent leaving her with young orphaned children. When the communists took over in Albania, her husband was hunted who eventually died in the mountains of Kastrat, and Nora Luli was interrogated in Shkodër and then released. In 1962, on the 50th anniversary of the Albanian independence, Nora of Hoti, at the age of 82, was honored in the official state celebration in Vlora at the invitation of Enver Hoxha. In 1969, her biography was written by Sander Gerra.

== Quotes ==
"In the winter of 1963, my rifle sounded like that of the Hoti and Gruda".
