= Hot, Albania =

Hot
- Village
- Location within Albania
- Coordinates: 42°26′20″N 19°33′19″E
- Country: Albania
- County: Shkodër
- Municipality: Malësi e Madhe
- Administrative unit: Kastrat

Population
  - Total: 1,473
- Time zone: UTC+1 (CET)
  - Summer (DST): UTC+2 (CEST)

Hot is a settlement in the former Kastrat Municipality, Shkodër County, northern Albania. At the 2015 local government reform it became part of the municipality Malësi e Madhe. It has a population of 1,473.

Hoti is home to the historic Albanian tribe of Hoti, one of the oldest Northern Albanian tribes. According to the Albanian Kanun the Hoti are regarded the first out of all Kanun tribes, where they are allocated the head/main seat at special occasions and gatherings.
