= Sharla =

Sharla is an English feminine given name which is a feminine form of Charles. Notable people with the name include:

- Sharla Boehm (1929–2023), American computer scientist
- Sharla Cheung (born 1967), Hong Kong actress and film producer
- Sharla Hinskens (born 1986), also known as Sharmander, Sharmeleon and Sharla in Japan, Canadian YouTuber based in Japan
- Sharla Martiza (born 2003), Indonesian singer
- Sharla Passariello (born 1992), Welsh footballer

== See also ==
- Charla (name)
- Kharla Chávez
- Sharly Mabussi
- Shabla (disambiguation)
- Shala (surname)
- Shapla (disambiguation)
- Shara (given name)
- Sharda (disambiguation)
- Sharga (disambiguation)
- Sharma (disambiguation)
- Shayla (disambiguation)
