= Shala (surname) =

- Language: Albania

Origin
- Region of origin: Shala, modern-day Albania

Shala is an Albanian surname. It may refer to:

- Adenis Shala (born 1998), Kosovan footballer
- Agim Shala (1975–1998), Kosovo Liberation Army commander
- Ahmet Shala, Minister of Economy and Finance
- Andis Shala (born 1988), Albania born Kosovar-German footballer, son of Kujtim
- Arbër Shala (born 1991), Kosovan footballer
- Arlis Shala (born 2000), Albanian footballer
- Doruntina Shala, known as Tayna (born 1996), Kosovar rapper
- Drilon Shala (born 1987), Kosovar-Finnish footballer
- Egzon Shala (born 1990), Kosovan-Albanian freestyle wrestler
- Endrit Shala (born 1981), Kosovar politician
- Fjolla Shala (born 1993), Kosovar association football player
- Florik Shala (born 1997), Luxembourgish footballer
- Herolind Shala (born 1992), Albania born Kosovar-Norwegian footballer
- Jehona Shala (born 2001), Kosovan footballer
- Klaidi Shala (born 1998), Albanian footballer
- Klodiana Shala (born 1979), Albanian athlete
- Kujtim Shala (born 1964), Kosovar Croatian footballer
- Mirjeta Shala (born 1994), Kosovar model and beauty pageant titleholder
- Nita Shala, diplomat, legal scholar and former government official
- Rexhep Shala, Albanian politician
- Rijat Shala (born 1983), Kosovar-Swiss footballer
- Shkëlzen Shala (born 1983), Albanian entrepreneur and veganism activist
- Shyqyri Shala (born 1965), Albanian retired footballer

== See also ==
- Shala (disambiguation)
- Sharla
