= Mavriqi =

Medieval Albanian tribe

Mavriqi was an Albanian tribe (fis) that lived in the Middle Ages. They were the anas (older, indigenous) tribe of the Shala valley, being gradually expelled by the incoming Shala. The tribe gave its name to the modern village of Nënmavriq as well as to a number of micro-toponyms in the highlands of northern Albania (e.g., Vada e Mavriqit and Arat e Mavriqit in Curraj I Epërm, Nikaj-Mërtur).

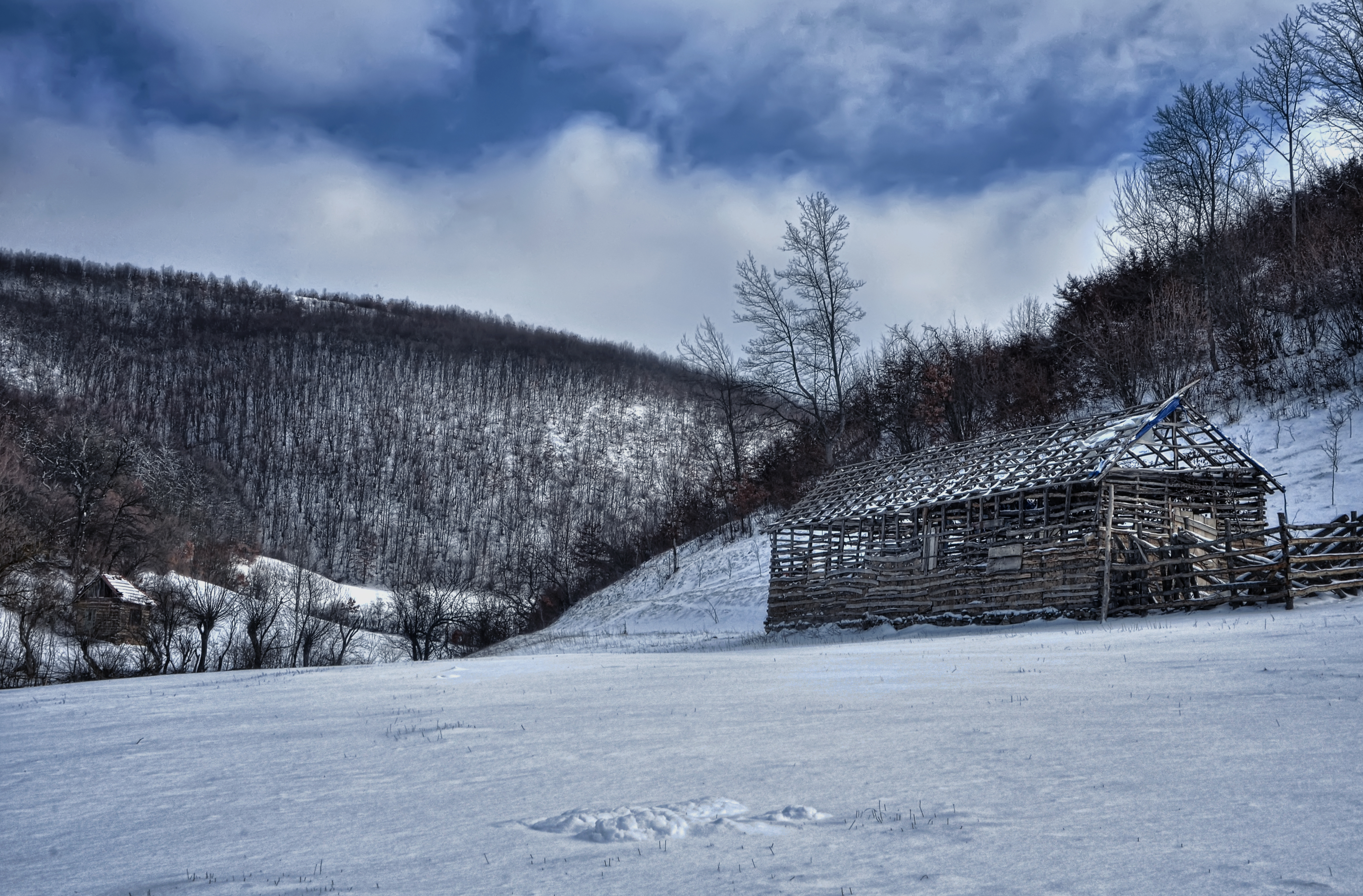
Stable at the village of Nënmavriq

== History ==
The Mavriqi are possibly recorded for the first time in a charter from the Serbian Tsar Stefan Dušan to the Hilandar Monastery in the year 1348 which mentions the village of Murik alongside that of Kalogeni, both in the župa of Pilot, as properties of the monastery. While an exact location cannot be conclusively determined, It has been suggested with much confidence that Kalogeni corresponds to the modern settlement of Kllogjen located in the highlands of Dukagjini, thus making a correlation between Murik and the Mavriqi likely considering the geographic location and range of the latter community.

While their attestation in the fourteenth century is likely but open to contestation, the Mavriqi undoubtedly appear as a community in the historical records of the fifteenth century. In the Venetian cadastre of 1416-17 conducted in Scutari and its environs, the Mavriqi (Maurichi in the register) appear split between two settlements: Mes, located near the later-built Mesi Bridge, and Turk, possibly near modern Ganjollë. Sokjo, Lazër, and Gjergj Mavriqi are attested in the former settlement while Petro and Lazër Mavriqi in the latter. Given the seeming lack of territorialisation required of a true fis, it can be assumed that the Mavriqi were a bashkësi, an Albanian community sharing patrilineal kinship but no clear territorialisation. Later in the Ottoman defter of 1485 for the Sanjak of Scutari, the village of Mavriq appears adjacent to Shala in the nahiyah of Petrishpan-ili with a total of 20 households and could produce 1800 ducats per annum. The majority of household heads bore typical Albanian personal names such as Gjon (e.g., Gjon son of Pashko, Gjon son of Lumira), however, anthroponyms of more general Christian or even Slavic origin are attested (e.g., Nikolla son of Bradimir, Andrija son of Zhupa). A certain Gjon son of Koman is recorded in the settlement, his patronym being the legacy of minor Cuman cultural influence in the medieval Albanian population. In the same register Gjergj and Premt Mavriqi are recorded in Bukmira, while Pulaha argues that Margjin Muriqi from Kuruemira was also a Mavriq.

Unlike the Bobi who befriended the expanding Shala, the Mavriq were eventually outnumbered by them and were pushed to the brink of extinction. Descendants of them have been attested in Shala, Theth, and Curraj i Epërm (Upper Curraj). In Shala, they are believed to have been warriors based at Dakaj below a slope, which gave the name to the fortress there, Nën Mavriq (“below Mavriq”). One theory suggest they were expelled by the Shala, and thereafter moved to Maja e Zezë (Black Top), settling in Curraj i Epërm (Upper Curraj), but were expelled afterwards from there too with Ottoman assistance in the 17th century, being treated as foreigners. There is also some speculation that the Mavriqi were originally non-Albanian speakers, and that they were under the command or rule of a Roman leader named Mauritius, later changed to Mauric and then into Mavriq. However, this has no evidential basis and may be explained by Justinian's efforts to reoccupy and refortify the wider region, which might have given rise to this legend. The depiction of the Mavriqi as foreign in the oral traditions of the Shala bears no ethnic connotation, rather it reflects tribal perceptions of communities outside of the tribe as outsiders and thus foreign. Russian scholar J. V. Ivanova (1922–2006) conducted research in northern Albania in 1956–58 and recorded from the locals that when the Shala had settled the Shala valley, they encountered the native "Mavriqi", from the Puka mountains in the 15th or 17th century, ultimately originating from the Pashtrik mountain near Prizren (in Kosovo) at the end of the 14th century.

In oral tradition, the Nikaj are said to have displaced the Mavriqi. They were said to have stemmed from Vajush near Shkodër and settled in the mountains of Nikaj between the years 1416-1500. With the spread of the Nikaj, most of the Mavriqi emigrated to Gusinje, although some of them remained and were consequently assimilated. They are associated, in particular, with the settlement of Kapit. Historically, the Mavriqi first appear in the territory of Nikaj-Mërturi in the Ottoman defter of 1582 and were based near the village of Kuq with 30 households.

Of the Mavriqi that emigrate to Sandžak via Gusinje, a number settled in villages such as Batrage in the municipality of Tutin, Serbia. According to Ejup Mušović, the Mavriqi of Batrage had arrived from Radavc, Kosovo, although they had originally migrated to the latter village from around Kukës, north-eastern Albania.

The first recorded mass to the Catholic Albanian tribes was held in Mavriq by the Franciscans at Easter in 1636 by Father Benedetto da Soligo. He and Gregoria da Novara were the first Franciscan missionaries that lived in the area, arriving from Mirdita along with priest D. Gjon Gallata as an interpreter, towards the end of January 1636. The 1689 Cantelli map illustrates Mavriq as being associated with the fort and church at Dakaj. The fort of Dakaj, which is referred to by locals as “Qyteza a Dakajve” is registered in historical sources as Mavriq. There is a tradition that after Skanderbegs death, Lekë Dukagjini along with his brother established a base at Mauricium/Mavriq in the Shala valley, i.e the fort of Dakaj. But the site itself likely predates the legend, and it may be vestiges of a Roman fort named Mauricium.

Modern day variants and geographical spread of the name

The Mavriqi and their surviving modern-day versions such as "Mavrić", "Maurić", "Maurich", "Maurizzi", "Maurizi" etc. are spread from Kosovo, Bosnia and Herzegowina, Serbia, Croatia (mainly Istria), Austria (Osttirol, Lienz and the surrounding villages and towns), France, and Germany. It has been suggessted that, as noblemen, other variants spread to Spain and even Mexico. https://www.houseofnames.com/maurizzi-family-crest
