= April 22 =

April 22 this year in various calendars
- Wednesday, 22 April 2026
Akan	Monowukuo
Armenian	6 Mareri 1475
Aztec	Xocotlhuetzi 2, 12 Itzcuintli
Babylonian	4 Nisanu, 2337 SE
Balinese pawukon	Luang, Pepet, Kajeng, Laba, Wage, Maulu, Buda of Ukir, Indra, Erangan, Pati
Bengali	9 Boisakh, BS 1433
Chinese	Yang Fire Tiger・Three Stars Mansion; Fire Horse Year, Month 3, Day 6 (Guyu, 13 days until Lixia)
Common Era	22 April 2026 CE
Coptic	14 Parmouti, AM 1742
Egyptian	6 Thoth, 2775 NE
Ethiopian	14 Miyāzyā, 2018 Amätä Məhrät
French Republican	Décade I, Tridi de Floréal de l'Année 234 de la République
Gregorian	22 April, AD 2026
Hebrew	5 Iyar, AM 5786; Omer 20
Hindu	Ārdrā・Atigaṇḍa; Solar: 9 Vaiśākha, 1948 SE; Lunisolar: Ṣaṣṭhī, Śukla pakṣa of Vaiśākha, 2083 VE; Rāudra・5127 KY・1,872,687
Icelandic	Miðvikudagur, 30 Einmánuður 2025
Islamic	5 Dhu al-Qi'dah, AH 1447 (using tabular method)
ISO week date	2026-W17-3
Japanese	6 Yayoi, Reiwa 8 (Kokuu, 13 days until Rikka)
Julian	9 April, AD 2026 (AM 7534)
Julian day	2461153
Korean	6 Yongdal, 4359 DE
Maya	13.0.13.9.10; 3 Uo, 12 Oc
Roman	ante diem V Idus Apriles, MMDCCLXXIX AUC
Solar Hijri	2 Ordibehesht, SH 1405
Tibetan	6 nag pa, me pho rta 2153 or 1772 or 1000

<<	April					>>
Su	Mo	Tu	We	Th	Fr	Sa
			1	2	3	4
5	6	7	8	9	10	11
12	13	14	15	16	17	18
19	20	21	22	23	24	25
26	27	28	29	30
2026

April 22 in recent years
2026 (Wednesday)
2025 (Tuesday)
2024 (Monday)
2023 (Saturday)
2022 (Friday)
2021 (Thursday)
2020 (Wednesday)
2019 (Monday)
2018 (Sunday)
2017 (Saturday)

April 22 is the 112th day of the year (113th in leap years) in the Gregorian calendar; 253 days remain until the end of the year.

== Events ==
=== Pre-1600 ===
- 960 – Basil II is crowned co-Emperor of the Byzantine Empire.
- 1073 – Election of Pope Gregory VII following the death of Pope Alexander II.
- 1500 – Portuguese navigator Pedro Álvares Cabral lands in Brazil (discovery of Brazil).
- 1519 – Spanish conquistador Hernán Cortés establishes a settlement at Veracruz, Mexico.
- 1529 – Treaty of Zaragoza divides the eastern hemisphere between Spain and Portugal along a line 297.5 leagues (1,250 kilometres (780 mi)) east of the Moluccas.

=== 1601–1900 ===
- 1809 – The second day of the Battle of Eckmühl: The Austrian army is defeated by the First French Empire army led by Napoleon and driven over the Danube in Regensburg.
- 1836 – Texas Revolution: A day after the Battle of San Jacinto, forces under Texas General Sam Houston identify Mexican General Antonio López de Santa Anna among the captives of the battle when some of his fellow soldiers mistakenly give away his identity.
- 1864 – The U.S. Congress passes the Coinage Act of 1864 that permitted the inscription In God We Trust be placed on all coins minted as United States currency.
- 1876 – The first National League baseball game is played at the Jefferson Street Grounds in Philadelphia.
- 1889 – At noon, thousands rush to claim land in the Land Rush of 1889. Within hours the cities of Oklahoma City and Guthrie are formed with populations of at least 10,000.
- 1898 – Spanish–American War: President William McKinley calls for 125,000 volunteers to join the National Guard and fight in Cuba, while Congress more than doubles regular Army forces to 65,000.

=== 1901–present ===
- 1906 – The 1906 Intercalated Games open in Athens.
- 1906 – The Paraguayan Regional Workers' Federation, the country's first national trade union federation, is established in Asunción.
- 1915 – World War I: The use of poison gas in World War I escalates when chlorine gas is released as a chemical weapon in the Second Battle of Ypres.
- 1930 – The United Kingdom, Japan and the United States sign the London Naval Treaty regulating submarine warfare and limiting shipbuilding.
- 1944 – World War II: The 1st Air Commando Group using Sikorsky R-4 helicopters stage the first use of helicopters in combat with combat search and rescue operations in the China Burma India Theater.
- 1944 – World War II: In Greenland, the Allied Sledge Patrol attack the German Bassgeiger weather station.
- 1944 – World War II: Operation Persecution is initiated: Allied forces land in the Hollandia (currently known as Jayapura) area of New Guinea.
- 1945 – World War II: Prisoners at the Jasenovac concentration camp revolt. Five hundred twenty are killed and around eighty escape.
- 1945 – World War II: Sachsenhausen concentration camp is liberated by soldiers of the Red Army and Polish First Army.
- 1948 – Arab–Israeli War: The port city of Haifa is captured by Jewish forces.
- 1951 – Korean War: The Chinese People's Volunteer Army begin assaulting positions defended by the Royal Australian Regiment and the Princess Patricia's Canadian Light Infantry at the Battle of Kapyong.
- 1954 – Red Scare: Witnesses begin testifying and live television coverage of the Army–McCarthy hearings begins.
- 1966 – American Flyers Airline Flight 280/D crashes on approach to Ardmore Municipal Airport in Ardmore, Oklahoma, killing 83.
- 1969 – British yachtsman Sir Robin Knox-Johnston wins the Sunday Times Golden Globe Race and completes the first solo non-stop circumnavigation of the world.
- 1969 – The formation of the Communist Party of India (Marxist–Leninist) is announced at a mass rally in Calcutta.
- 1970 – The first Earth Day is celebrated.
- 1970 – Chicano residents in San Diego, California occupy a site under the Coronado Bridge, leading to the creation of Chicano Park.
- 1974 – Pan Am Flight 812 crashes on approach to Ngurah Rai International Airport in Denpasar, Bali, Indonesia, killing all 107 people on board.
- 1977 – Optical fiber is first used to carry live telephone traffic.
- 1992 – A series of gas explosions rip through the streets in Guadalajara, Mexico, killing 206.
- 1993 – Eighteen-year-old Stephen Lawrence is murdered in a racially motivated attack while waiting for a bus in Well Hall, Eltham.
- 2005 – Japan's Prime Minister Junichiro Koizumi apologizes for Japan's war record.
- 2009 – Fox News host Sean Hannity offered to be waterboarded for charity in order to prove that it did not amount to torture, though he did not follow through with it.
- 2016 – The Paris Agreement is signed, an agreement to help fight global warming.
- 2020 – Four police officers are killed after being struck by a truck on the Eastern Freeway in Melbourne while speaking to a speeding driver, marking the largest loss of police lives in Victoria Police history.
- 2025 – At least 26 people are killed in a terrorist attack on a group of tourists in Pahalgam, Jammu and Kashmir. The Resistance Front (TRF), an offshoot of the Pakistan-based militant group Lashkar-e-Taiba claimed responsibility for the attack.

== Births ==
=== Pre-1600 ===
- 1412 – Reinhard III, Count of Hanau (1451–1452) (died 1452)
- 1444 – Elizabeth of York, Duchess of Suffolk (died 1503)
- 1451 – Isabella I of Castile (died 1504)
- 1518 – Antoine of Navarre (died 1562)
- 1592 – Wilhelm Schickard, German astronomer and mathematician (died 1635)

=== 1601–1900 ===
- 1610 – Pope Alexander VIII (died 1691)
- 1658 – Giuseppe Torelli, Italian violinist and composer (died 1709)
- 1690 – John Carteret, 2nd Earl Granville, English politician, Lord President of the Council (died 1763)
- 1707 – Henry Fielding, English novelist and playwright (died 1754)
- 1711 – Paul II Anton, Prince Esterházy, Austrian soldier (died 1762)
- 1724 – Immanuel Kant, German anthropologist, philosopher, and academic (died 1804)
- 1732 – John Johnson, English architect and surveyor (died 1814)
- 1744 – James Sullivan, American lawyer and politician, 7th Governor of Massachusetts (died 1808)
- 1766 – Germaine de Staël, French author and political philosopher (died 1817)
- 1812 – Solomon Caesar Malan, Swiss-English orientalist (died 1894)
- 1816 – Charles-Denis Bourbaki, French general (died 1897)
- 1830 – Emily Davies, British suffragist and educator, co-founder and an early Mistress of Girton College, Cambridge University (died 1921)
- 1832 – Julius Sterling Morton, American journalist and politician, 3rd United States Secretary of Agriculture (died 1902)
- 1844 – Lewis Powell, American soldier, attempted assassin of William H. Seward (died 1865)
- 1852 – William IV, Grand Duke of Luxembourg (died 1912)
- 1854 – Henri La Fontaine, Belgian lawyer and author, Nobel Prize laureate (died 1943)
- 1858 – Ethel Smyth, English composer (died 1944)
- 1858 – Fritz Mayer van den Bergh, Belgian art collector and art historian (died 1901)
- 1870 – Vladimir Lenin, Russian revolutionary and founder of Soviet Russia (died 1924)
- 1872 – Princess Margaret of Prussia (died 1954)
- 1873 – Ellen Glasgow, American author (died 1945)
- 1874 – Wu Peifu, Chinese warlord, politician, and marshal of the Beiyang Army (died 1939)
- 1876 – Róbert Bárány, Austrian-Swedish otologist and physician, Nobel Prize laureate (died 1936)
- 1876 – Georg Lurich, Estonian wrestler and strongman (died 1920)
- 1879 – Bernhard Gregory, Estonian-German chess player (died 1939)
- 1884 – Otto Rank, Austrian-American psychologist and academic (died 1939)
- 1886 – Izidor Cankar, Slovenian historian, author, and diplomat (died 1958)
- 1887 – Harald Bohr, Danish mathematician and footballer (died 1951)
- 1889 – Richard Glücks, German SS officer and major contributor to the concentration camp system and the Holocaust (died 1945)
- 1891 – Laura Gilpin, American photographer (died 1979)
- 1891 – Vittorio Jano, Italian engineer (died 1965)
- 1891 – Harold Jeffreys, English mathematician, geophysicist, and astronomer (died 1989)
- 1891 – Nicola Sacco, Italian-American anarchist (died 1927)
- 1892 – Vernon Johns, African-American minister and activist (died 1965)
- 1899 – Vladimir Nabokov, Russian-born novelist and critic (died 1977)
- 1900 – Nellie Beer, British politician, Lord Mayor of Manchester (died 1988)

=== 1901–present ===
- 1904 – J. Robert Oppenheimer, American physicist and academic (died 1967)
- 1905 – Robert Choquette, American-Canadian author, poet, and diplomat (died 1991)
- 1906 – Eric Fenby, English composer and educator (died 1997)
- 1906 – Prince Gustaf Adolf, Duke of Västerbotten (died 1947)
- 1909 – Rita Levi-Montalcini, Italian neurologist and academic, Nobel Prize laureate (died 2012)
- 1909 – Indro Montanelli, Italian journalist and historian (died 2001)
- 1909 – Spyros Markezinis, Greek politician, Prime Minister of Greece (died 2000)
- 1910 – Norman Steenrod, American mathematician and academic (died 1971)
- 1912 – Kathleen Ferrier, English operatic singer (died 1953)
- 1912 – Kaneto Shindo, Japanese director, producer, and screenwriter (died 2012)
- 1914 – Baldev Raj Chopra, Indian director and producer (died 2008)
- 1914 – Jan de Hartog, Dutch-American author and playwright (died 2002)
- 1914 – José Quiñones Gonzales, Peruvian soldier and pilot (died 1941)
- 1914 – Michael Wittmann, German SS officer (died 1944)
- 1916 – Hanfried Lenz, German mathematician and academic (died 2013)
- 1916 – Yehudi Menuhin, American-Swiss violinist and conductor (died 1999)
- 1917 – Yvette Chauviré, French ballerina (died 2016)
- 1917 – Sidney Nolan, Australian painter (died 1992)
- 1918 – William Jay Smith, American poet and academic (died 2015)
- 1918 – Mickey Vernon, American baseball player and coach (died 2008)
- 1919 – Donald J. Cram, American chemist and academic, Nobel Prize laureate (died 2001)
- 1919 – Carl Lindner, Jr., American businessman and philanthropist (died 2011)
- 1922 – Richard Diebenkorn, American soldier and painter (died 1993)
- 1922 – Charles Mingus, American bassist, composer, and bandleader (died 1979)
- 1922 – Wolf V. Vishniac, American microbiologist and academic (died 1973)
- 1923 – Peter Kane Dufault, American soldier, pilot, and poet (died 2013)
- 1923 – Bettie Page, American model and actress (died 2008)
- 1923 – Aaron Spelling, American actor, producer, and screenwriter (died 2006)
- 1924 – Nam Duck-woo, South Korean politician, 12th Prime Minister of South Korea (died 2013)
- 1926 – Charlotte Rae, American actress and singer (died 2018)
- 1926 – James Stirling, Scottish architect, designed the Staatsgalerie Stuttgart and Seeley Historical Library (died 1992)
- 1927 – Laurel Aitken, Cuban-Jamaican singer (died 2005)
- 1928 – Estelle Harris, American actress and comedian (died 2022)
- 1929 – Michael Atiyah, English-Lebanese mathematician and academic (died 2019)
- 1929 – Robert Wade-Gery, English diplomat, British High Commissioner to India (died 2015)
- 1930 – Enno Penno, Estonian politician, Prime Minister of Estonia in exile (died 2016)
- 1931 – John Buchanan, Canadian lawyer and politician, 20th Premier of Nova Scotia (died 2019)
- 1931 – Ronald Hynd, English dancer and choreographer
- 1933 – Anthony Llewellyn, Welsh-American chemist and astronaut (died 2013)
- 1935 – Christopher Ball, English linguist and academic
- 1935 – Paul Chambers, African-American bassist and composer (died 1969)
- 1935 – Bhama Srinivasan, Indian-American mathematician and academic (died 2025)
- 1936 – Glen Campbell, American singer-songwriter, guitarist, and actor (died 2017)
- 1936 – Pierre Hétu, Canadian pianist and conductor (died 1998)
- 1937 – Jack Nicholson, American actor and producer
- 1937 – Jack Nitzsche, American singer-songwriter, pianist, and conductor (died 2000)
- 1938 – Alan Bond, English-Australian businessman (died 2015)
- 1938 – Gani Fawehinmi, Nigerian lawyer and activist (died 2009)
- 1938 – Issey Miyake, Japanese fashion designer (died 2022)
- 1938 – Adam Raphael, English journalist and author
- 1939 – Mel Carter, American singer and actor
- 1939 – John Foley, English general and politician, Lieutenant Governor of Guernsey
- 1939 – Ray Guy, Canadian journalist and author (died 2013)
- 1939 – Jason Miller, American actor and playwright (died 2001)
- 1939 – Theodor Waigel, German lawyer and politician, German Federal Minister of Finance
- 1941 – Greville Howard, Baron Howard of Rising, English politician
- 1942 – Giorgio Agamben, Italian philosopher and academic
- 1942 – Mary Prior, English politician, Lord Lieutenant of Bristol
- 1943 – Keith Crisco, American businessman and politician (died 2014)
- 1943 – Janet Evanovich, American author
- 1943 – Louise Glück, American poet (died 2023)
- 1943 – John Maples, Baron Maples, English lawyer and politician, Shadow Secretary of State for Defence (died 2012)
- 1943 – Scott W. Williams, American mathematician and professor
- 1944 – Steve Fossett, American businessman, pilot, and sailor (died 2007)
- 1944 – Doug Jarrett, Canadian ice hockey player (died 2014)
- 1944 – Joshua Rifkin, American conductor and musicologist
- 1945 – Eddy Baldewijns, Belgian politician
- 1945 – Gopalkrishna Gandhi, Indian civil servant and politician, 22nd Governor of West Bengal
- 1945 – Demetrio Stratos, Greek-Egyptian singer-songwriter (died 1979)
- 1946 – Steven L. Bennett, American captain and pilot, Medal of Honor recipient (died 1972)
- 1946 – Paul Davies, English physicist and author
- 1946 – Louise Harel, Canadian lawyer and politician
- 1946 – Archy Kirkwood, Baron Kirkwood of Kirkhope, Scottish lawyer and politician
- 1946 – Nicholas Stern, Baron Stern of Brentford, English economist and academic
- 1946 – John Waters, American actor, director, producer, and screenwriter
- 1948 – John Pritchard, English bishop
- 1949 – Spencer Haywood, American basketball player
- 1950 – Peter Frampton, English singer-songwriter, guitarist, and producer
- 1950 – Jancis Robinson, English journalist and critic
- 1950 – Lee Tamahori, New Zealand film director (died 2025)
- 1951 – Aivars Kalējs, Latvian organist, composer, and pianist
- 1951 – Ana María Shua, Argentinian author and poet
- 1952 – Marilyn Chambers, American actress (died 2009)
- 1953 – Tom Lysiak, Canadian ice hockey player
- 1957 – Donald Tusk, Polish journalist and politician, 14th Prime Minister of Poland
- 1959 – Terry Francona, American baseball player and manager
- 1959 – Ryan Stiles, American-Canadian actor and comedian
- 1960 – Mart Laar, Estonian historian and politician, 9th Prime Minister of Estonia
- 1961 – Jeff Hostetler, American football player
- 1961 – Alo Mattiisen, Estonian composer (died 1996)
- 1961 – Byron Allen, American comedian and businessman
- 1962 – Jeff Minter, British video game designer and programmer
- 1962 – Danièle Sauvageau, Canadian ice hockey player and coach
- 1963 – Rosalind Gill, English sociologist and academic
- 1963 – Sean Lock, English comedian and actor (died 2021)
- 1966 – Mickey Morandini, American baseball player and manager
- 1966 – Jeffrey Dean Morgan, American actor
- 1967 – David J. C. MacKay, English physicist, engineer, and academic (died 2016)
- 1967 – Sherri Shepherd, American actress, comedian, and television personality
- 1970 – Regine Velasquez, Filipino singer and actress
- 1971 – Eric Mabius, American actor
- 1974 – Shavo Odadjian, Armenian-American bassist
- 1976 – Dan Cloutier, Canadian ice hockey player and coach
- 1978 – Paul Malakwen Kosgei, Kenyan runner and coach
- 1979 – Zoltán Gera, Hungarian international footballer and manager
- 1979 – Daniel Johns, Australian singer-songwriter and guitarist
- 1980 – Quincy Timberlake, Kenyan-Australian activist, engineer, and politician
- 1982 – Kaká, Brazilian footballer
- 1983 – Sam W. Heads, English-American entomologist and palaeontologist
- 1983 – Shkëlzen Shala, Albanian entrepreneur and veganism activist
- 1986 – Amber Heard, American actress
- 1986 – Marshawn Lynch, American football player
- 1987 – David Luiz, Brazilian footballer
- 1988 – Dee Strange-Gordon, American baseball player
- 1990 – Machine Gun Kelly, American rapper, singer, songwriter, actor
- 1990 – Kevin Kiermaier, American baseball player
- 1990 – Eve Muirhead, Scottish curler
- 1991 – Danni Wyatt, English cricketer
- 1992 – Adam Lanza, American mass murderer (died 2012)
- 1994 – Chandler Stephenson, Canadian ice hockey player
- 1997 – Grant Fisher, American runner
- 2011 – Violet McGraw, American actress

== Deaths ==
=== Pre-1600 ===
- 296 – Pope Caius
- 536 – Pope Agapetus I
- 591 – Peter III of Raqqa
- 613 – Saint Theodore of Sykeon
- 835 – Kūkai, Japanese Buddhist monk, founder of Esoteric (Shingon) Buddhism (born 774)
- 846 – Wuzong, Chinese emperor (born 814)
- 1208 – Philip of Poitou, Prince-Bishop of Durham
- 1322 – Francis of Fabriano, Italian writer (born 1251)
- 1355 – Eleanor of Woodstock, countess regent of Guelders, eldest daughter of King Edward II of England (born 1318)
- 1585 – Henry of Saxe-Lauenburg, Prince-Archbishop of Bremen, Prince-Bishop of Osnabrück and Paderborn (born 1550)

=== 1601–1900 ===
- 1616 – Miguel de Cervantes, Spanish novelist, poet, and playwright (born 1547)
- 1672 – Georg Stiernhielm, Swedish linguist and poet (born 1598)
- 1699 – Hans Erasmus Aßmann, German poet (born 1646)
- 1758 – Antoine de Jussieu, French botanist and physician (born 1686)
- 1778 – James Hargreaves, British inventor (born 1720)
- 1806 – Pierre-Charles Villeneuve, French admiral (born 1763)
- 1821 – Gregory V of Constantinople, Greek patriarch and saint (born 1746)
- 1833 – Richard Trevithick, English engineer and explorer (born 1771)
- 1850 – Friedrich Robert Faehlmann, Estonian philologist and physician (born 1798)
- 1854 – Nicolás Bravo, Mexican general and politician, 11th President of Mexico (born 1786)
- 1871 – Martín Carrera, Mexican general and president (1855) (born 1806)
- 1877 – James P. Kirkwood, Scottish-American engineer (born 1807)
- 1892 – Édouard Lalo, French violinist and composer (born 1823)
- 1893 – Chaim Aronson, Lithuanian businessman and author (born 1825)
- 1894 – Kostas Krystallis, Greek author and poet (born 1868)
- 1896 – Thomas Meik, English engineer, founded Halcrow Group (born 1812)

=== 1901–present ===
- 1908 – Henry Campbell-Bannerman, Prime Minister of the United Kingdom (born 1836)
- 1925 – André Caplet, French composer and conductor (born 1878)
- 1929 – Henry Lerolle, French painter and art collector (born 1848)
- 1932 – Ferenc Oslay, Hungarian-Slovene historian and author (born 1883)
- 1933 – Henry Royce, English engineer and businessman, co-founded Rolls-Royce Limited (born 1863)
- 1945 – Wilhelm Cauer, German mathematician and academic (born 1900)
- 1945 – Käthe Kollwitz, German painter and sculptor (born 1867)
- 1950 – Charles Hamilton Houston, American lawyer and academic (born 1895)
- 1951 – Horace Donisthorpe, English myrmecologist and coleopterist (born 1870)
- 1978 – Will Geer, American actor (born 1902)
- 1980 – Jane Froman, American actress and singer (born 1907)
- 1980 – Fritz Strassmann, German chemist and physicist (born 1902)
- 1983 – Earl Hines, American pianist and bandleader (born 1903)
- 1984 – Ansel Adams, American photographer and environmentalist (born 1902)
- 1985 – Paul Hugh Emmett, American chemist and academic (born 1900)
- 1985 – Jacques Ferron, Canadian physician and author (born 1921)
- 1986 – Mircea Eliade, Romanian historian and author (born 1907)
- 1987 – Erika Nõva, Estonian architect (born 1905)
- 1988 – Grigori Kuzmin, Russian-Estonian astronomer and academic (born 1917)
- 1988 – Irene Rich, American actress (born 1891)
- 1989 – Emilio G. Segrè, Italian-American physicist and academic, Nobel Prize laureate (born 1905)
- 1990 – Albert Salmi, American actor (born 1928)
- 1994 – Richard Nixon, 37th President of the United States (born 1913)
- 1995 – Jane Kenyon, American poet and author (born 1947)
- 1996 – Erma Bombeck, American journalist and author (born 1927)
- 1996 – Jug McSpaden, American golfer and architect (born 1908)
- 1999 – Munir Ahmad Khan, Pakistani nuclear engineer (born 1926)
- 2003 – Felice Bryant, American songwriter (born 1925)
- 2005 – Erika Fuchs, German translator (born 1906)
- 2005 – Philip Morrison, American physicist and academic (born 1915)
- 2005 – Eduardo Paolozzi, Scottish sculptor and artist (born 1924)
- 2006 – Henriette Avram, American computer scientist and academic (born 1919)
- 2006 – Alida Valli, Italian actress (born 1921)
- 2007 – Juanita Millender-McDonald, American educator and politician (born 1938)
- 2009 – Jack Cardiff, British cinematographer, director and photographer (born 1914)
- 2010 – Richard Barrett, American lawyer and activist (born 1943)
- 2012 – George Rathmann, American chemist, biologist, and businessman (born 1927)
- 2013 – Richie Havens, American singer-songwriter and guitarist (born 1941)
- 2013 – Lalgudi Jayaraman, Indian violinist and composer (born 1930)
- 2013 – Robert Suderburg, American pianist, composer, and conductor (born 1936)
- 2014 – Oswaldo Vigas, Venezuelan painter (born 1926)
- 2015 – Dick Balharry, Scottish environmentalist and photographer (born 1937)
- 2017 – Donna Leanne Williams, Australian writer, artist, and activist (born 1963)
- 2020 – Shirley Knight, American actress (born 1936)
- 2021 – Adrian Garrett, American professional baseball player (born 1943)
- 2022 – Guy Lafleur, Canadian ice hockey player (born 1951)
- 2023 – Len Goodman, English ballroom dancer and television personality (born 1944)

== Holidays and observances ==
- Christian feast day:
  - Acepsimas of Hnaita and companions (Catholic Church)
  - Arwald
  - Epipodius and Alexander
  - Hudson Stuck (Episcopal Church)
  - John Muir (Episcopal Church)
  - Opportuna of Montreuil
  - Pope Caius
  - Pope Soter
  - St Senorina
  - Theodore of Sykeon
  - April 22 (Eastern Orthodox liturgics)
- Discovery Day (Brazil)
- Earth Day (International observance) and its related observance: International Mother Earth Day
- Holocaust Remembrance Day (Serbia)
- From 2018 onwards, a national day of commemoration for the murdered teenager Stephen Lawrence (United Kingdom)
