= Shala (disambiguation) =

Shala is a Babylonian and Akkadian goddess.

Shala may also refer to:

- Shala (film), a 2011 Indian Marathi-language film
- Shala (Kuloy), a tributary of the Nemnyuga in Russia
- Shala (region), a region of northern Albania in the valley of the river Shalë
- Shala (river), a tributary of the Drin in Albania
- Shala (surname), Albanian surname
- Shala (tree), a romanization of the Sanskrit name for the sal tree (Shorea robusta )
- Shala (tribe), an Albanian tribe
- Lake Shala, a lake in Ethiopia

== See also ==
- Sala (disambiguation)
