= Shara =

Shara may refer to:

- Shara District, an administrative subdivision of Iran
- Shara, Leh, a village in India
- Shara (god), son of Inanna and brother of Lulal in Sumerian mythology
- Shara (given name), female given name
- Shara (film), a 2003 Japanese film also known as Sharasojyu
- Shara (The Wheel of Time), a fictional region in Robert Jordan's The Wheel of Time series

== See also ==
- Šara (disambiguation)
