= Šara =

Šara may refer to:

- Šara (mountain), or Shar, a mountain range on the Balkan peninsula
- Shara (god) (Šara), a deity in Sumerian mythology

== See also ==
- Shara (disambiguation)
- Sara (disambiguation)
