= Shara (given name) =

Shara is a feminine given name. Notable people with the name include:

- Shara L. Aranoff, American lawyer
- Shara Gillow (born 1987), Australian cyclist
- Shara Hughes (born 1981), American painter
- Shara Lessley, American poet and essayist
- Shara Lin (born 1985), Taiwanese singer-songwriter and musician
- Shara McCallum, Jamaican-American poet
- Shara Nelson (born 1965), British singer and songwriter
- Shara Nova (previously Worden; born 1974), singer and songwriter
- Shara Proctor (born 1988), Anguillan-British long jumper
- Shara Singh, South African politician
- Shara Venegas (born 1992), Puerto Rican volleyball player

== See also ==
- Shara (disambiguation)
- Sharla
