= Shala (tribe) =

Region in Albania; historic Albanian tribe

Coordinates: 42°19′N 19°47′E

Shala is a historical tribe and region of northern Albania in the valley of the river Shalë, in the Dukagjin Highlands. At the end of the 19th century, the tribe was Catholic and had c. 3,000 members and 700 households.

== Etymology ==
The etymology of Shala is unclear. It has been connected to the Albanian term shalë (sinë) denoting an arid or infertile land, however, this etymology does not seem likely considering that the Shala Valley is among the only regions in the Albanian Alps suitable for agriculture. Folk tradition connects their tribal name to the word shalë ("saddle"), a reference to the legend in which the ancestor of the Shala was given a saddle by his brothers as they departed from one another.

== Geography ==
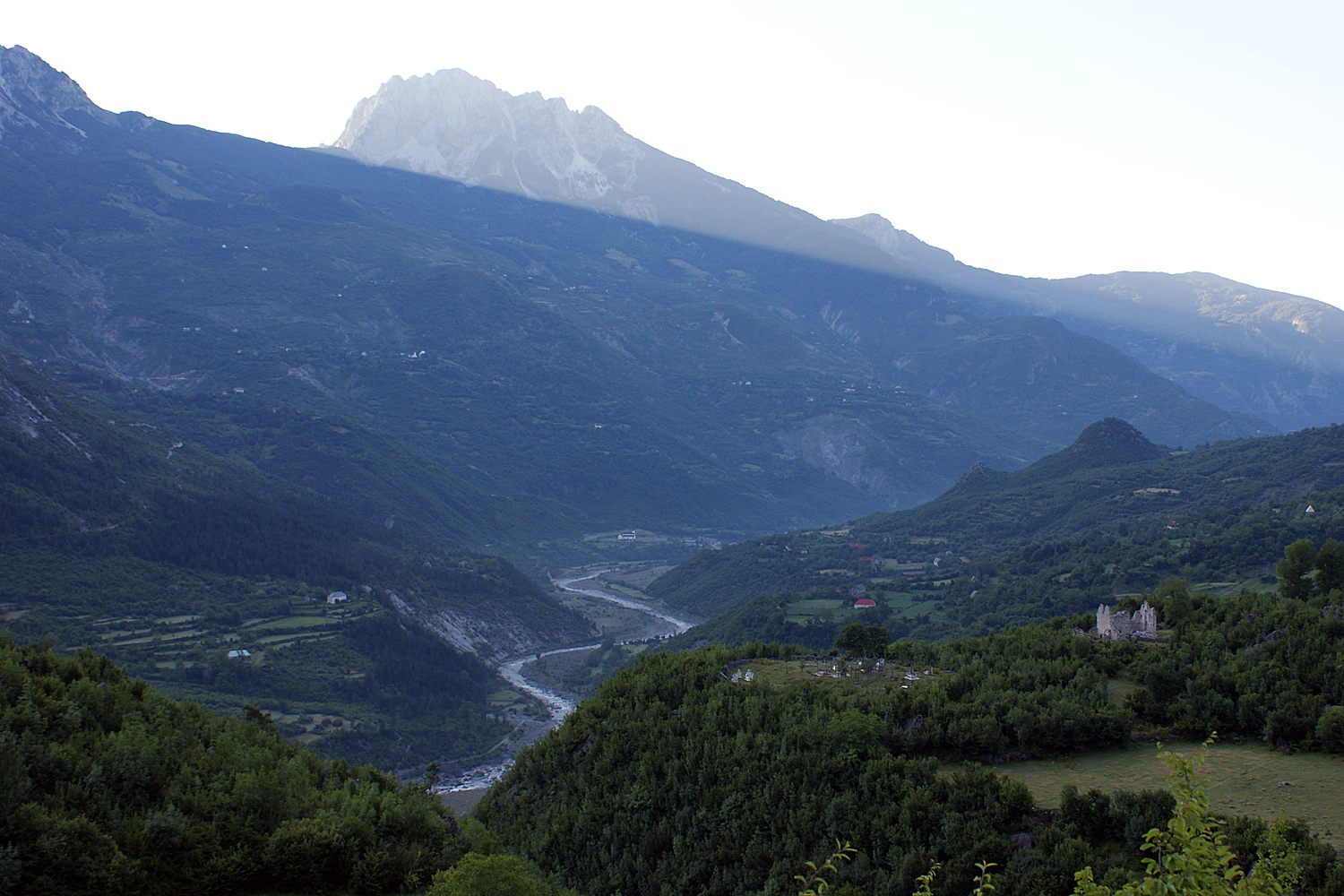
Shala Valley

The tribal region is situated in northern Albania, in the valley of the river Shalë, north of the Drin and south of Theth, in the Dukagjin Highlands. Shala can be broken down into two main sectors: Upper Shala and Lower Shala. Upper Shala is occupied by the village Theth which, under the Ottomans, comprised its own military-administrative unit (bajrak). Theth is made up of 10 neighbourhoods or quarters (mëhallë or lagje): Okol, Nikgjonaj, Gjelaj, Gjeçaj, Ndreaj, Ulaj, Kolaj, Grunas, Stakaj, and Nën Rreth. Ndërlysaj, located to the south, is an extension of Thethi, as is Rrogam located in the Valbona Valley on the other side of the Valbona Pass. Upper Shala is home to some of the highest peaks in Albania, including Maja Jezercë.

Lower Shala is characterised by wider and gentler slopes and topography than that of its northern counterpart. The region is made up of several villages which themselves extend into separate quarters: Gimaj, Nën-Mavriq (also Dakaj), Lekaj, Abat, Nicaj, Pecaj, Breg Lumi, Lotaj, and Vuksanaj which includes Bob. Under the Ottoman administration, Lower Shala would support at least four separate bajraks, that of Pecaj, Lotaj, Lekaj, and Gimaj.

Since the last decade of the 17th century the region of Kosovo and north-western Macedonia was settled by families belonging to Albanian tribes. The most intensive phase of this migration was between the middle of 18th century until the 1840s. This led to division of many tribes including Shala.

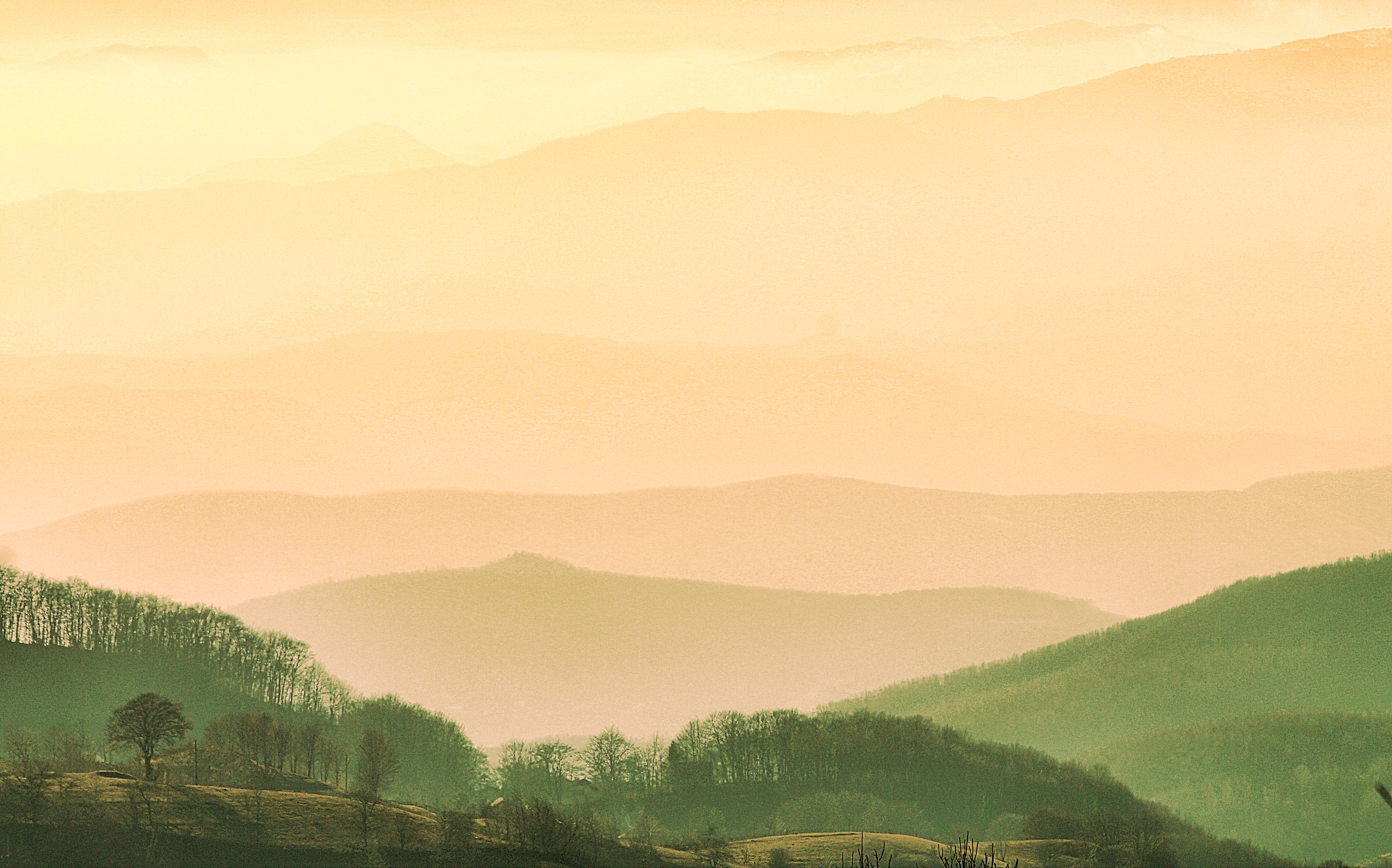
Shala e Bajgorës

Today in Kosovo, the Shala are concentrated primarily around Vushtrri, Mitrovica, and Trepça in the hilly region known as Shala e Bajgorës, Bajgora being the largest of their 37 settlements. They are divided into four clans or vllazni (brothers): the Gima, Peci, Maleti (related to the Lotaj in Albania proper) and the Lopçi. There are also significant numbers of Shala in Peja (Rashiq, Raushiq and Loxhe Village), in Isniq, Lluka e Epërme and Strellç in Ulët near Deçan, in Klina, in Kopiliq near Drenica, and in the settlements between Rakosh and Citak near Istog. Since the 18th century, the village of Isniq near Decan has been settled by Shala tribe. The Shala in Isniq were formed by Lek Vuka and his three sons : Nik, Prek and Vuk. From that time, the Shala descendants increased in numbers until today they number almost 500 houses within and outside the village. From there some families settled in Tomoc, Lluga and Trubuhoc near Istog and Boletin near Mitrovica.

== Origins ==
Based on archival research and the study of local oral traditions and legends surrounding the founding of the Shala as a tribe, it can be concluded that they arrived as part of a wider population movement and redistribution of peoples that occurred following the Ottoman conquests of Albanian-speaking territories in the 15th century.

The core of the Shala fis trace their ancestry to a common patrilineal ancestor, for whom there are a number of oral traditions. According to one legend, the ancestor of the Shala was one of three brothers originally from the area of Pashtrik on the border of north-eastern Albania and south-western Kosovo. As they were departing from each other, the brother from whom the Shala would descend from was given a saddle (shalë), the second a sieve (shoshë), while the third brother received no gift and left bidding his brothers farewell; mirë dita in Albanian. As such, the Shala were named after the saddle their ancestor had been given as a gift from his brothers. The second brother would come to found the Shoshi fis, while the third founded the Mirdita, both located to the south of Shala. In another tradition, the ancestor of the Shala is named as Zog Diti, the son of Dit Murri and grandson of Murr Dedi. Likewise, in this tradition the Shala appear as patrilineal kin with the Shoshi and Mirdita, formed by Zog's brothers Mark and Mir Diti.

Another founding story set later on, following the departure of Zog Diti from his brothers, recounts that the sons of the ancestor Pep Vladi based in Shiroka, fell out with their father as he had taken a mistress in his old age and had a child with her outside of wedlock. The sons eventually left their father and half-brother, settling the Shala Valley. The first settlement they established was Kodër e Thanës. With later generations the Shala would expand. The first brotherhood to split off were the Pecnikaj who settled in Gurra e Abatit and expelled the local anas Koprati tribe from Lekajsh and the Koxhobati from Abat. A branch of the Pecnikaj would then settle in Gurra e Nicajve, displacing the Bobi and expelling the Gzhoba. The Shala would then expand into Pecaj and expel the Agrini from their lands. Following this, the Shala tribe would expand across the entire valley and entirely drive out the local tribes of the Mavriqi, Shdërvella, Gapzhella, Shushella, Murdati, Deshkaj, Maçki, Gjokajushi, and Dekajushi. The native Bobi and Lopçi, however, retained some of their lands and were not entirely expelled. Tradition maintains that the Shala arrived during the 17th century, however, their attestation in 1485 disproves this.

An alternate story recorded in the 20th century maintained that the Shala were formed of four brothers, the sons of Nika: Pec, Dedë, Lot, and Lekë Nika. The Pecnikaj were the first to branch off and eventually came to be divided between the Pecaj and Nicaj which, in turn, founded Doçaj, Pjolli, Vuksanaj i Sipërm, Vuksanaj i Poshtëm (divided between Vuksanaj and Bicaj), Hasanaj i Sipërm, Hasanaj i Poshtëm, Papnikaj, Marnikaj, Mekshaj, Qukë, Dakaj (includes Nën Mavriq of the Mavriqi), Abati (composed of Metushaj and Lotaj), and at the bottom of Abati the older Lopçi were found. The second to branch were the Dednikaj who founded Thethi and its extensions. The third was Lotaj which became divided into Kolmarkaj, Vatgjeçaj, Gjeçaj, Binoshi, and Troja. The final brotherhood to split were the Lekaj who became divided between the Mushi, Rrethi, Pacaj, Gurra, and Qeta.

The Gimaj, located in Lower Shala, are considered a separate fis from the rest of Shala despite their close relations and common history. They are divided between Buçvataj, Dostanishaj, Gagu, Gjelvataj, Kapreja, Marvataj, Niklekaj, Nikushaj, Preklekaj, Xhaferaj, Camaj, Kodër Limaj, Rrogam, Radojë, and Pjeshullaj. Some oral traditions suggest that there is a distant relation between the Gimaj and Shala, with a potential common ancestor in the figure of Murr Dedi. The legends of the Gimaj themselves claim their patrilineal ancestor to be Gim Gjeçi who was the son of Gjeç Gjini and grandson of Gjin Vladi, brother of Pep Vladi the progenitor of Shala. In some stories the figure of Gjin Vladi appears as Dedë Vladi and his son as Gjeç Deda. The chain of descent according to the Gimaj is as follows (from son to father): Gim Gjeçi, Gjeç Gjini (or Deda), Gjin (or Dedë) Vladi, Vlad Stala, Stal Bengu, Beng Zogu, Zog Shiroka, Shirok Gjini, Gjin Murri.

Historical evidence and the oral traditions recorded suggest that the Shala tribe settled the Shala Valley since at least the 15th century and crystallised as a community during the 17th century following a number of expansions wherein the fis expelled or absorbed the local communities spread across the valley. In both the Ottoman registers of 1485 and 1529-36, the Shala occupied a smaller number of households than the local communities of the Shala Valley, suggesting they had not yet fully dominated the territory. However, in 1671 the Shala appear as the dominant community in the region with only the Bobi remaining alongside them.

== History ==
=== Ottoman period ===
The Shala are first recorded in the Ottoman defter of 1485 for the Sanjak of Scutari. In this register, Shala appears as a settlement in the nahiyah of Petrishpan-ili, located roughly between the settlements of Mavriq and Pop (Bobi). The village had a total of 11 households which produced 550 ducats per annum. The anthroponyms recorded are overwhelmingly of an Albanian and Christian character, including personal names such as Gjon, Gjin, Malçori, etc. Among the inhabitants, a certain Andrija son of Prekali from the Prekali is recorded.

During the late Ottoman period, the tribe of Shala was exclusively Catholic and it was a famous Albanian tribe. The tribe of Shala claimed it had four bajraktars (chieftains). For the Shala the process of bloodguilt due to blood feuding was restricted to males of a household that were considered fair game.

After the Young Turk Revolution (1908) and subsequent restoration of the Ottoman constitution, the Shala tribe made a besa (pledge) to support the document and to stop blood feuding with other tribes until November 6.

In 1910, along with some other Albanian tribes, the Shala joined the Albanian revolt of 1910 and the fight between them against the Ottoman forces of Shevket Turgut Pasha attempting to reach Shkodër was fierce.

During the Albanian revolt of 1911 on 23 June Albanian tribesmen and other revolutionaries gathered in Montenegro and drafted the Greçë Memorandum demanding Albanian sociopolitical and linguistic rights with two of the signatories being from Shala. In later negotiations with the Ottomans, an amnesty was granted to the tribesmen with promises by the government to build one to two primary schools in the nahiye of Shala and pay the wages of teachers allocated to them.

=== Independent Albania ===
In 1913, the Shala tribe fought together with the Montenegrin forces during the Siege of Scutari, but switched sides after the Montenegrins attempted to disarm them upon taking over the city.

In 1918, Austro-Hungarian census recorded 431 households and 2,512 inhabitants, inhabiting the settlements and surroundings of Abat, Lekaj, Lotaj, Nenmavriq, Nicaj, Pecaj and Theth.

In 1926, Shala and Shoshi tribe again rebelled but this rebellion was suppressed by the gendarmes led by Muharrem Bajraktari and fighters from Dibra and Mat. After World War II, the communists forced nationalist forces of Albania to retreat to Shala which they controlled throughout 1945 and 1946.

== Economy ==
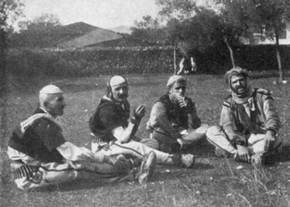
Shala men, photo taken by Edith Durham before 1909.

Members of Shala tribe were very skillful in irrigation. Branislav Nušić recorded that Shala was the poorest tribe of Albania with only small exception of around 400 families who lived in village Isniq, near Deçan.

== Religion ==
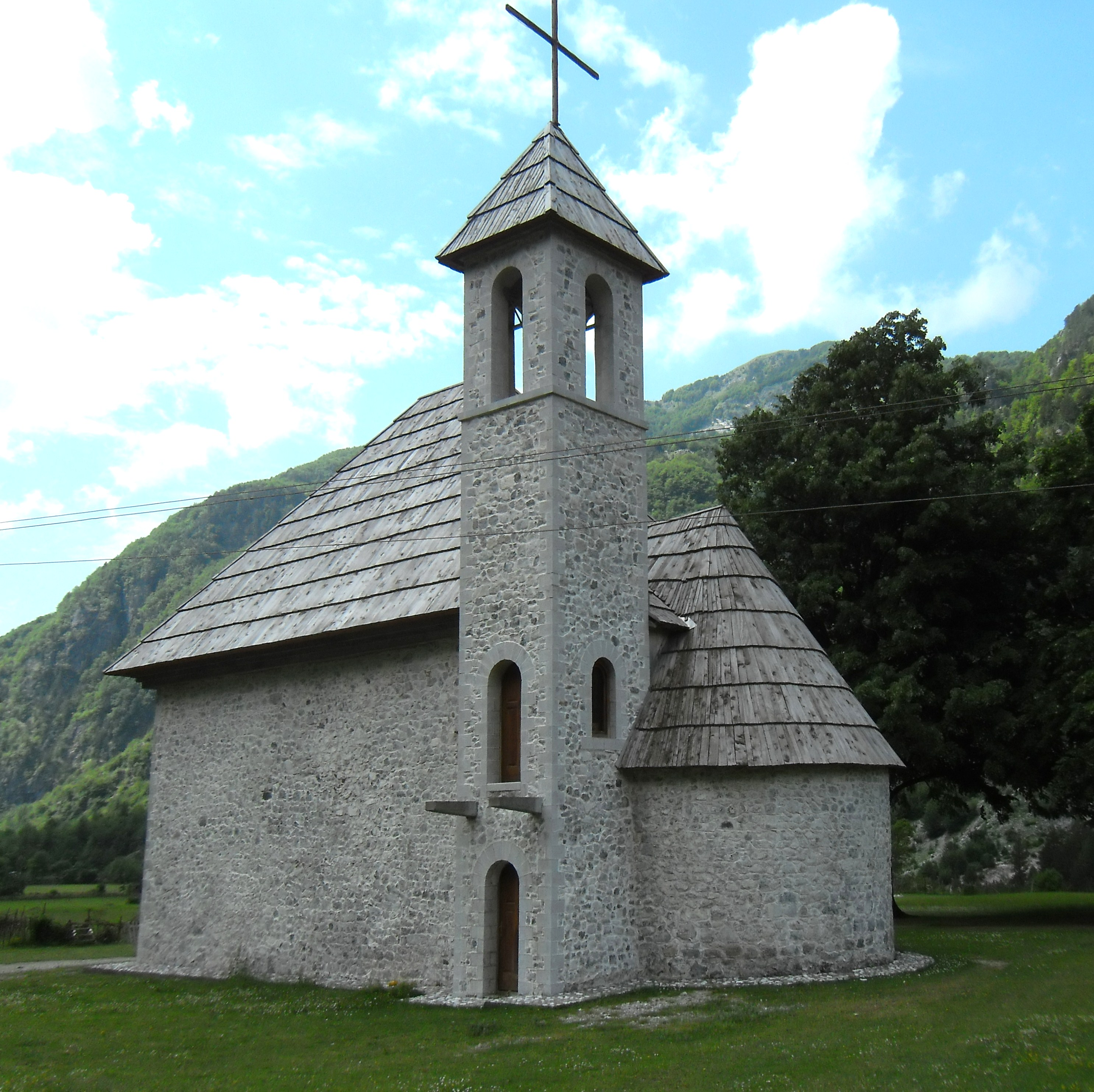
Catholic church in Theth

The patron saint of the Shala is Saint John the Evangelist, whose feast day was celebrated on 27 December.

The religion of the tribe was Catholic while the tribe had around 3,000 members at the end of 19th century. The descendants of the tribe in Kosovo today are Muslim.

== Notable people ==
- Isa Boletini, Albanian revolutionary and nationalist
- Ndok Gjeloshi, Albanian officer
- Mehmet Shpendi, Guerilla fighter
- Ramiz Sadiku, Albanian-Yugoslav Communist
- Agim Shala (September 18, 1975 – September 3, 1998), UÇK fighter in the Battle of Vërrin
- Drilon Shala (born 1987), Kosovar-Finnish footballer
- Endrit Shala (born 1981), Kosovar politician
- Herolind Shala (born 1992), Albania born Kosovar-Norwegian footballer
- Klodiana Shala (born 1979), Albanian athlete
- Kujtim Shala (born 1964), Kosovar Croatian footballer
- Andis Shala (born 1988), Albania born Kosovar-German footballer, son of Kujtim
- Rijat Shala (born 1983), Kosovar-Swiss footballer
- Shkëlzen Shala (born 1983), Albanian entrepreneur and veganism activist
- Doruntina Shala (born 1996), known as Tayna, Kosovar rapper
- Sali Çekaj (1956–1999), UÇK commander and participant in the Battle of Lođa and Battle of Košare.

== Gallery ==
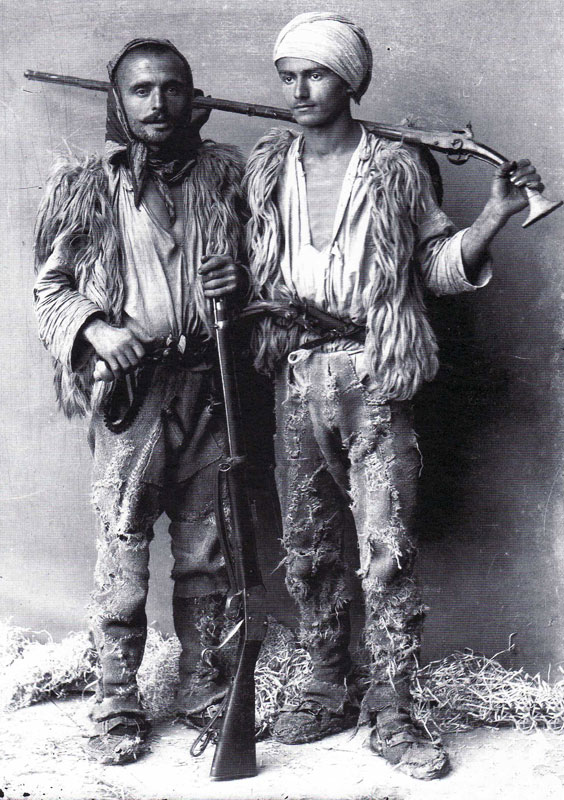
Young warriors of Shala armed with Martini & Tançica by Kel Marubi, ca. 1900–1915.

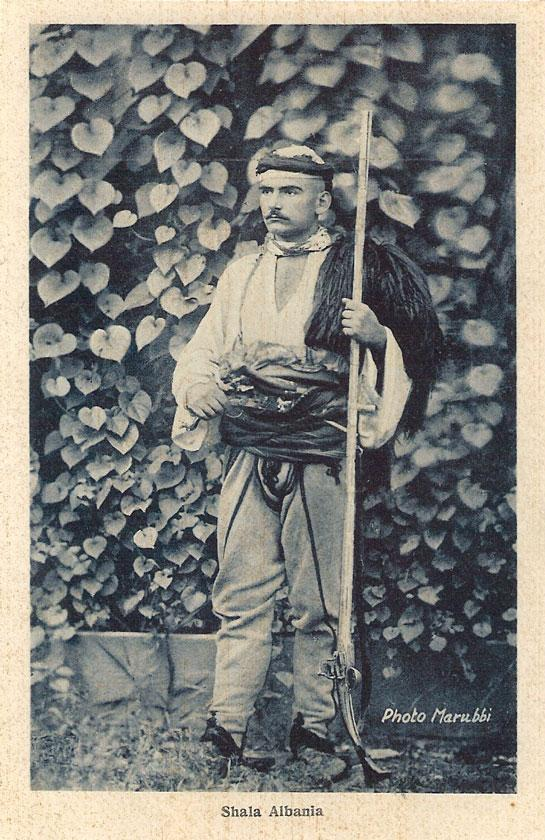
Man from Shala by Pietro Marubi, ca. 1900.

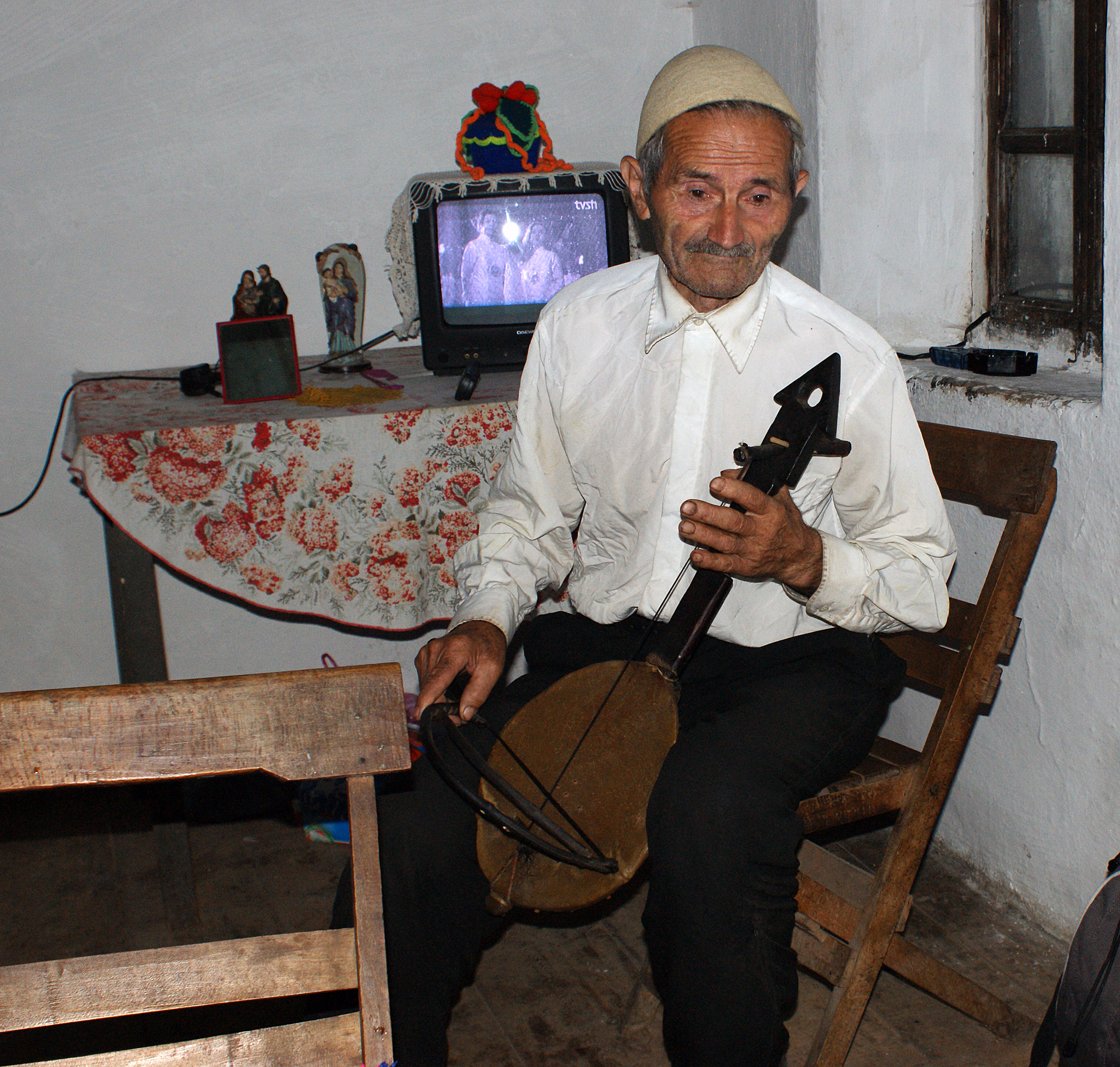
Performer of Albanian epic poetry (lahutar) in Shala.

== See also ==
- Shalë municipality covered by the tribe
- Shala (surname)
- Tribes of Albania

== Bibliography ==
- Elsie, Robert (2003). Historical Dictionary of Albania. Scarecrow Press. ISBN 978-0-8108-7380-3.
- Elsie, Robert (2015). The Tribes of Albania: History, Society and Culture. Bloomsbury Publishing. ISBN 978-0-85772-586-8.
- Galaty, Michael L.; Lafe, Ols; Lee, Wayne E.; Tafilica, Zamir, eds. (2013). Light and Shadow: Isolation and Interaction in the Shala Valley of Northern Albania. Monumenta Archaeologica 28. Los Angeles: Cotsen Institute of Archaeology Press. ISBN 978-1-931745-71-0.
  - Galaty, Michael. "Chapter Three: The Environmental Context". In Galaty et al. (2013), pp. 29–44.
  - Lee, Wayne; Lubin, Matthew; Ndreca, Eduard. "Chapter Four: Archival Historical Research". In Galaty et al. (2013), pp. 45–84.
- Gawrych, George (2006). The Crescent and the Eagle: Ottoman rule, Islam and the Albanians, 1874–1913. London: IB Tauris. ISBN 9781845112875.
- Kaser, Karl (2012). Household and Family in the Balkans: Two Decades of Historical Family Research at University of Graz. LIT Verlag Münster. ISBN 978-3-643-50406-7.
