= Shabla (disambiguation) =

Shabla may refer to:

- Shabla, a seaside town in Dobrich Province, Bulgaria
  - Lake Shabla, a lagoon near the town
  - Shabla Municipality
- Shabla Knoll, a hill on the South Shetland Islands, Antarctica

== See also ==
- Sharla
