= Sharga =

Sharga can refer to the following places in Mongolia:

- Sharga sum, a sum of Govi-Altai aimag;
- Sharga, official name of the Tsagaan-Uul sum center (in Khövsgöl);
- Sharga Nature Reserve, a reserve in the western part of Mongolia.

== See also ==
- Sharla
