= Shapla =

Shapla, Bengali for a type of water lily, may refer to:

- BNS Shapla, a ship in the Bangladeshi Navy
- Shapla Square, a sculpture in Motijheel, Dhaka, Bangladesh

== People with the given name ==
- Shapla Salique (born 1974), British singer

== See also ==
- 2013 Operation at Motijheel Shapla Chattar, a Hefajat-e Islam protest
- Shabla
