= Sharla Boehm =

American computer scientist (1929–2023)

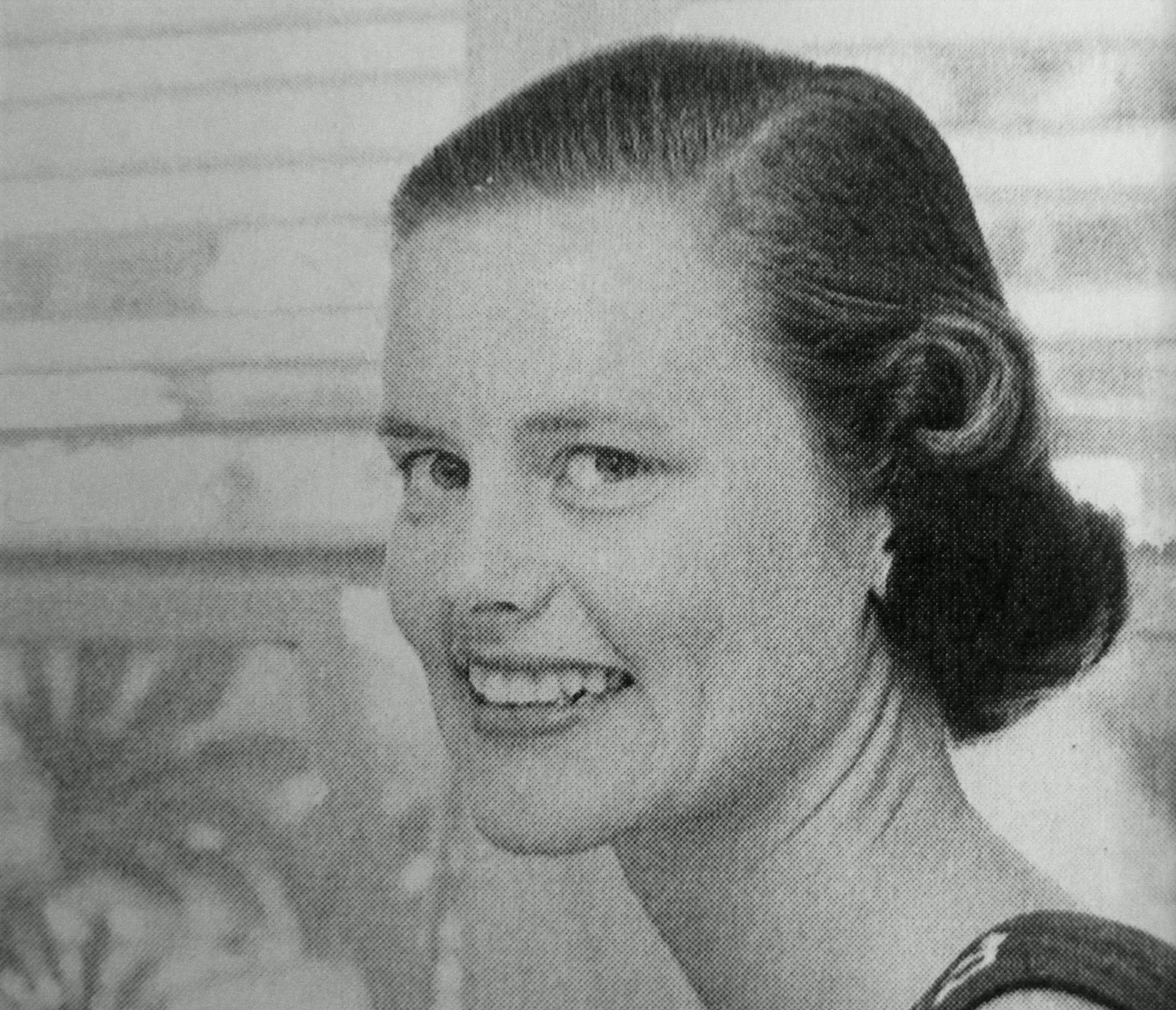
- Sharla Boehm in 1957
- Born: Sharla Perrine; December 4, 1929; Seattle, Washington, U.S.
- Died: April 14, 2023 (aged 93); Santa Monica, California, U.S.
- Education: University of California, Los Angeles
- Scientific career
- Fields: Packet switching
- Workplaces: RAND Corporation

Sharla Boehm (née Perrine; December 4, 1929 – April 14, 2023) was an American computer scientist who carried out pioneering work in packet switching while working for the RAND Corporation in the 1960s.

== Biography ==
Born in Seattle on December 4, 1929, Sharla Perrine moved to Santa Monica three years later. After graduating in mathematics from the University of California, Los Angeles, she taught mathematics and science in Santa Monica schools. She began to work at RAND in 1959 where she met her husband to be, Barry Boehm.

In 1964, together with her colleague Paul Baran, she published a paper titled "On Distributed Communications: II. Digital Simulation of Hot-Potato Routing in a Broadband Distributed Communications Network". As her name appears first in the original paper, she seems to have been the one who was behind the simulation programmed in Fortran, showing that packet switching (or "hot-potato routing" as it was called) could indeed work.

In an earlier paper from May 1960, where only Paul Baran is credited as an author, he directly credits "Miss Sharla Perrine" as the person who wrote a program to perform a Monte Carlo Simulation, further lending credibility to her also writing the code in the 1964 paper. In the 1960 paper the programming language is unnamed.

In RAND and the Information Evolution, Baran describes how Boehm carried out various simulations under different conditions, demonstrating that the protocol routed traffic efficiently. In particular, it was discovered that if half the network was destroyed, the remainder reorganized and began routing again in less than a second.

In a 1996 paper on "An Early Application Generator and Other Recollections", Barry Boehm notes that Sharla Boehm "had developed the original packet-switched network simulation with Paul Baran", a development which led him to become involved in the pioneering ARPAnet Working Group. It seems likely he is referring to the May-1960 paper "Reliable Digital Communications Systems Using Unreliable Network Repeater Nodes" described and referenced above.

Sharla Boehm died in Santa Monica on April 14, 2023, at the age of 93.
