= Bobi (tribe) =

Bobi was an Albanian tribe that lived in the Middle Ages. They were the anas (older, indigenous) tribe of the Shala valley, being gradually expelled by the modern Shala.

The Bob (or Bop) tribe is more clearly distinguishable from other anas tribes of the region. It has only a few households that still exist in the Nicaj neighborhood of Shala. In the 1485 Ottoman cadaster of the sanjak of Shkodër the village of Pop is mentioned as one of the villages forming the nahija of Petrishpan. The village has 5 households and could be an annual 250 ducats. The heads of the households were: Gjoni son of Xhuvan, Lukal son of Kabil, Lukan son of Stanisha, Marin son of Draniç. The priest Pjetro Stefano Gaspari, wrote an extensive account of areas of Albania in 1671, notes that the Bob village in Shala “included 13 households with 58 people” This account is reinforced by Ernesto Armao's 1933 commentary on Gaspari which notes that the Bob village in Shala only had 13 houses as of 1905, and the 1918 Austrian census of the area which found only 12 houses and 73 persons. Bob/Bop (“Robbi”) is also shown on the 1688 Coronelli map .

According to tradition, the village of Bob is the oldest in the valley, being inhabited before the arrival of intrusive tribes. It is believed that the founders of the Shala fis in the Shala Valley arrived in the wake of the Ottoman conquest of Shkodra in the 1470s, likely in the form of a small number of patriarchal families. When the Shalas moved into the valley, they found Bobi there, in addition to other tribes such as the Mavriqi whom the Shala tribesmen would expel. The majority of the Bob fis moved, likely under pressure from the Shala, to regions such as Pukë, in the Firë and Kokë-Dodë villages, while likely further branching off westwards to Kaçanik in Kosovo.

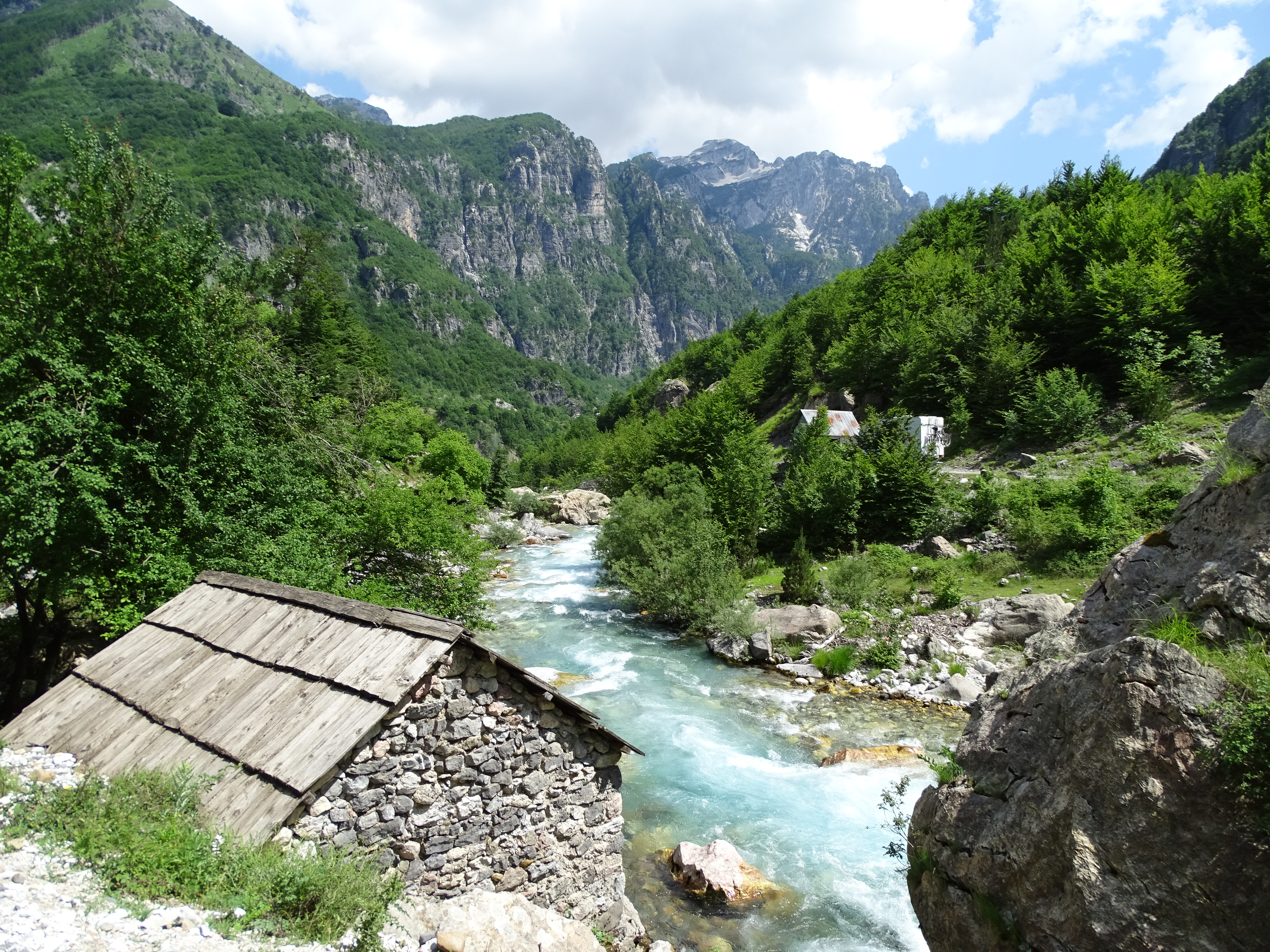
The Bobi inhabited the modern Shala valley

A branch of the Pecnikaj brotherhood of Shala moved into Gurra e Nicajve (the Nicaj stream) and through doing so would further push away the Bobi. Armao reports that although they were considered part of the Shala, a tradition that the inhabitants of Bob were descended from a people predating the Shala fis was prevalent. They were considered anas in tribal councils as well, and would occupy the margins of such gatherings.

In contrast to the Mavriqi who were brought to the brink of extinction, the Bobi tribe befriended the newer arrivals, and gradually adopted their tribal identity becoming fise të shoqnue (befriended fis). The Bob tribe continues to retain a distinct tribal identity, especially in comparison to other absorbed tribes in the region.
