= Nita Shala =

Kosovar diplomat and legal scholar

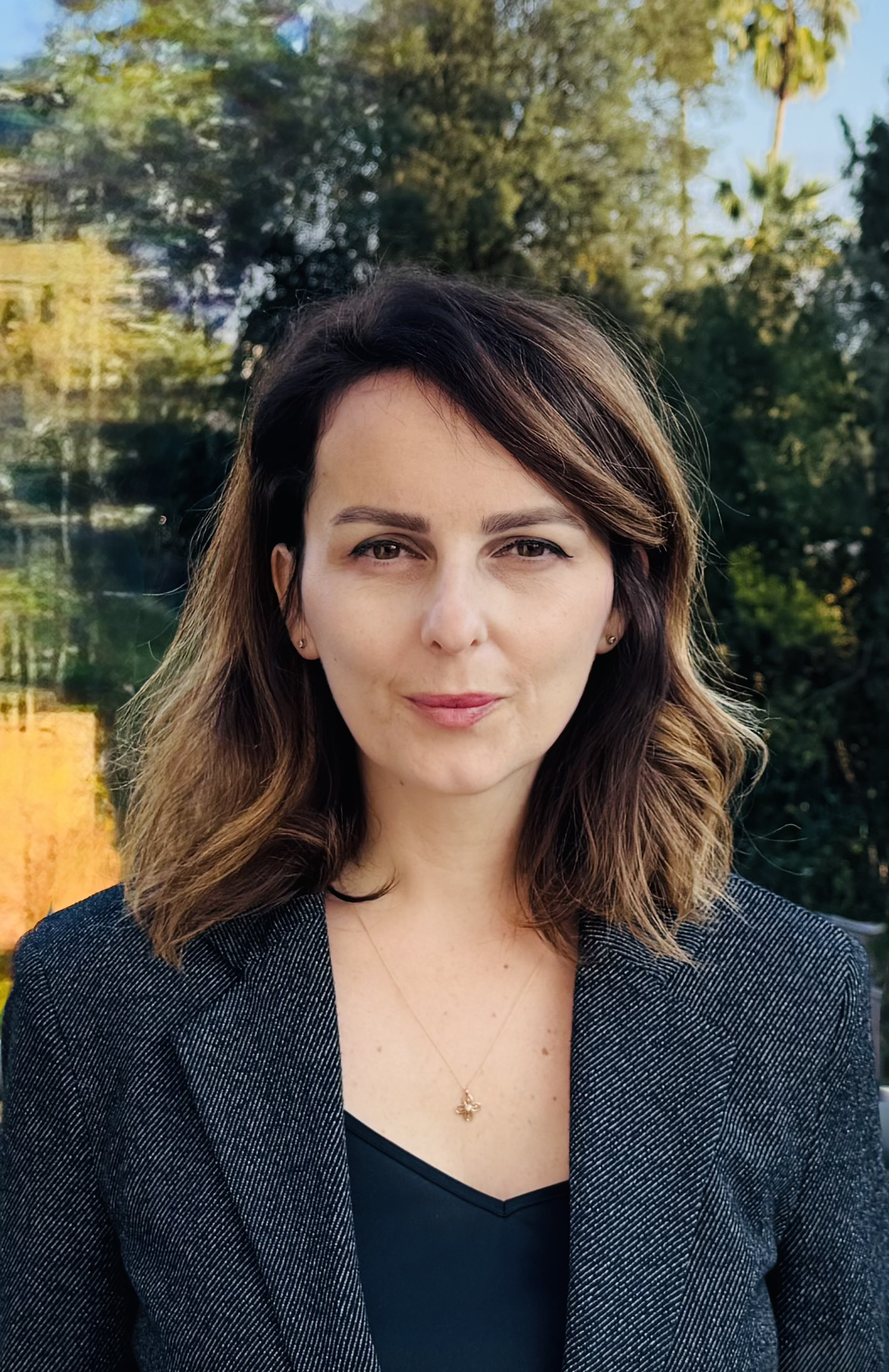
- Nita Shala, 2025

Ambassador of Kosovo to Italy
- Incumbent
- Assumed office 2 October 2024
- Appointed by: Vjosa Osmani

Deputy Minister of Justice
- In office 18 March 2020 – 30 September 2022
- Appointed by: Albin Kurti

Personal details
- Education: MSc (University of Oxford, 2011–2012); PhD (Geneva Graduate Institute, 2013–2018); Executive Education (Harvard Kennedy School)
- Alma mater: University of Oxford; Graduate Institute of International and Development Studies
- Occupation: Diplomat; legal scholar
- Website: https://mfa-ks.net

Nita Shala is a diplomat, legal scholar, and former government official who has served as the Ambassador of the Republic of Kosovo to Italy since 2024, with concurrent accreditation to Malta and San Marino. She previously served as Deputy Minister of Justice of Kosovo and is affiliated with the University of Pristina as an assistant professor of law.

== Education ==
Shala completed postgraduate studies at the University of Oxford, where she earned a Master of Science (MSc) degree in Criminology and Criminal Justice through the Centre for Criminology at the Faculty of Law.

She later completed a Doctor of Philosophy (PhD) in International Law at the Graduate Institute of International and Development Studies in Geneva. Her doctoral research focused on guarantees of non-repetition for violations of human rights, and her thesis was defended in 2018.

== Career ==
=== Academic career ===
Nita Shala serves as an assistant professor at the University of Pristina in Kosovo, where she is affiliated with the Faculty of Law.

=== Government service ===
In 2021, Shala was appointed Deputy Minister of Justice of the Republic of Kosovo by the government led by Prime Minister Albin Kurti. During her tenure, she engaged in justice and rule-of-law–related matters and interacted with international partners, including the European Union Rule of Law Mission in Kosovo (EULEX).

=== Diplomatic service ===
Shala began her role as Ambassador of the Republic of Kosovo to Italy in 2024. She presented her credentials to the President of the Italian Republic at Quirinal Palace.

As part of her diplomatic role, Shala has undertaken official visits across Italy and participated in meetings with local institutions and minority communities, including engagements in Calabria involving Arbëreshë communities, and meetings with Italy’s Undersecretary for Foreign Affairs, Maria Tripodi, in the context of relations between Italy, Kosovo, and the Western Balkans.

Her diplomatic accreditation also includes service as a non-resident ambassador to Malta and San Marino, where she presented her credentials to the respective heads of state.

She is deeply committed to youth empowerment and social impact. She founded the Young Shapers of Albania Hub and has held leadership roles as Curator of the Global Shapers Community and Country Chair for Global Dignity in Albania and Kosovo.

== Public speaking and media ==
Shala has appeared in Italian media and public events in her capacity as ambassador. In February 2025, she participated in a broadcast interview on Radio Radicale following Kosovo’s parliamentary elections. Italian regional media have also reported on public lectures, including a lecture at UniOlbia reported by the Municipality of Olbia.

== Selected works ==
- Shala, Nita (2024). Guarantees of Non-Repetition in International Human Rights Law and Transitional Justice: Building Peace after Conflict. London: Routledge. ISBN 9781032602127. Publisher page
- Shala, Nita (2018). Guarantees of Non-Repetition for Violation of Human Rights. PhD thesis, Graduate Institute of International and Development Studies, Geneva. Institutional page
- Shala, Nita (2024). The Criminal Justice System in Albania: Executive Summary. Open Society Foundations – Western Balkans. PDF
- Shala, Nita; Pratola, Gianluigi (2023). “The Hard Prison Regime in Albania: An Evaluation of Its Potential in Countering Organized Crime and Its Ramifications.” Journal of Criminal Investigation and Criminology, 74(4). PDF
- Shala, Nita; Puka, Avni; Pratola, Gianluigi (2021). “Criminalization of Animal Cruelty in Context: An Albanian Perspective.” Zbornik Pravnog fakulteta u Zagrebu, 71(6), 921–950. doi:10.3935/zpfz.71.6.05.
- Shala, Nita (2016). “Korrupsioni, pandëshkueshmëria dhe nevoja e një misioni ndërkombëtar.” Reporter.al (BIRN Albania).
- Shala, Nita (2016). “Leksione nga Amerika Latine për korrupsionin e madh në Kosovë.” Reporter.al (BIRN Albania).
