= Chaim Aronson =

Lithuanian Jewish inventor and memoirist

Chaim Aronson (July 30, 1825 – April 22, 1893) was a Lithuanian Jewish inventor and memoirist.

Aronson is remembered today for his memoirs, which were published long after his death in a book titled A Jewish Life under the Tsars, which he wrote in Hebrew.

== Early life ==
Aronson was born in the town of Serednik (now Seredžius) in the province of Lithuania, then part of the Russian Empire, to a poor, rural family. He showed unusual intelligence at a very early age and reportedly had learned to read Hebrew by the age of two. Before his twenties, he was an accomplished (but not certified) Jewish scholar. He also learned German and Russian and achieved a high level of fluency in these languages.

== Inventions ==
Aronson was a talented engineer, although he had had no formal education in this field. He first became a clockmaker and, later, an inventor. His early successes were such that he soon moved his business to the Russian capital, St. Petersburg, where factory owners and investors might be interested in his inventions.

However, despite several revolutionary inventions, he never achieved commercial success, due to an unfriendly business climate and the antisemitic practices of the Tsarist government.

His inventions included several machines for mass-producing cigarettes, a clockwork calculator, a prototype for a movie camera, and the microdiorama.
