= Shkëlzen Shala =

Kosovo Albanian entrepreneur and activist (born 1983)

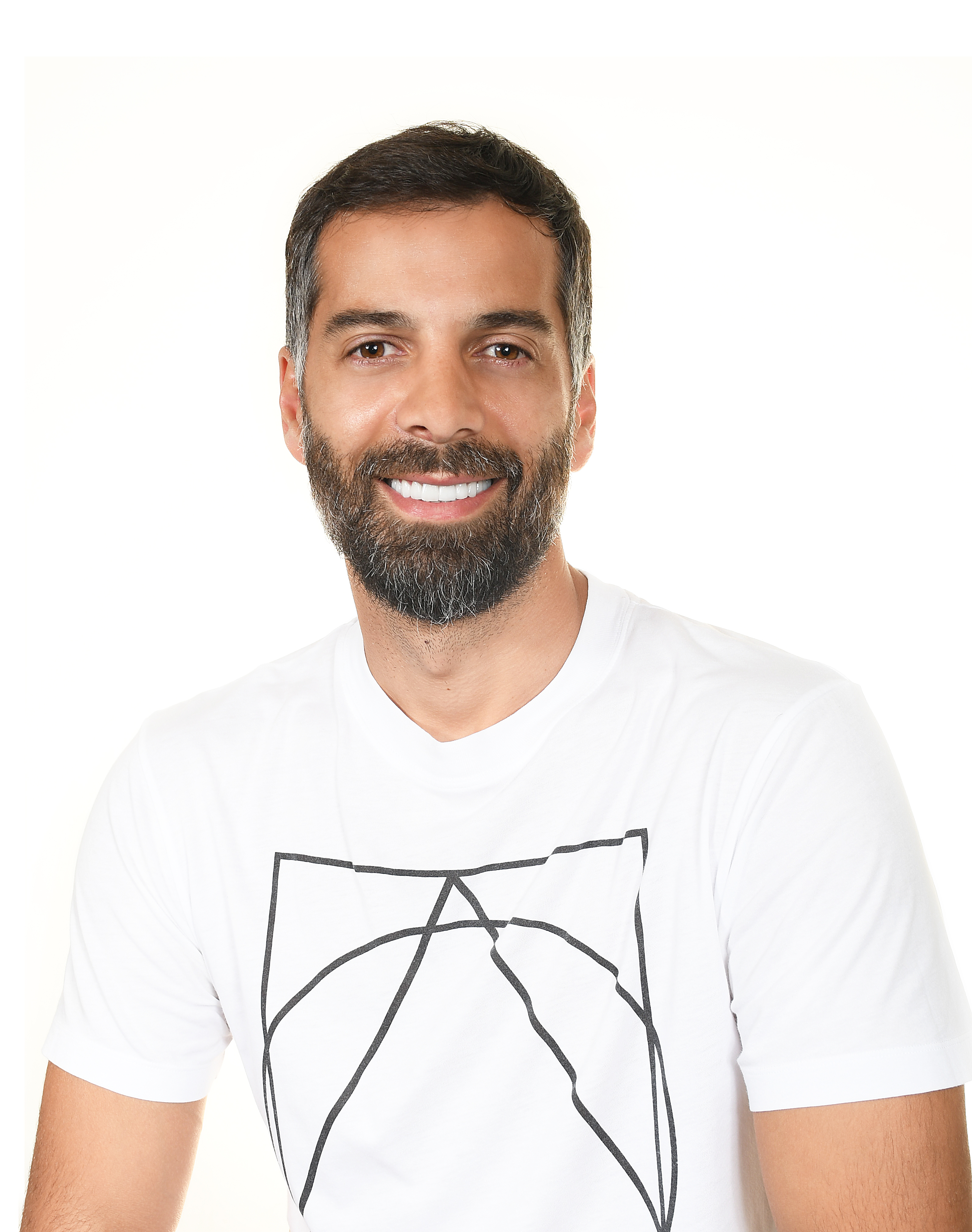
- Born: April 22, 1983 (age 43); Pristina, SFR Yugoslavia (now Kosovo)
- Occupations: Activist, entrepreneur, gastronome
- Known for: Veganism activism

Shkëlzen Shala (born 22 April 1983) is a Kosovo Albanian entrepreneur, gastronome and veganism activist based in Pristina, Kosovo.

== Early life ==
Shkëlzen Shala was born on 22 April 1983 in Pristina, at the time part of Yugoslavia, to Ismet and Drita. His granddad was a well-known farmer in Yugoslavia, while his father was a school teacher in Pristina.

He studied scenography and economics at the University of Pristina.

== Career ==
Shkëlzen Shala started working at an early age, running his family business together with his brother, a restaurant in Pristina which was then expanded into a hotel, named Garden. The hotel, which was designed by Shala himself without the help of professional architects, started to attract national and international celebrities such as Sophie, Countess of Wessex, Dua Lipa, Ramë Lahaj, Era Istrefi, Elvana Gjata, and Arilena Ara, among others.

Shala became vegan after being influenced by documentary films such as What the Health and The Game Changers, and started to advocate for the benefits of veganism in various national media in Kosovo, including Radio Television of Kosovo and Kohavision. In 2018, he partook in the Spartan Race in Florence, Italy, and although he was fed entirely by vegan ingredients, he did not experience any lack of energy. In 2020, he established the first entirely vegan restaurant in Kosovo. Shala believes that "everyone should be vegan", and believes that people who practice veganism encounter numerous benefits, such as a better quality of sleep, increased levels of energy, and a better body shape. His favorite vegan ingredients include oatmeal, seeds, legumes, nuts, fruits, and plant milk.

== Personal life ==
Shkëlzen Shala is married to Arza Shala and has two daughters, Aria and Ana. He has three siblings, including a brother, Shpend, and two sisters, Shqipja and Shqiponja.
