= Fierzë =

Fierzë may refer to several features in Albania:

- Fierzë, Elbasan, a village in the municipality of Belsh, Elbasan County
- Fierzë, Lezhë, a village in the municipality of Mirditë, Lezhë County
- Fierzë, Shkodër, a village in the municipality of Fushë-Arrëz, Shkodër County
- Fierzë, Kukës, a village in the municipality of Tropojë, Kukës County
- Fierza Reservoir
- Fierza Hydroelectric Power Station
