= Koman =

Koman may refer to:

- Küman, a municipality in Azerbaijan, also spelled Koman
- Koman, Albania, a settlement in Albania
- Koman culture, a medieval Albanian culture
- Koman (hotel), in Kinosaki, Hyōgo prefecture, Japan
- Koman Hydroelectric Power Station, in Albania
- Koman, Iran, a settlement in Iran
- Koman languages, a subgroup of the Nilo-Saharan language family

== People ==
- İlhan Koman, Turkish sculptor
- Jacek Koman, Polish actor and singer
- Vladimir Koman, Hungarian footballer
