= Vau i Dejës Hydroelectric Power Station =

Hydroelectric power station in Albania

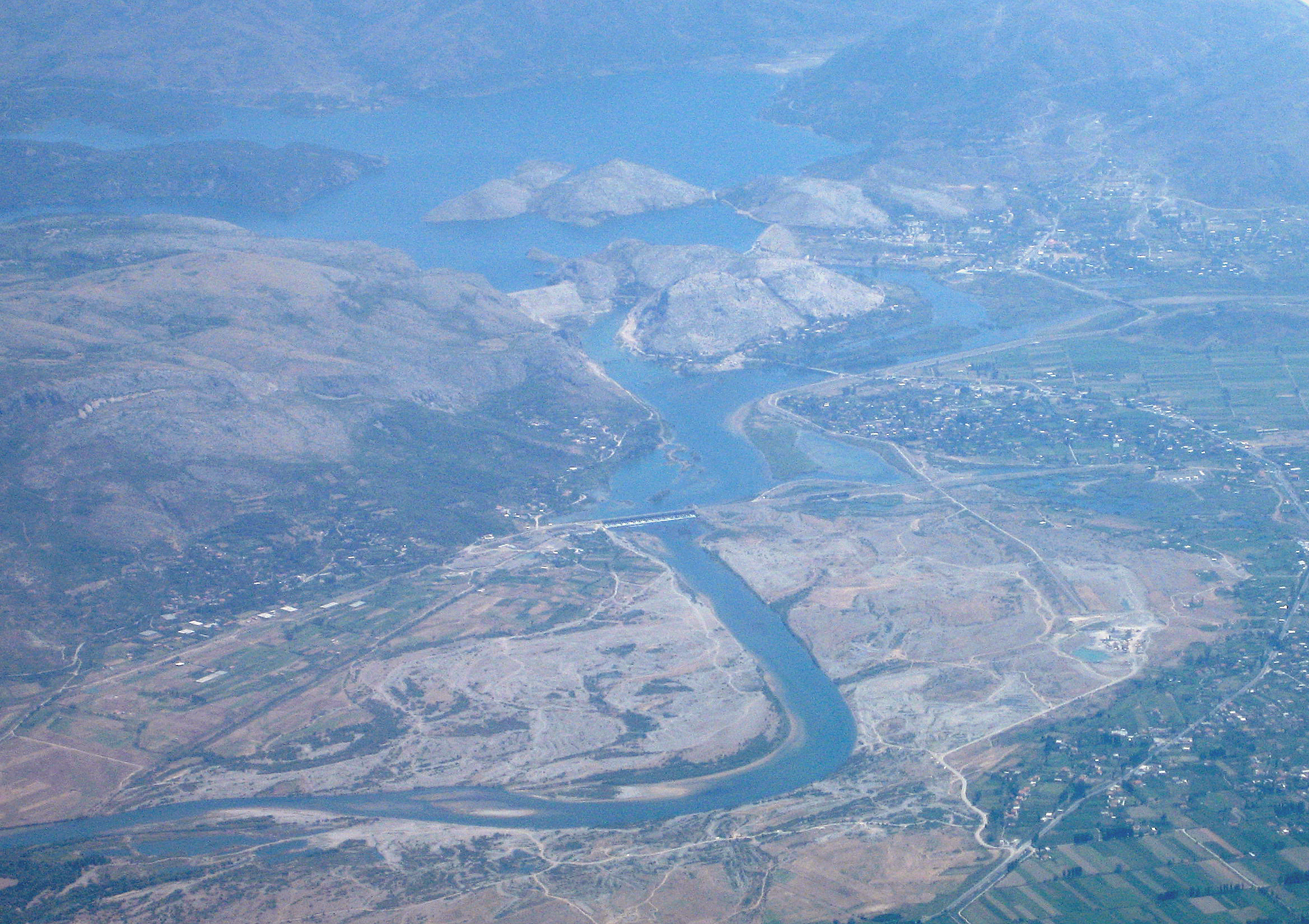
- An aerial photo of the station and its reservoir
- Interactive map of Vau i Dejës Hydroelectric Power Station
- Location: Vau i Dejës gorge, Albania
- Coordinates: 42°00′49″N 19°38′09″E
- Construction began: 1971
- Opening date: 1973
- Owner: Albanian Power Corporation

Dam and spillways
- Impounds: Drin river
- Height: 76 m (249 ft)
- Spillway capacity: 7,500 m^{3}/s (16,000,000 cu ft/min) or 7,740 m^{3}/s (16,400,000 cu ft/min)

Reservoir
- Creates: Lake Vau i Dejës (Albanian: Liqeni i Vaut të Dejës)
- Total capacity: 580,000,000 m^{3} (2.0×10^{10} cu ft) (maximum); 263,000,000 m^{3} (9.3×10^{9} cu ft) (active)
- Surface area: 26 km^{2} (10 sq mi)
- Maximum length: 20 km (12 mi)

Power Station
- Operator: Albanian Power Corporation
- Commission date: 1973
- Turbines: 5 × 50 MW Francis turbines
- Installed capacity: 250 MW
- Annual generation: 1000 Gwh
- Website https://www.kesh.al/en/service/hec-vau-i-dejes/

The Vau i Dejës Hydroelectric Power Station (Note: Albanian: Hidrocentrali i Vaut të Dejës, abbreviated Vau i Dejës HPP) is a hydroelectric dam on the Drin river, in Albania, near the settlement of Vau i Dejës. Completed in 1973, the project consists of five turbines of French origin, each with a nominal capacity of 50 megawatts (MW), for a total capacity of 250 MW. It is operated by the Albanian Power Corporation.

The Vau i Dejës power station is the most downstream of the three dams of the Drin river cascade, with the power stations of Fierza and the Koman upstream.

The hydroelectric station was turned into a hybrid power station, with the installation of photovoltaic panels on one of its dams. As of 2026, there are plans to add more photovoltaics, on its two other dams as floating solar and ground-mounted photovoltaics, as well as to incorporate wind turbines.

== History ==
China agreed to provide funding for the power station, in September 1967. Due to the Albanian–Soviet split, China assisted Albania with various major industrial processes. Construction began in the autumn of 1971, during Albania's fifth five-year plan. Soon after its completion in 1973, it provided more than half of Albania's electricity and was the first dam on the Drin river. The dam's construction created Lake Vau i Dejës and increased Albania's electricity-generating capacity. This supported industrial development and contributed to electricity exports.

Previously, the dam was called the Mao Zedong Hydropower Plant (Note: Also called the Mao Ce Dun Hydropower Plant, or Mao Tse-tung hydroelectric plant) and was the largest hydroelectric project in Albania. The Mao Zedong plant generated 250 MW of power, across two small hydroelectric and two medium-sized thermal power stations. A reservoir accompanied the dam. According to Time magazine, the hydroelectric plant "brought electricity to every rural district".

The power station, along with Koman Hydroelectric Power Station and Fierza Hydroelectric Power Station, was described to be one of Albania's "communist legacies". By January 1994, these dams generated 1.5 gigawatts (GW) of electricity; their reservoirs were also used for tourism and transportation. This group of dam has also been described as the "three main hydropower" units in Albania.

Vau i Dejës has experienced regular flooding, which has impacted the area around Shkodër. In 2010–2011, flooding was particularly acute. In 2018, concerns arose that the dam could flood like 2010–2011 once again, after heavy rainfall, a sudden rise in temperatures, and increased water flow. As the reservoir approached capacity, the dam was forced to release water. Payments were made to Shkodër for damage caused by repeated flooding. As of 2026, the dam causes floods and soil erosion in Lake Koman.

In 2010, Styzostedion lucioperca, a fish that is invasive in Albania, was found in Lake Vau i Dejës, where it spread to the Drin river. This was suspected to be because of flooding causing the dam's management to open the spillways, where the fish then entered.

In 2025, the Agence Française de Développement and the Albanian Power Corporation signed a memorandum on the development of the Drin river's dams (including Koman, Fierza, and Vau i Dejës plants). Mainly, France focused on modernizing existing energy infrastructure through technical assistance, in hopes of developing storage capacity, mitigating flooding, and optimizing electricity generation. In the five years prior, France was increasingly involved in Albania's energy sector.

== Design and operation ==
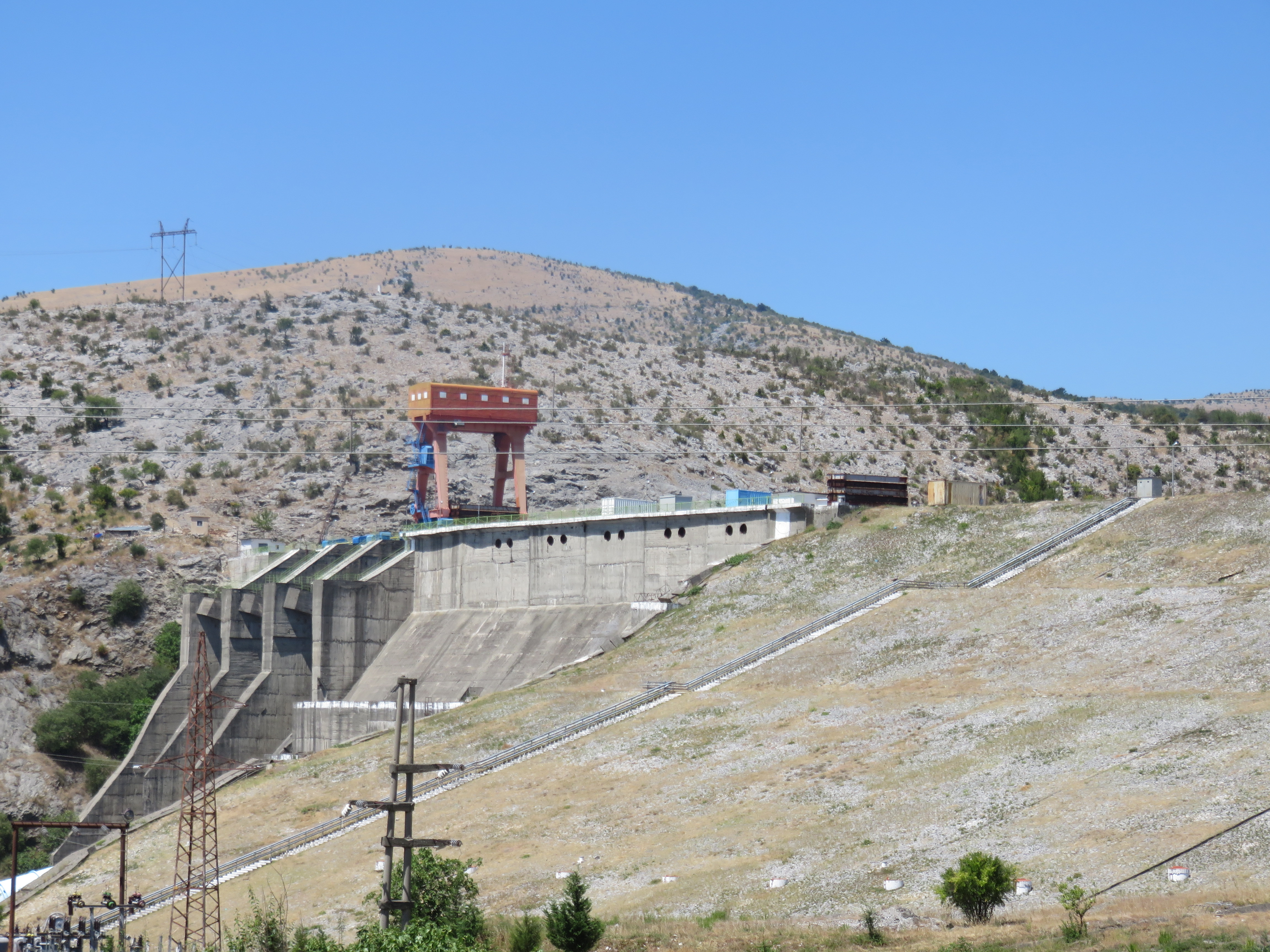
Qyrsaq dam, one of the three dams of Vau i Dejës Hydroelectric Power Station

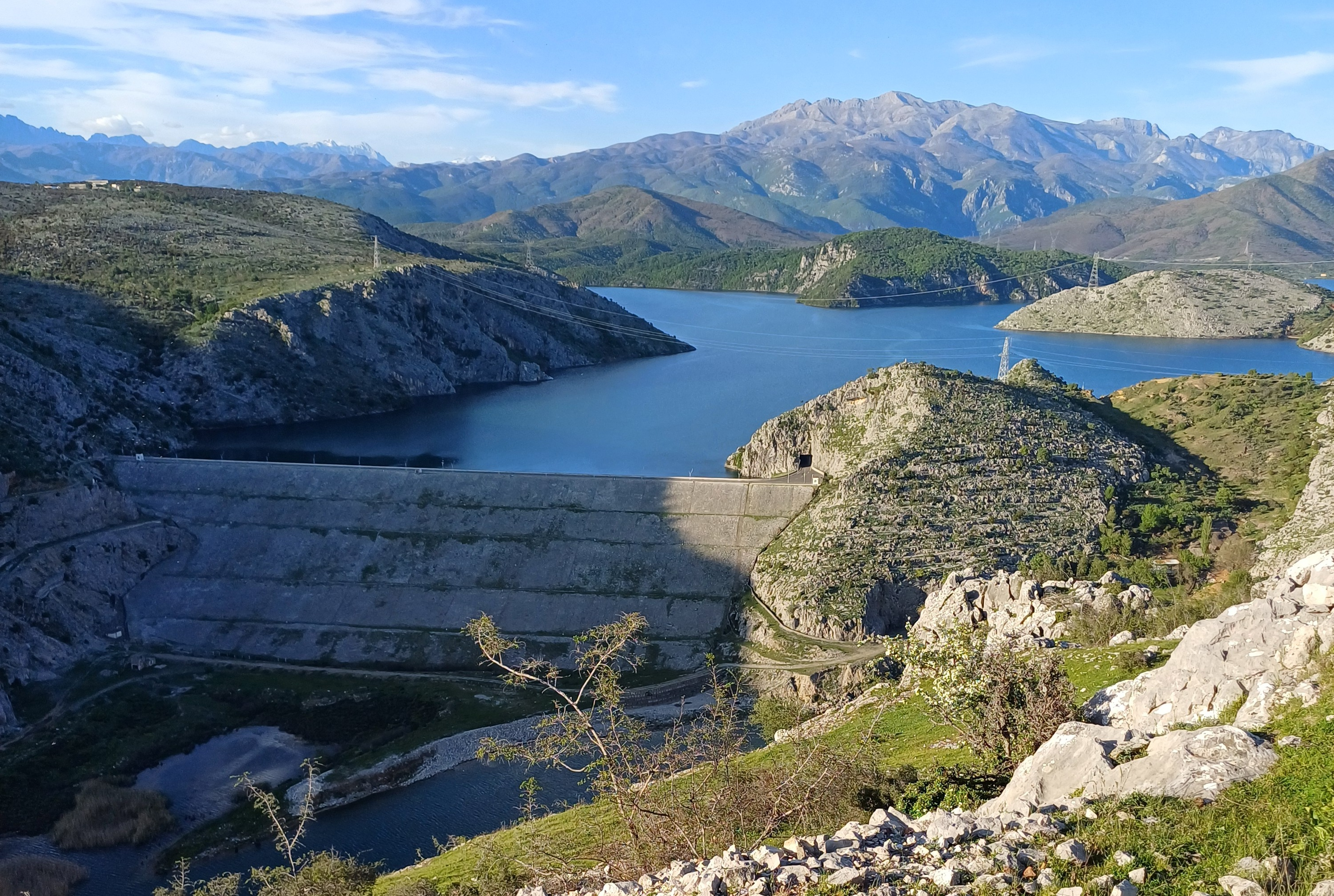
Zadeja dam, one of the three dams of the Vau i Dejës Hydroelectric Power Station

The dam is located on Vau i Dejës gorge, 18 km (11 mi) away from Shkodër, being 75 m (246 ft) at its tallest. Besides electricity generation, it is also important for its water discharges, which have a major effect on flooding in the lowlands of Lezha and Shkodër. It is the lower part of the Drin river cascade. Vau i Dejës Lake, the dam's reservoir, has a maximum volume of 580,000,000 m^{3} (2.0×10^{10} cu ft), although its active volume is 263,000,000 m^{3} (9.3×10^{9} cu ft), or possibly 0.68 km^{3} (0.16 cu mi). It has a surface area of 26 km^{2} (10 sq mi) according to some estimates, and 25 km^{2} (9.7 sq mi) according to others. The station's safe maximum flow for a 1-in-10,000-year event, a standard measure used in risk assessment, is 10,000 m^{3}/s (21,000,000 cu ft/min) and its total discharge capacity is 7,500 m^{3}/s (16,000,000 cu ft/min), or 7,740 m^{3}/s (16,400,000 cu ft/min). The plant operates five vertical Francis turbines, each with 50 MW of power, for a total installed power of 250 MW. To connect with a substation, the station has synchronous generators that use three-phase electric power and transformers; it also contains auxiliary devices and control systems. Annually, on average, it produces 1,000 gigawatt-hours (GWh) of electricity, or 870 GWh. Originally, Vau i Dejës HPP employed Chinese technology and equipment, but these were replaced with mechanical equipment from Andritz AG and electrical and control installations from Alstom between 2003 and 2007.

Instead of solid waste pollution, which is more prevalent upstream, wastewater and flooding, caused by numerous, year-round rainfalls, are Vau i Dejës's main problems. In January and December 2010 the area experienced its largest flood to date; the water loads in Buna were 3,600 m^{3}/s (130,000 cu ft/s) and 4,000 m^{3}/s (140,000 cu ft/s). Regularly, overflows in local bodies of water are caused by heavy, prolonged rainfall in the winter and snowmelt. These floods, caused by the Vau i Dejës HPP's floodgates and the nonuse of the drainage system (in addition to dams upstream), have prevented the deposition of sediments and solid materials brought by the river, resulting in coastal erosion. The area around Vau i Dejës HPP is sparsely populated as of 2026, yet road deterioration has resulted in companies throwing waste into the Vau i Dejës lake and local rivers. Due to a lack of construction, chemically inert waste has decreased.

There are few residential centres or businesses along its reservoir.

In 2022, Belinda Balluku, the Albanian Minister of Infrastructure and Energy, said there were plans to develop a wind power plant within Vau i Dejës HPP, in addition to solar projects. Balkan Green Energy News argued that combining wind and solar was particularly effective at reducing intermittency of power generation: wind turbines generate power at night and in the winter, when solar outputs are lower. In 2023, the project was described as the potential first sufficiently-large-scale hybrid plant combining solar, hydro, and wind generation, for utility usage, pending completion. At the time, hybrid power plants were relatively new but increasing in prevalence. Most other hybrid power plants used fossil fuels, but plans for integration of other renewable sources and batteries were on the rise.

Privately owned hydropower units (Ashta 1 and 2) are located beneath Vau i Dejës HPP.

In 2023, a technical report published by the Albanian Power Corporation reported that the equipment was outdated, and some of it was in an extremely poor condition. While it had not yet caused any problems, it could fail and cause interruptions in electricity generation in the future. Rehabilitation was recommended to combat further increase in risk, which led to the undertaking of the CONNECTA2 project in 2025, with the goal of creating a plan for rehabilitation. A rehabilitation is predicted to bring in 5.4 million euros in additional annual revenue, and generate 74 GWh more per year.

=== Floating photovoltaics ===
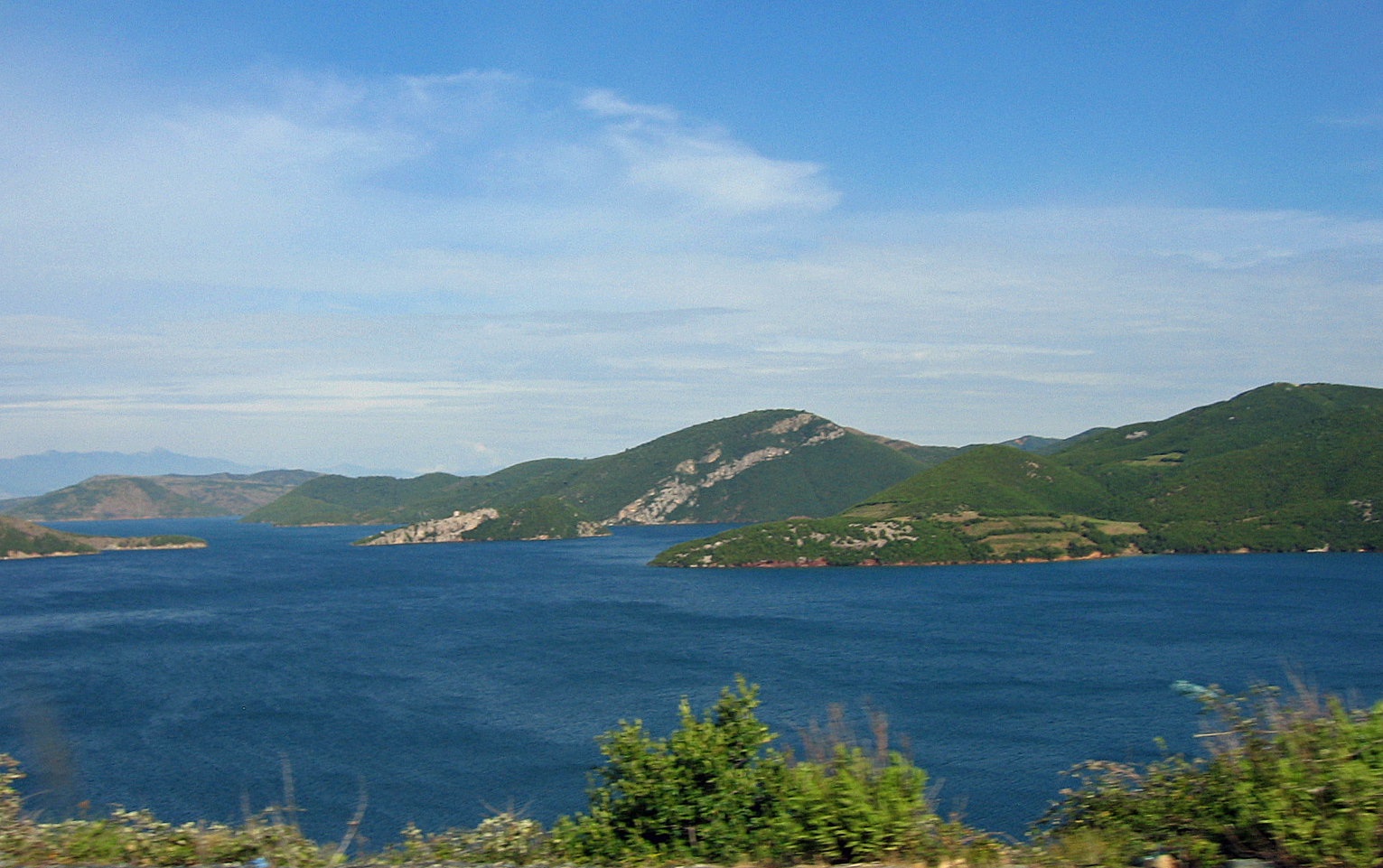
Lake Vau i Dejës

In 2018, the Albanian Power Corporation submitted a proposal to construct a 12.9 MW floating photovoltaics plant, on the Vau i Dejës stations's reservoir, to the Ministry of Transport and Infrastructure. In 2020, the European Bank for Reconstruction and Development considered giving a loan of either €9.5 million, according to PV Magazine; or of €9.75 million, according to Balkan Green Energy News; to the Albanian Power Corporation for the construction of the plant. Ultimately, the European Bank approved a €9.1 million loan in April 2021. The lender said that the construction of floating solar would decrease Albania's reliance on hydroelectric revenue. The loan was the first of its kind from an international financial institution.

The new floating photovoltaics would produce €13.94 million worth of electricity, and would "strengthen [the station's] operational and financial performance" according to Balkan Green Energy News. The approval date for the loan was scheduled to be 21 October 2020. The photovoltaics, covering 11.8 ha (29 acres) of the reservoir, would prevent algae growth, reduce water evaporation, and improve water quality. At the time, an Environmental and social due diligence (ESDD) was ongoing to determine possible environmental impacts. According to Balkan Green Energy News, the new addition was a part of Albania's trend of energy diversification, driven by energy vulnerability to droughts. According to Energy Industry Review, this development was a larger part of Albania's ambition to develop its solar capacity, along with the 140 MW Karavasta project and the 100 MW Spitalle project. It was also a part of the commercialization of the Albanian Power Corporation.

The completed solar panels at Qyrsaq, one of the three dams of the Vau i Dejës reservoir, have a capacity of 5.1 MW and an annual output of 7 GWh. The solar unit occupies 2.5 hectares (6.2 acres) of the total 3.2 ha (7.9 acres) available on the dam. In 2021, the Albanian Power Corporation also stated that there were plans to install photovoltaic panels at Zadeja dam, and other buildings in Vau i Dejës HPP. As of 2023, it was planned to be 8.25 MW in capacity and to span 40 ha (99 acres) of the total 48.6 ha (120 acres) available. They also said that they would utilise both ground-mounted and floating solar panels. Hybrid power plants, like Vau i Dejës, provide a stabler energy supply to clients. Consequently, grid and storage costs for investors decrease. Hydropower plants, like Vau i Dejës HPP, have significant space for photovoltaic installation. A bid for project design, engineering, construction, commissioning and a two-year maintenance was started, ending on July 3 2023. The Albanian Power Corporation valued the investment at €7.6 million, excluding value-added tax. The contractors would be responsible for installing a control and monitoring system for the solar power plants on two of Vau i Dejës HPP's dams. SENA will only be responsible for future photovoltaic projects. In 2024, Masdar was chosen to be the contractor, thereby creating a joint venture with the Albanian Power Corporation.

In total, the floating solar project would be the largest in Europe, as of 2023, with 12.9 MW of peak capacity and 17.6 GWh of average annual output. It would cover 0.45%, or 11 ha (27 acres), of Lake Vau i Dejës.

== See also ==
- List of power stations in Albania
