= List of power stations in Albania =

This article lists the power stations in Albania. There were 144 active power stations operating in the country in 2016. The table below lists only stations that have at least 10 MW of power capacity.

== Hydroelectric power stations ==
Station	Site	Capacity	Output (2016)	Operator	Status	Ref
HEC Koman	Koman	600 MW	2,134,357 MWh		Active	
HEC Fierzë	Fierzë	500 MW	1,851,138 MWh		Active	
HEC Vau i Dejës	Vau i Dejës	260 MW			Active	
HEC Skavicë	Skavicë	120 MW or 210 MW			Proposed	
HEC Moglicë	Moglicë	184 MW			Active	
HEC Kukel	Kukel	114 MW			Active	
HEC Kalivaç	Kalivaç	93.3 MW			u/c	
HEC Fang	Fang	74.6 MW			Active	
HEC Banjë	Klos	70 MW			Active	
HEC Ashtë 1, 2	Shkodër	52.3 MW			Active	
HEC Qarrishte	Qarrishte	37.5 MW			u/c	
HEC Peshqesh	Peshqesh	27.9 MW			Active	
HEC Bistricë 1, 2	Bistricë	27.5 MW			Active	
HEC Ulëz	Ulëz	25.2 MW			Active	
HEC Shkopet	Milot	24 MW			Active	
HEC Gostimë	Gostimë	21.5 MW			u/c	
HEC Stavec	Stavec	20.8 MW			u/c	
HEC Lurë 1, 2, 3	Dibër	16.2 MW			Active	
HEC Bele 1, 2	Bele	16 MW			Active	
HEC Prellë	Prellë	14.7 MW			Active	
HEC Shoshan	Shoshan	14.4 MW			Active	
HEC Vlushë	Çorovodë	14.2 MW			Active	
HEC Sllabinjë	Korçë	13.8 MW			u/c	
HEC Lapaj	Kukës	13.6 MW			Active	
HEC Pobreg	Kukës	12.3 MW			Active	
HEC Darsi	Darsi	10.9 MW			u/c	
HEC Tërvol	Gramsh	10.6 MW			Active	
HEC Lumzi	Lumzi	10.5 MW			u/c	
HEC Martanesh	Bulqizë	10.5 MW			Active	
'HEC Topojan	Topojan	10.2 MW			u/c	

== Solar power ==
As of 2022, there were 16 solar projects totaling 570 MW planned in Albania.

Station	Site	Capacity	Output	Operator	Status	Ref
Karavasta solar power plant		140 MW			Active 2023	

== Thermal power stations ==
Station	Site	Capacity	Output (2024)	Operator	Status	Ref
Temporary Power Solution	Vlora	100 MW	100 MWh	RENCO	Active 2024	
TEC Vlora	Vlora	97 MW		TEC	u/m	
