= Kuman =

Kuman may refer to:

- Kuman, Albania, a village in the Roskovec municipality, Fier County, Albania
- Küman, a municipality in Azerbaijan
- Cumans, an ancient people
- Kuman language (disambiguation), several unrelated languages

== See also ==
- Kuman Thong, a Thai household divinity
