= Renewable energy in Albania =

Albania electricity production 1980–2019

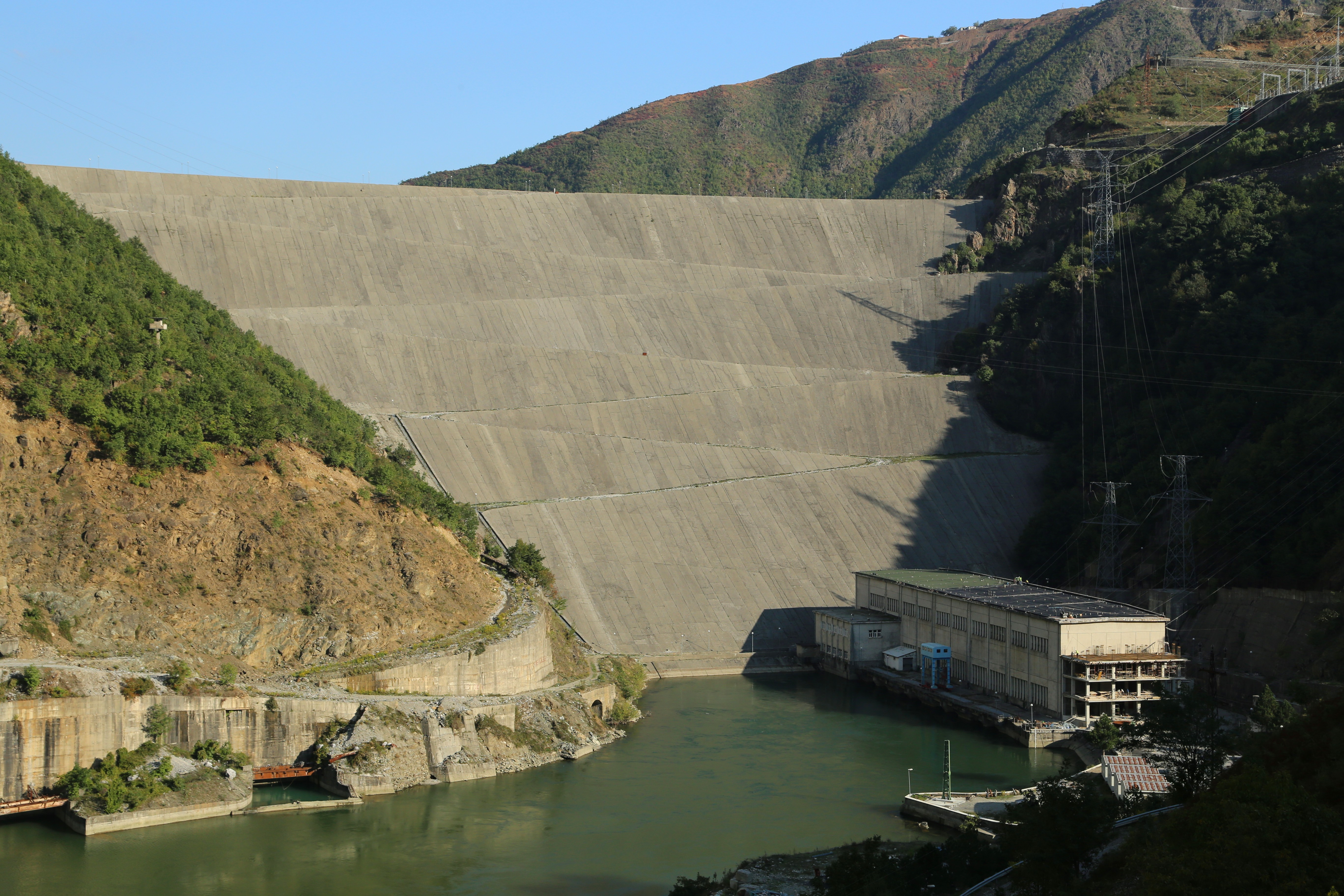
Fierza Hydroelectric Power Station

Renewable energy in Albania includes biomass, geothermal, hydropower, solar, and wind energy. Albania relies mostly on hydroelectric resources, therefore, it has difficulties and shortages when water levels are low. The climate in Albania is Mediterranean, so it possesses considerable potential for solar energy production. Mountain elevations provide good areas for wind projects. There is also potentially usable geothermal energy because Albania has natural wells.

== Hydro power ==
Albania is the biggest producer of hydroelectric energy in the world by percentage (90% as of 2011) and by own production (100%). Albania aims to increase its hydroelectric energy production to 100%. Some of the projects underway include Skavica, which generates up to 350 MW, Devolli which generates up to 400 MW, Vjosa which generates up to 400 MW, Kalivaci and Ashta which both generate up to 48 MW, and Valbona and Tropojë, which both generate up to 40 MW.

Albanian has more potential for hydroelectric energy, but the decision to build more dams is not an easy one, since the country remains steadfast in safeguarding its natural beauty. Moreover, the production profile in the country does not always align with the consumption profile; electricity demand in Albania peaks during spring and summer seasons, primarily due to tourism, when rainfall is lower and the dams have less water. In 2022, the net domestic production was 7,002 GWh, while the total consumption was 7,924 GWh; Albania had to import approximately 922 GWh to meet domestic demand. That year they imported 3,044 GWh during dry seasons and exported 2,123 GWh during rainy seasons. Albania is trying to become more energy independent by diversifying electricity generation.

== Solar power ==
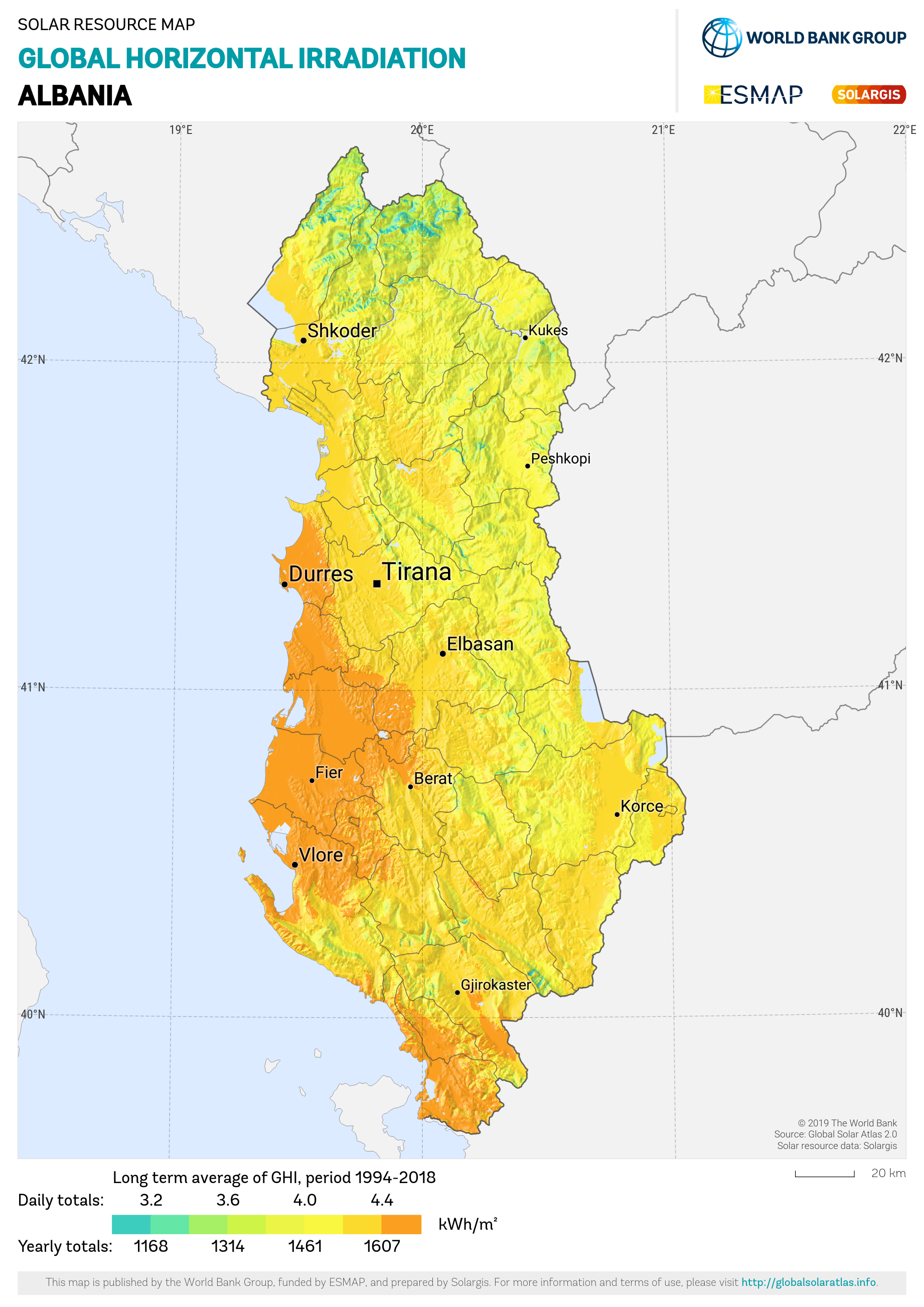
Solar radiation map of Albania

The United Nations Development Program is supporting a program to install solar panels in Albania. The program has used $2.75 million to support the installation of 75,000 m^{2} (810,000 sq ft) of solar panels. By 2010, 10,700 m^{2} (115,000 sq ft) of solar panels were installed and by 2014 the target had been met. There are 50,000 m^{2} (540,000 sq ft) of solar panels expected to be installed by 2015. Albania gets about 2100–2700 hours of sunshine in a year so it has a great potential for solar energy. Solar energy is easily accessible since most energy comes directly or indirectly from the sun. It could be used for heating and lighting homes, commercial, and industrial buildings.

In late 2023 the 140MW Karavasta solar power plant was completed, having taken Voltalia of France 15 months to build, it is the largest in Albania to date. A 100 MW solar power project called Spitalla in Durrës area is planned to be built next.

== Wind power ==
Albania has enormous potential for electric energy from wind power. Notwithstanding the total licenses distributed throughout the country amounting to approximately 2548 MW with an energy generation potential around 5.7 TWh/year, yet no wind farm projects have been completed, and very few are currently in the pipeline in some way. The coastal lowlands and Southern, Eastern, and Northern Albania mountains are excellent areas for wind turbines. The wind speed is 8–9 m/s in many areas of Albania.

The first wind power auction took place in summer 2023 with three bidders awarded 222 MW capacity.

== Geothermal energy ==
Geothermal energy could also be used in Albania. It comes from warm water sources from underground soil. Geothermal energy comes from the heat generated by the Earth. There are some spots called hot spots that generate more heat than others. There are natural wells near Albania's border with Greece. This energy could be used for heating purposes. Geothermal energy in Albania is under study and there have been no attempts to use it yet.

== Laws and petitions ==
The Power Sector Law No.9073, approved in 2004, gives permits to construct new hydropower plants.

The Concession Law No.9663, approved in 2006, attracts private investments in hydropower plants.

Albania placed a tariff for existing and new hydropower plants in 2007.

The Electricity Market Model was approved in 2008. It facilitates purchases between independent power producers and small power producers. It allows producers to sell electricity to all markets at agreed terms. Non-household customers can become eligible consumers and choose their energy suppliers. This helps renewable energy to be more accessible.

== See also ==
- List of power stations in Albania
- Renewable energy in the European Union
- Renewable energy by country
