= Lake Koman Ferry =

Ferry service in Albania

Trageti i Komanit
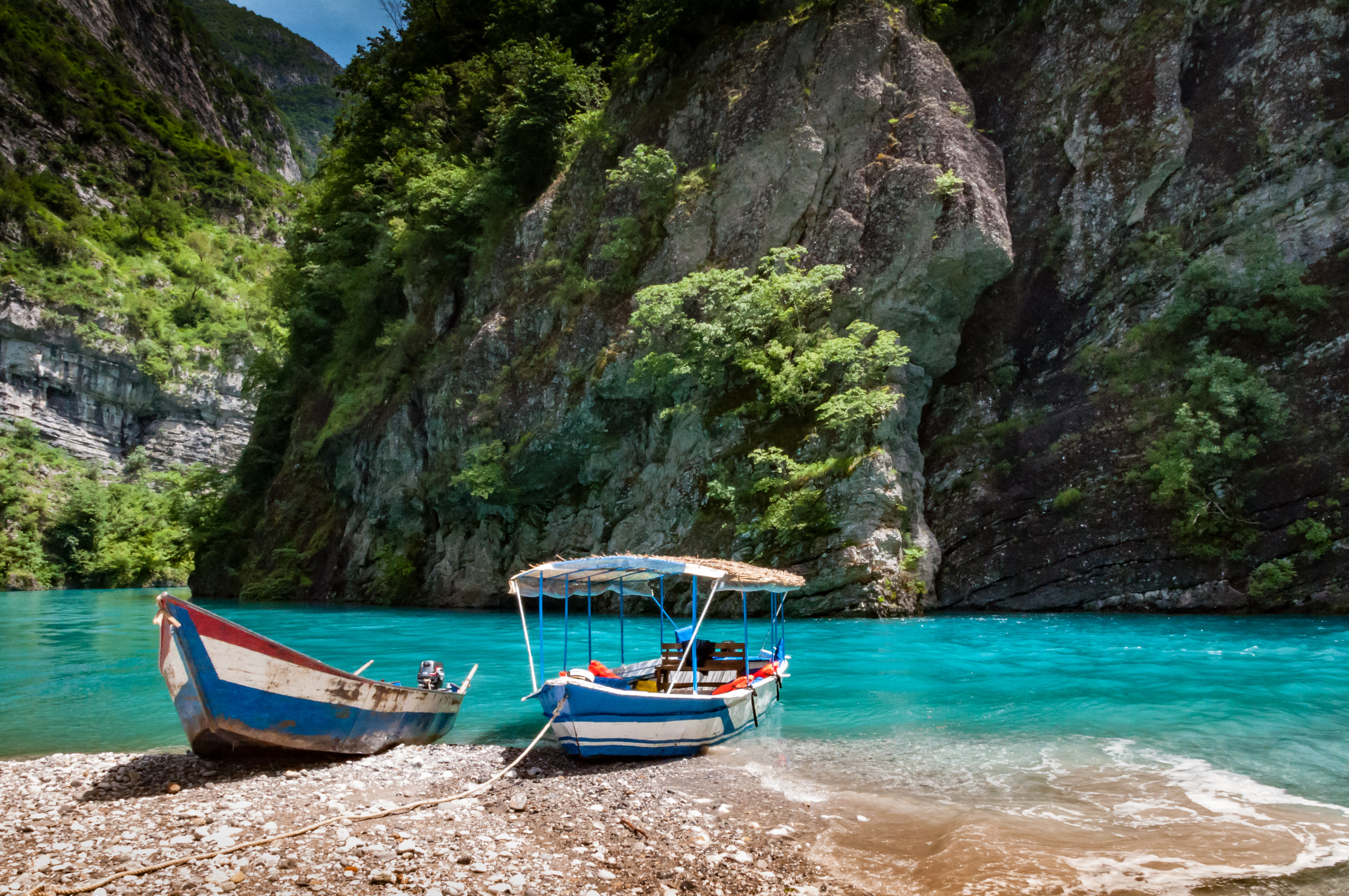
- Locale: Fierze, Albania; Koman, Albania
- Waterway: Koman Reservoir
- Transit type: Passenger ferry
- Operator: Rozafa ferry, SAHHILBA/Alpin, Mario Molla, Vellezerit Marku (Berisha/Dragobia),
- Began operation: 1984
- No. of lines: 4
- No. of vessels: ~10
- No. of terminals: 2

Lake Koman Ferry (Albanian: Trageti i Komanit) is a passenger ferry service operated by several local companies along the Koman Reservoir (also known as Koman Lake) in Northern Albania.

The line operates between Koman, near the Koman Hydroelectric Power Station, and Fierzë near the Fierza Hydroelectric Power Station. The line is known for its scenic views of the mountain gorges, unscheduled stops along the way for serving locals, and animals being fitted on board up to full capacity.

== History ==
Following the construction of the dam and inundation of the area, a ferry service was established to serve the local population. Since the 2000s, the area has become a growing tourist destination. As a result, the old car ferry ship Dardania underwent a complete makeover and began regular trips in May 2015 with the new name Alpin Ferry. Between June 2012 and April 2014, the Jezerca X car ferry was no longer running. The new A1 highway connecting the Albanian coast with Kukes and Kosovo made it redundant and allowed for the Dardania ship makeover. Presently, several private companies offer custom tour packages with acceptable vessels.

Also, there is the Dragobia Boat (the cabin of which was converted from a bus), which has been operating in the lake since 1994. Now they also have the Berisha Ferry, which can carry up to 5 cars.

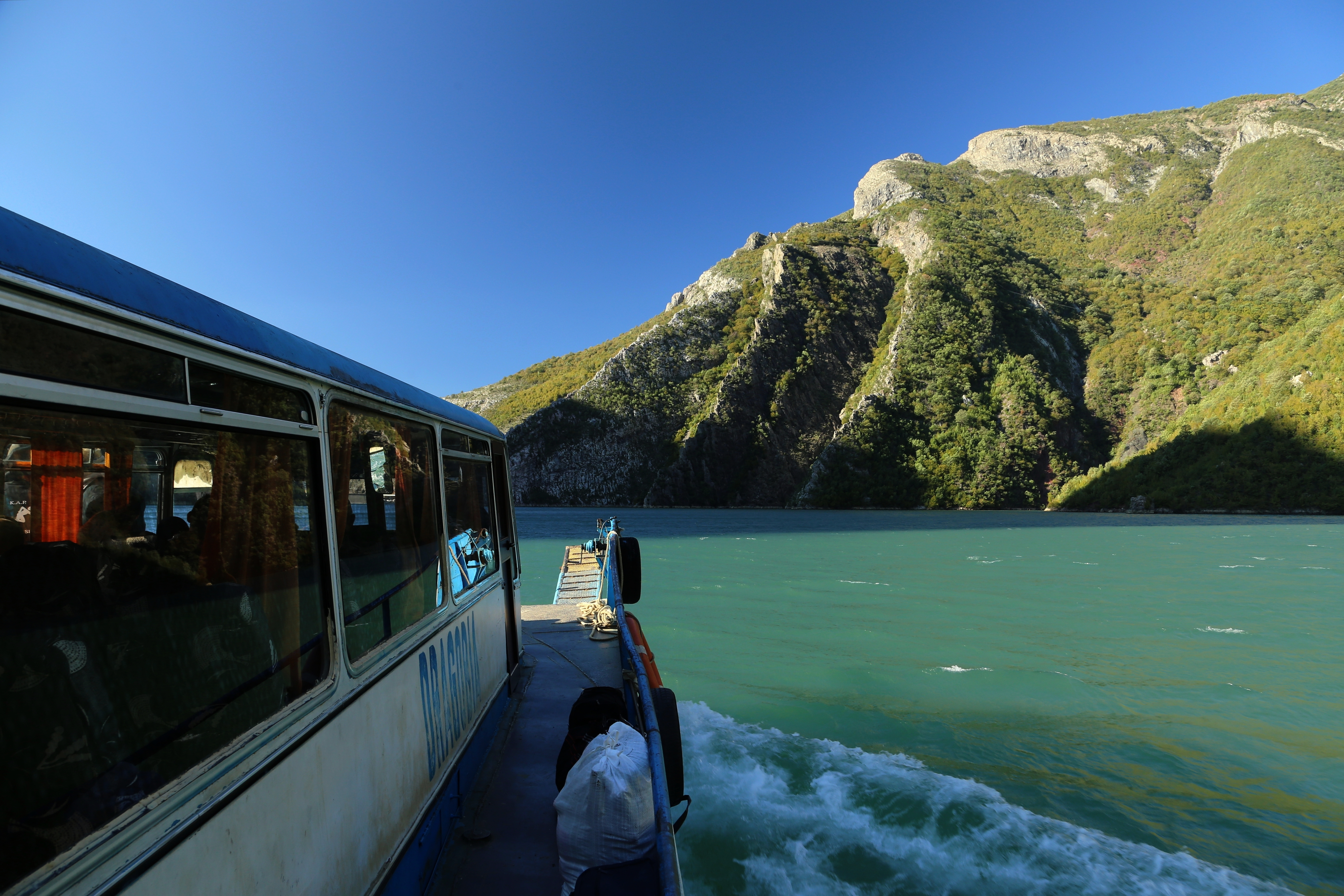
Bus-boat ferry

== Schedule ==
In May 2015, the revamped car ferry ship was re-introduced with daily service on a new timetable. The journey takes two hours. Other ferry services such as Berisha have an inverted schedule. There are schedule changes in the winter season to accommodate lower ridership.

== Transportation ==
Furgons (minibuses) serve the area and are usually located at the ferry docking stations. Furgons depart from Shkoder in the morning.

== Gallery ==
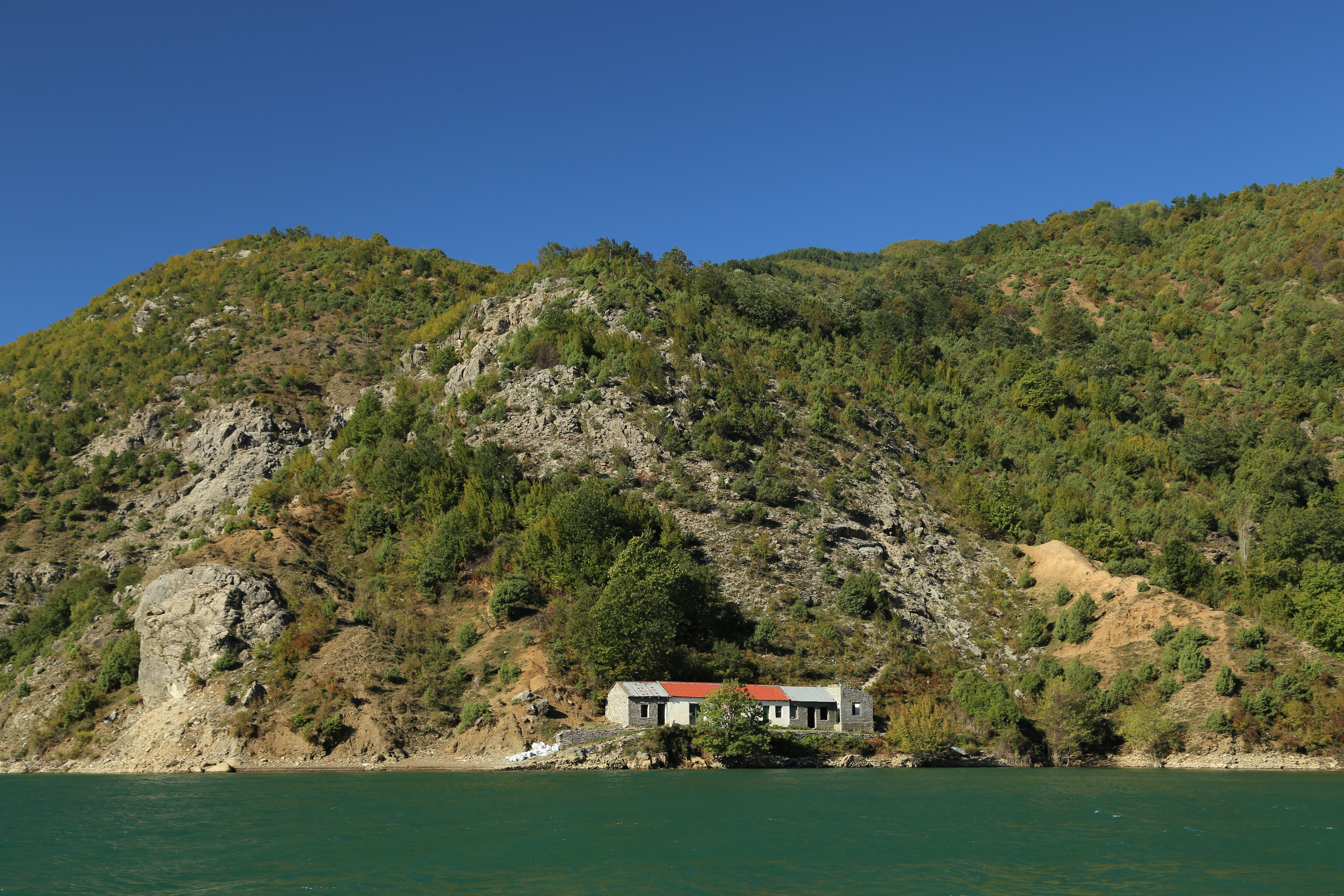

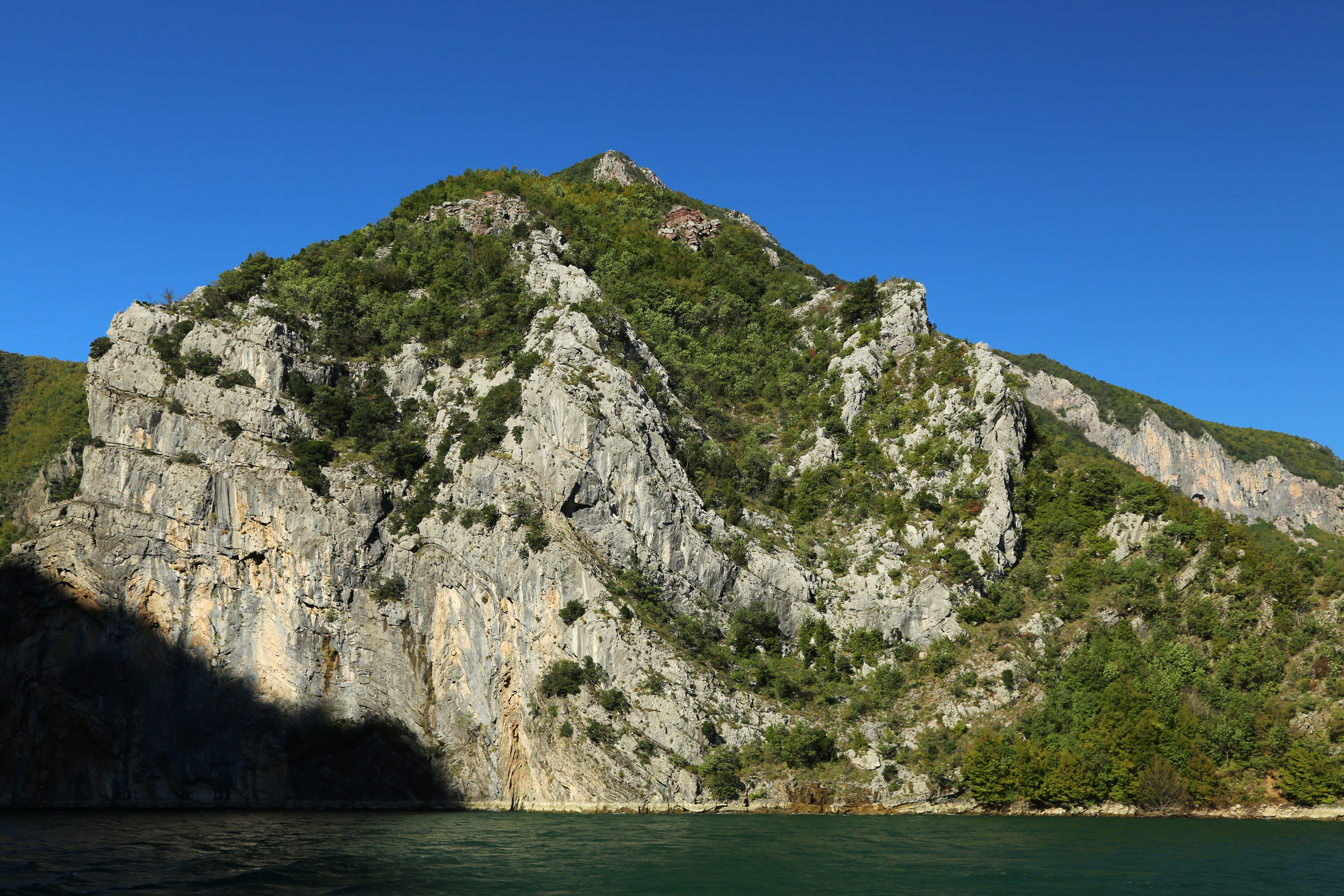

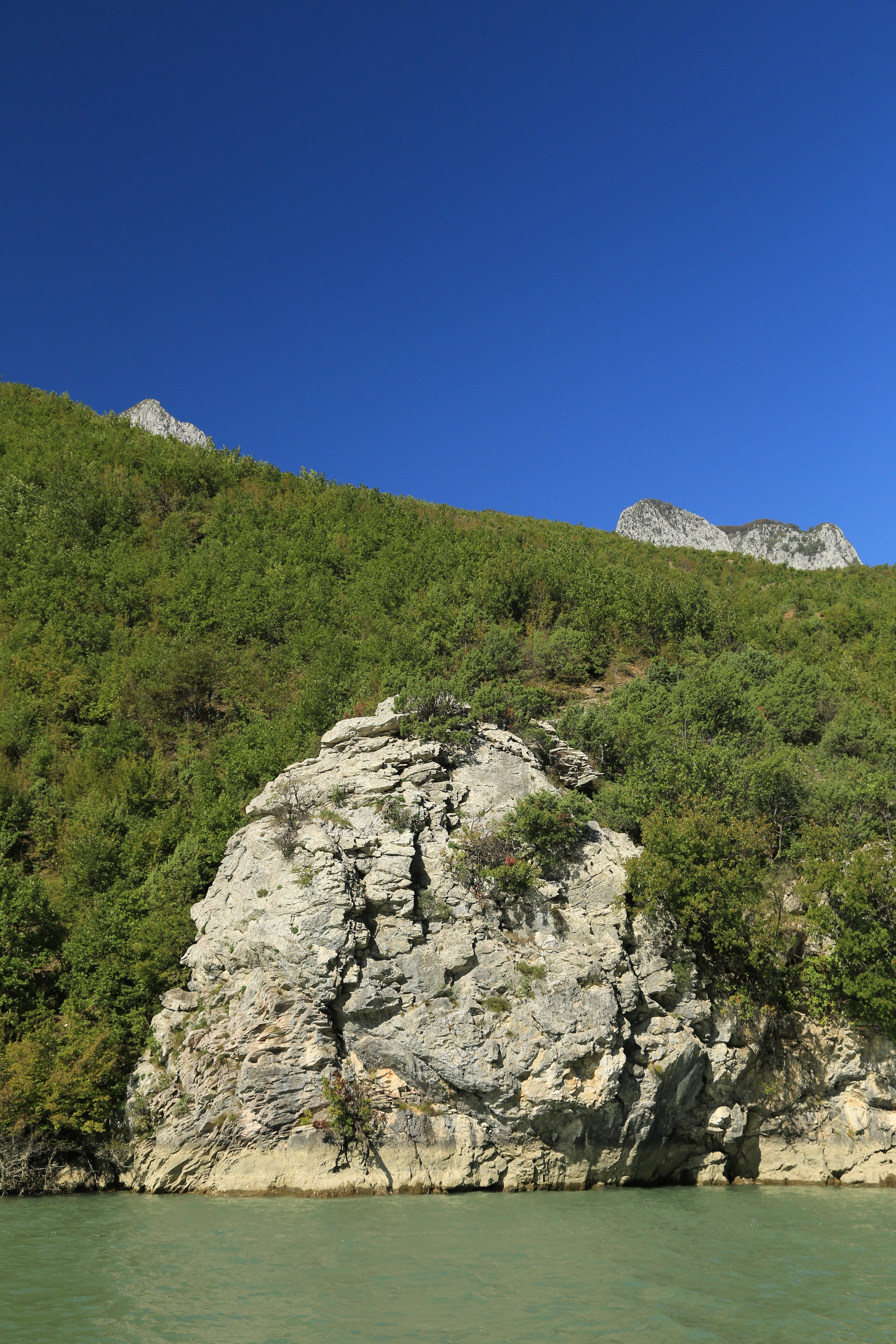

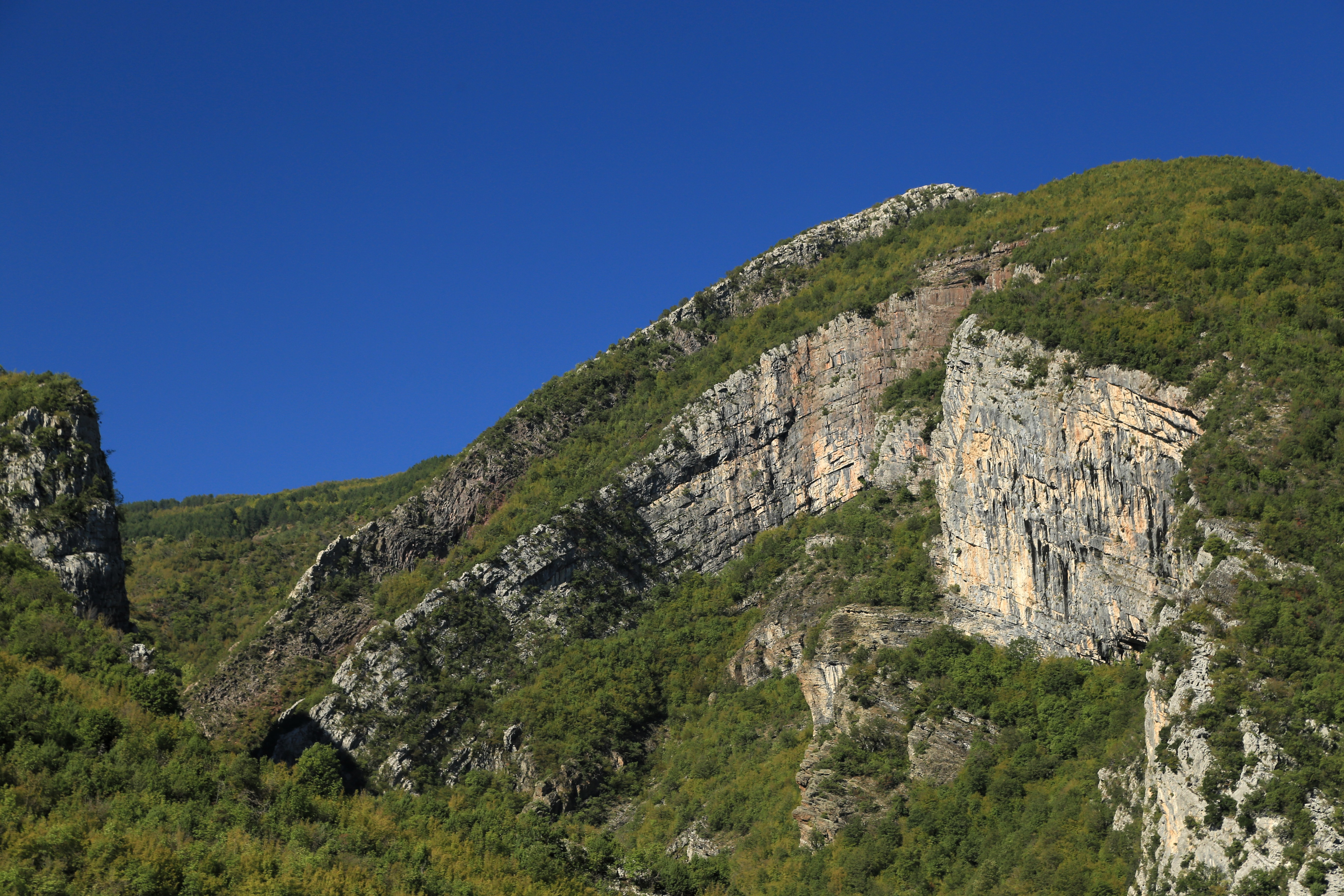

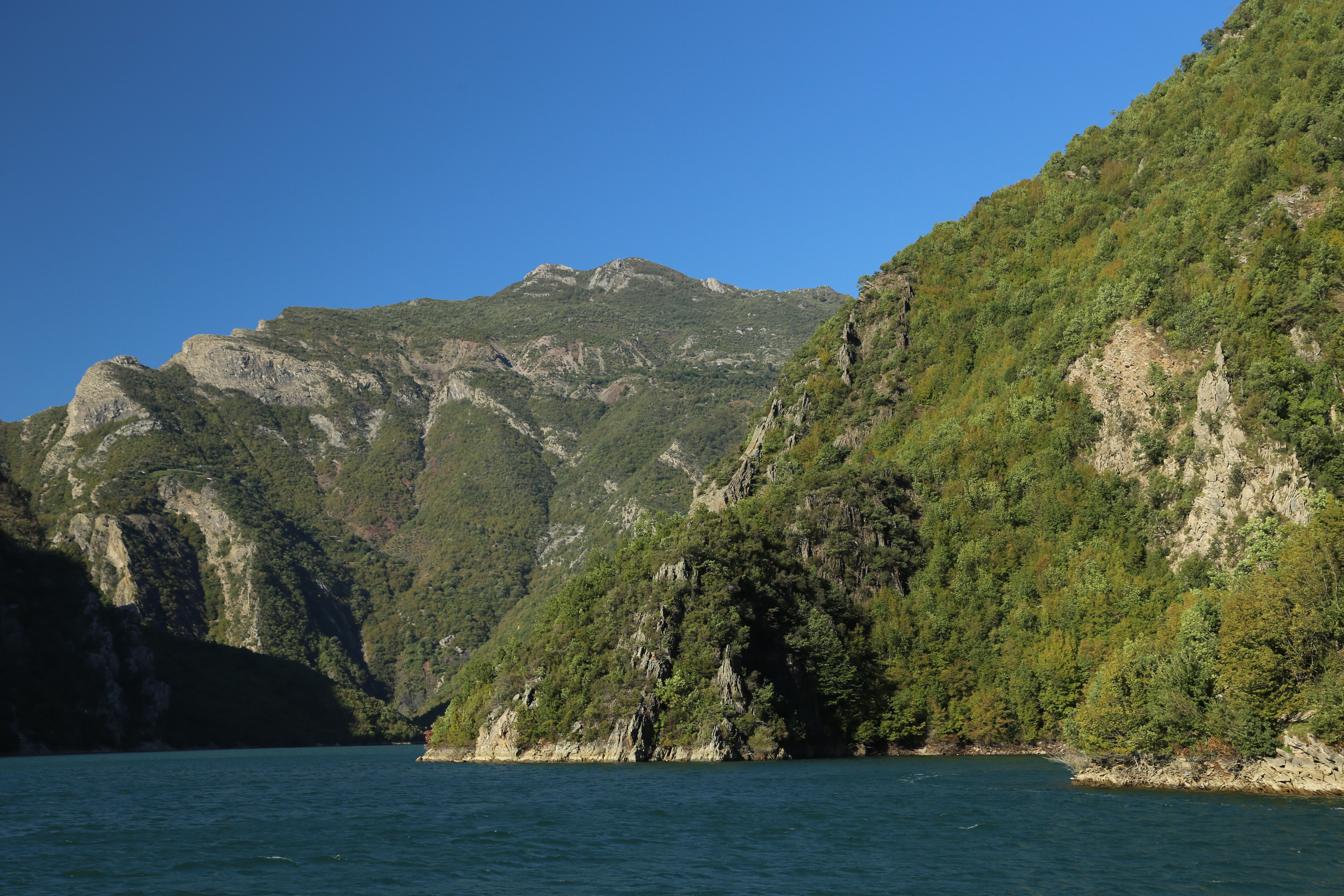
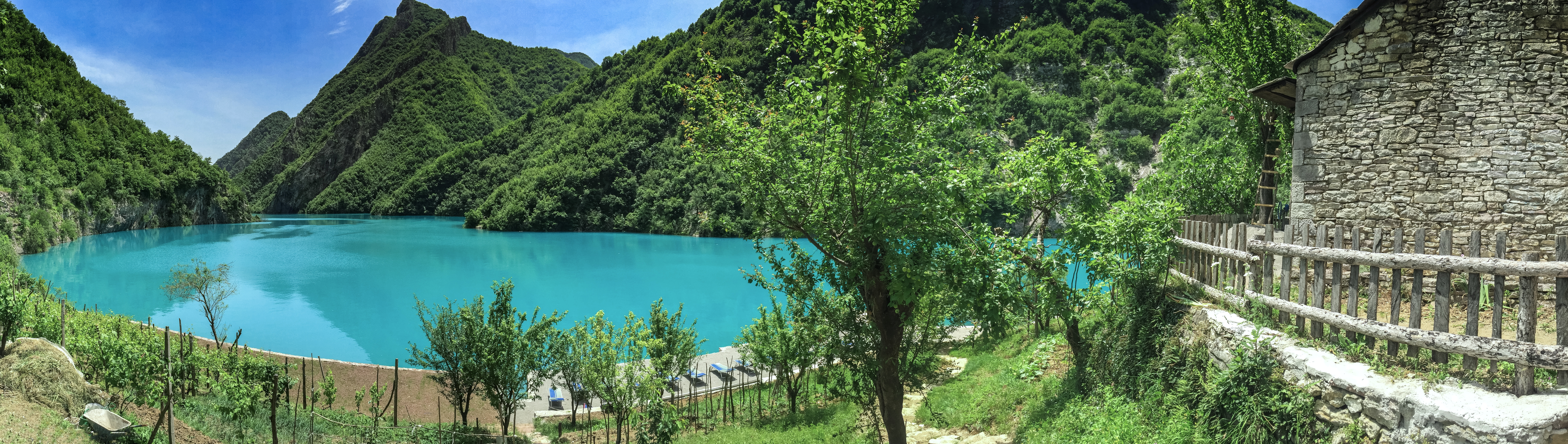

== See also ==
- Geography of Albania
- Albanian Alps
- Tourism in Albania
- Transport in Albania
