= Shala (river) =

River in Albania

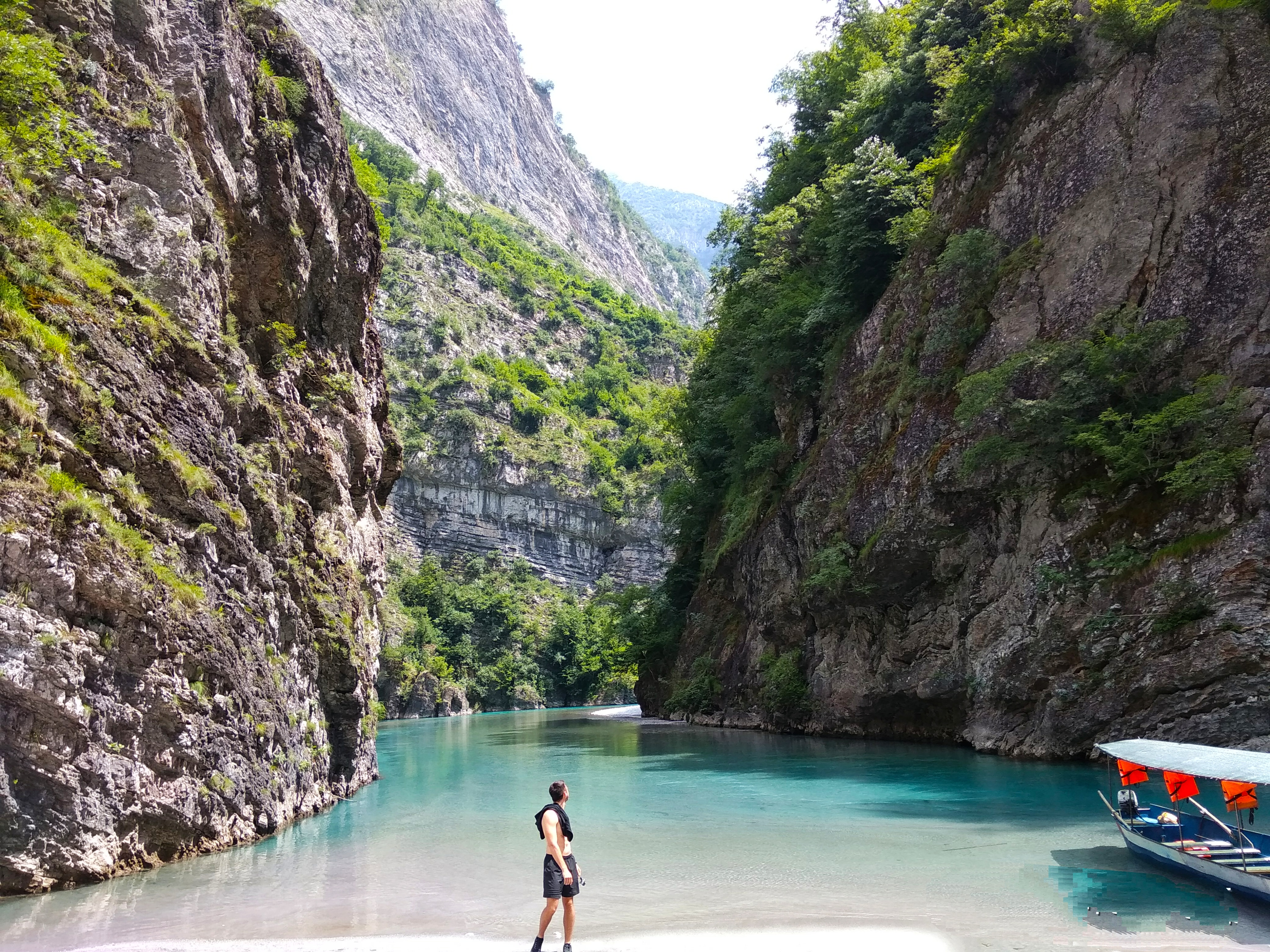

Location
- Country: Albania

Physical characteristics
- Source: Okol, Theth
  - location: Shkodër County
  - coordinates: 42°25′18″N 19°45′29″E
  - elevation: 950 m (3,120 ft)
- Mouth: Lake Koman
  - coordinates: 42°12′5″N 19°49′1″E
  - elevation: 175 m (574 ft)
- Length: 36 km (22 mi)
- Basin size: 269 km^{2} (104 sq mi)

Basin features
- Progression: Drin→ Adriatic Sea

The Shalë (Albanian definite form: Shala) or Lumi i Shalës is a river flowing inside the Albanian Alps in northern Albania. Its source is near the village of Theth, close to the border with Montenegro in the Alps of Albania National Park. It drains the central part of the alps to the south and flows into the artificially dammed Drin as lake Koman near the village Telum.

The Shalë flows generally south through the municipal units Shalë, Shosh and Temal and has a length of 37 km. It springs at the source of Shtraza at the top of Theth village, at the foot of Radohina, from where it descends down through the valley of Shala, Thethi, Ndërlysa and Musha, from Breg-Lumi to Porta e Shalës (Gorge of Rrshqëm), through Lotaj and in the valley of Shoshi, discharging into lake Koman. It is a mountain river with an average drop of 22 meters in one kilometer.

Shala River is distinguished by its crystalline water, with an average annual flow of about 34 m³ / sec. The maximum inflows reach in November with 52m³ / sec, while the minimum inflows in August in which it reaches 9m³ / sec. It is rich in fish, but the most widespread is trout.

The blue water and surrounding steep cliffs characterize this river. The river has become a tourist destination for both foreign and local visitors, who describe it as a notable attraction in Koman and Albania.

== See also ==
- Geography of Albania
- Northern Mountain Range
- Rivers of Albania
