= Lake Koman =

Reservoir on the Drin River in northern Albania

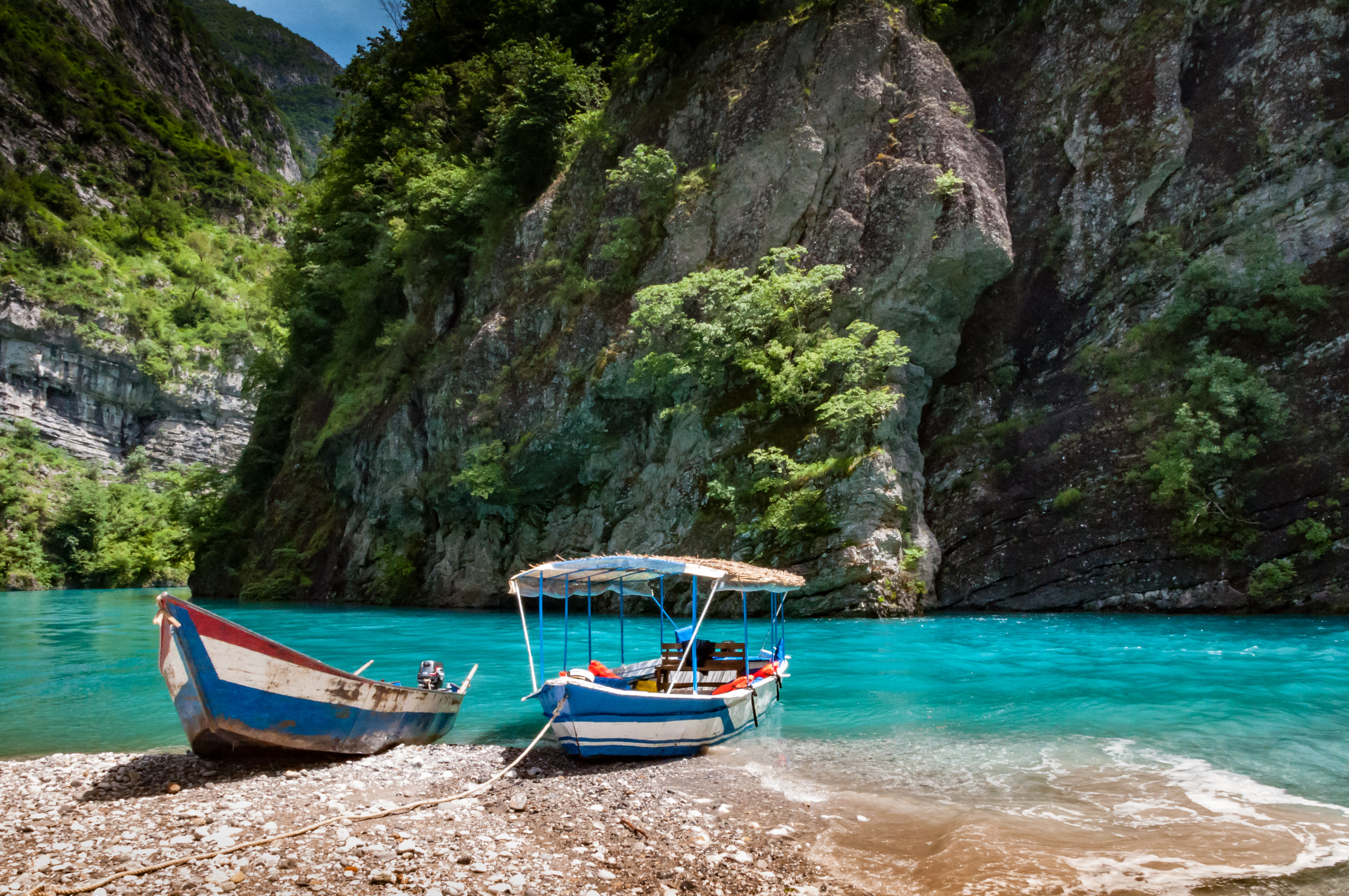
- Lake Koman

- Location within Albania Location within Balkans
- Location: Kukës, Shkodër
- Coordinates: 42°13′07″N 19°53′56″E
- Primary inflows: Drin, Shala, Valbona
- Primary outflows: Drin
- Basin countries: Albania
- Max. length: 34 km (21 mi)
- Surface area: 13 km^{2} (5.0 sq mi)
- Max. depth: 34 m (112 ft)
- Surface elevation: 170 m (560 ft)
- Settlements: Fierzë, Koman

Lake Koman (Albanian: Liqeni i Komanit) is a reservoir on the Drin River in northern Albania. It is surrounded by dense forested hills, vertical slopes, deep gorges, and a narrow valley, completely taken up by the river. Besides the Drin, it is fed by the Shala and Valbona Rivers. The lake stretches in an area of 34 km^{2} (13 sq mi), its width being 400 m (0.25 mi). The narrowest gorge, which is surrounded by vertical canyon walls, is more than 50 m (0.031 mi) wide. The reservoir was constructed between 1979 and 1988 by the Koman Hydroelectric Power Station near the village of Koman with a height of 115 m (377 ft).

The combination of specific topography and hydrological conditions have contributed to the formation of different habitats. The golden jackal, red fox, european badger, eurasian otter, beech marten, european polecat are the primary predatory mammals. A high number of bird species have been observed in the region, including the common kingfisher, common quail, grey heron, eurasian wryneck, great spotted woodpecker and black-headed gull.

The Lake Koman Ferry operates daily on the lake from Koman to Fierza. The ferry connects the city of Bajram Curri to the region of Tropojë. The journey takes about two and a half hours and is also popular with the foreign tourists. Smaller boats bring people and goods to remote villages, which are often far away from the lake, but can only be reached by water.

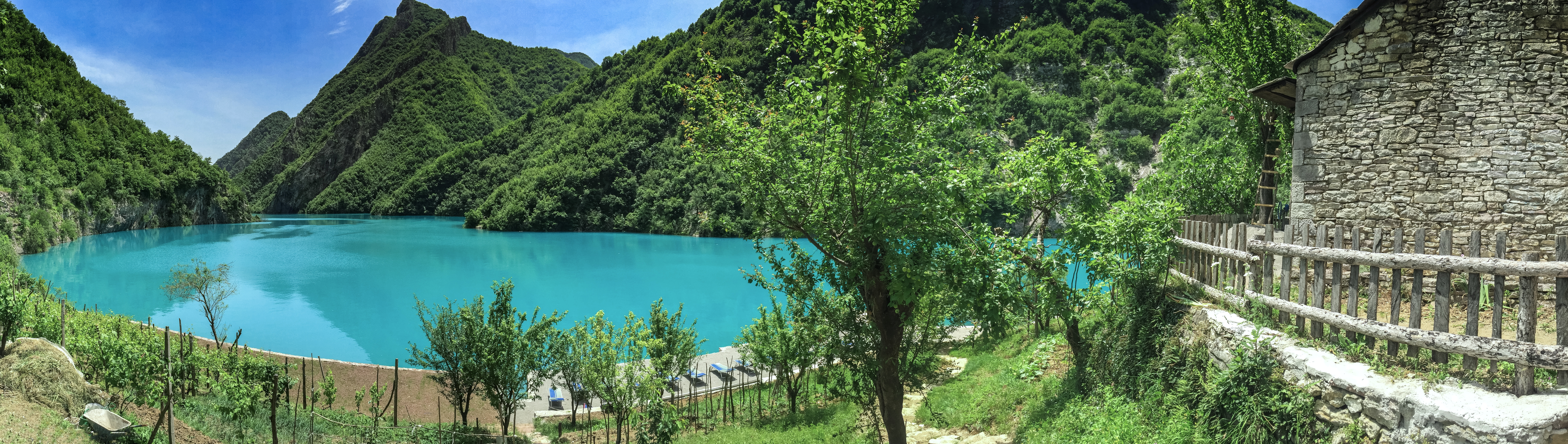
The vertical canyons of the lake are sometimes comparable to the Scandinavian fjords.

== See also ==
- Geography of Albania
- Lakes of Albania
