= Martin Camaj =

Albanian writer (1925–1992)

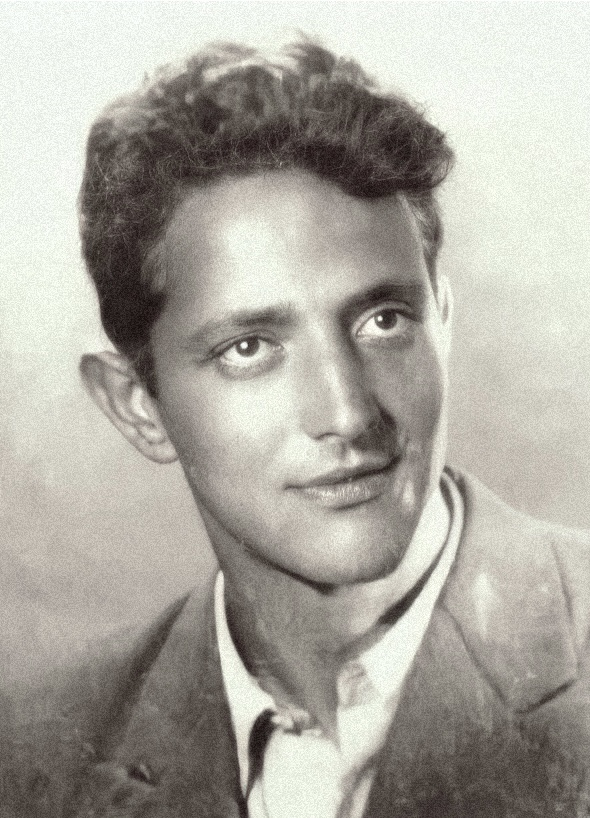
- A young Martin Camaj, 1940s
- Born: 21 July 1925; Temal, Albania
- Died: 12 March 1992 (aged 66); Lenggries, Germany
- Occupations: Linguist, writer and folklorist
- Writing career
- Language: Albanian
- Notable works: Rrathë (Circles), Nji fyell ndër male (A flute in mountains), Kanga e Vërrinit (Song of the lowland pastures)

Martin Camaj (21 July 1925 – 12 March 1992) was an Albanian folklorist, linguist, poet, and writer. He is regarded as one of the major authors of modern Albanian prose. His novel Rrathë is considered to be the first psychological novel written in Albanian.

== Life ==
Martin Camaj was born in Temal, Shkodër District, Shkodër County, northwestern Albania on 21 July 1925. He first studied in the Jesuit Saverian College of Shkodër and afterwards in the University of Belgrade. Later Camaj worked as professor of Albanian at the Sapienza University of Rome, where he did postgraduate research and finished studies on linguistics in 1960. In 1957, he became the editor-in-chief of the Albanological journal Shejzat published in Rome.

In 1961, he settled in Munich and first worked as a lector at LMU Munich, where in 1964 he became a Privatdozent. In 1970, he earned his professorship and was a professor of Albanology until 1990 at the same university. A resident of Lenggries, Bavaria since the 1970s, Camaj died there on 12 March 1992.

== Works ==
Camaj's works revolve around themes like the loss and search for tradition and the loneliness brought on by future changes. His first verse collections Nji fyell ndër male (A flute in mountains) and Kanga e Vërrinit (Song of the lowland pastures) were published in Pristina in 1953 and 1954 respectively. His first major prose work was Djella, published in Rome in 1958. His next novel Rrathë (Circles) was published in Munich in 1978.

Rrathë, which is Camaj's largest work, took him fifteen years to complete and is regarded as the first psychological novel written in Albanian. The novel is divided into three cycles: water, fire, and blood, which symbolize recurrent metaphysical and social themes. In 1981, a collection titled Shkundullima (Quaking) that included five short stories and one play was published. His last novel Karpa, which was published in 1987 in Rome, is a dystopian work set in 2238.
