= Alps of Albania National Park =

National park in Albania

- IUCN category II (national park)
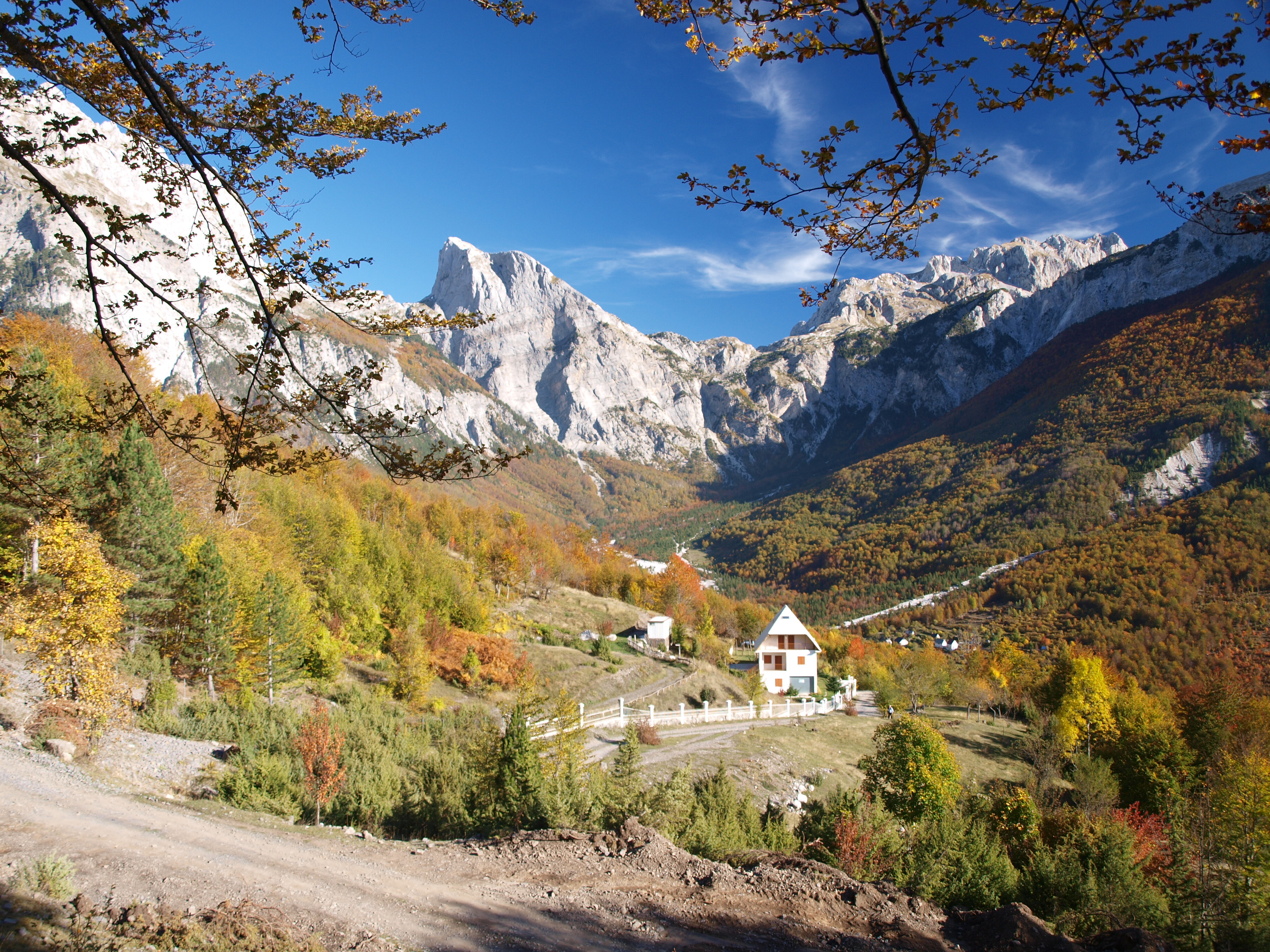
- Theth during autumn

- Location within Albania Location within Europe
- Location: Shkodër County, Kukës County
- Nearest city: Koplik
- Coordinates: 42°23′45″N 19°46′28″E
- Area: 82,844.65 ha (828.4465 km^{2})
- Established: 26 January 2022
- Governing body: National Agency of Protected Areas

Alps of Albania National Park (Albanian: Parku Kombëtar Alpet e Shqipërisë) is the largest national park in Albania. Established in 2022, the national park is located in northern Albania and covers an area of 8,844.65 ha (88.4465 km^{2}). The most prominent mountain range are the Albanian Alps (also called the Accursed Mountains), which are also the namesake of the national park. Most of Albania's peaks above 2,000 m are located here, including the highest peak of the Dinarides, Maja e Jezercës. The geological formation is dominated by high terrain, while having a variety of natural features including glaciers, valleys, rivers, mountains, waterfalls, dense forests and several rock formations. It is characterized by its very remote areas which have a large preserved ecosystem all of which is primarily untouched with pristine quality. The park was established to protect various ecosystems and biodiversity and the cultural and historical heritage of the region. The region has been also identified as an important Bird and Plant Area.

The park borders Montenegro in the north and Nikaj-Mërtur Regional Nature Park in the south.

The park was created as an amalgamation of Theth National Park (Albanian: Parku Kombëtar i Thethit), Valbona Valley National Park, and Gashi Nature Reserve. Theth National Park was established in 1966, covering 2,630 ha (26.3 km^{2}) around the larger portion of Shala Valley. Valbona Valley National Park was established in 1996. In 2017, Theth was declared a Protected Historic Center.

Theth village sprawls across the upper Shala Valley and is trapped on four sides by numerous two-thousanders such as Radohima in the west, Arapi and Poplluka in the north and Jezerca in the east. Standing at 1,795 m (5,889 ft), the Valbona Pass leads a mountain path in the west, which separates the Theth Valley from the Valbona Valley. Like most of the Albanian Alps, the park is dominated by limestone and dolomite rocks and shows major karst features such as the Grunas Canyon and the southern wall of Arapi, which is the highest rock face in the Balkans.

== Flora ==
Despite its limited area, the park is distinguished by a highly diverse flora with estimates which vary between 1500 and 1650 species of plants among which 70 species are endangered. Theth is part of a large preserved ecosystem all of which is primarily untouched with pristine quality. Biogeographically, the Dinaric Mountains mixed forests terrestrial ecoregion of the Palearctic temperate broadleaf and mixed forest biome occur in the park. There are three types of forest found at the park. The oak floor extends from an altitude between 600 metres up to 800 metres and is dominated, among other by austrian oak, oriental hornbeam, hophornbeam, cornel and flowering ash. The beech floor is mainly covered with common beech, silver fir and sycamore, between 900 metres and 1,900 metres. The alpine floor, lying at an altitude which ranges between 1,900 metres to 2,300 metres, is characterized by herbaceous plants and shrubs most notable amongst them is the juniper and willow. Moreover, the most important plants of this floor include the alpine bluegrass, alpine aster, trefoil and common bird's-foot trefoil.

== Fauna ==
Only 20 species of mammals has been recorded within the park's land area. Additionally, large mammals such as brown bear, roe deer, chamois as well as rare or endangered species like the gray wolf, lynx, and wild goat inhabit the park. 50 species of birds have been observed, with raptors such as the golden eagle, lesser kestrel, nuthatch, robin, blackbird, red-backed shrike, western capercaillie and rock partridge. Due to the harsh winters, the park has few reptile and amphibian species. A total of 10 species of reptiles and 8 species of amphibia reside in park including the alpine salamander, common frog, alpine newt and brown trout.

== Gallery ==
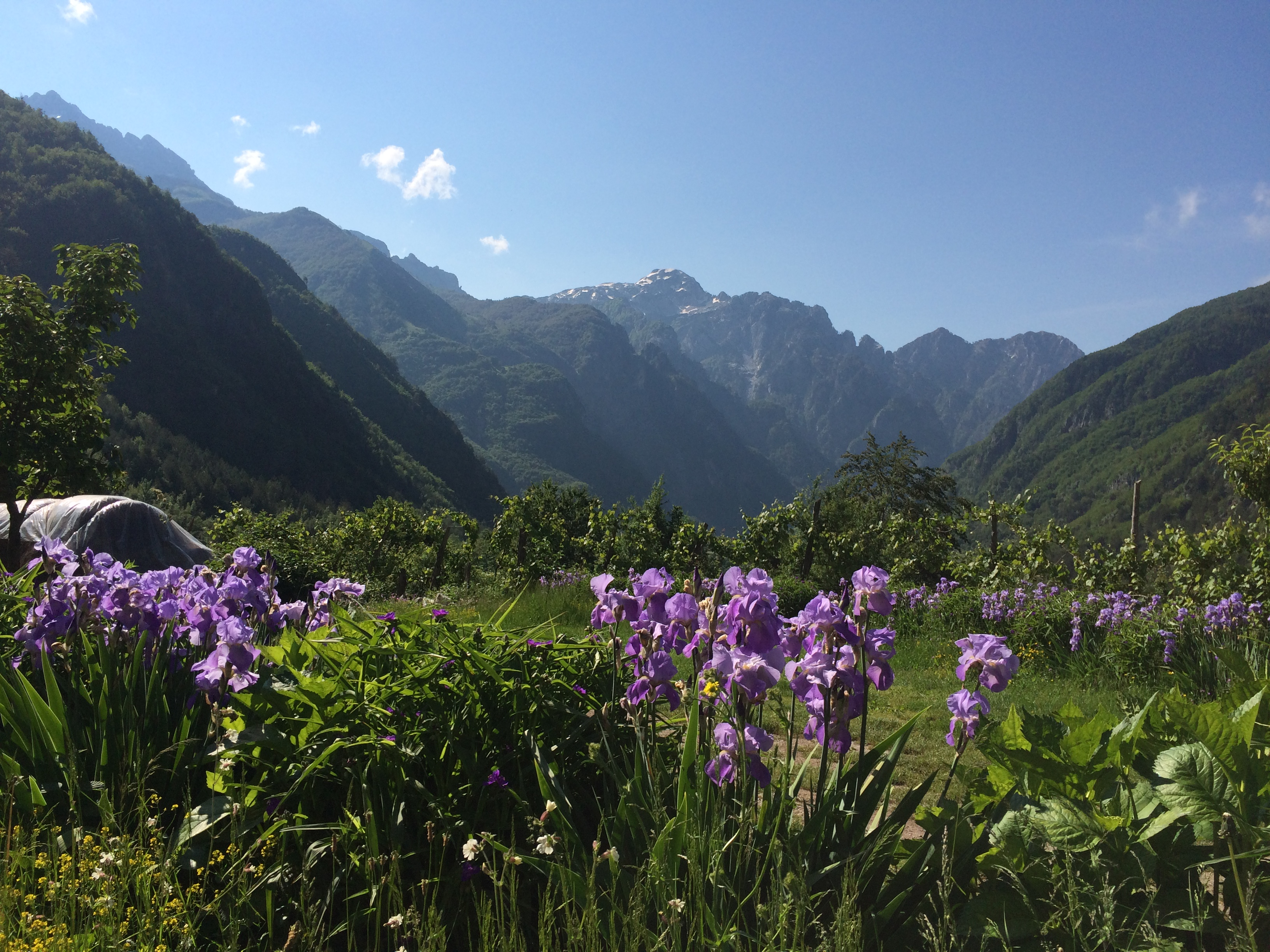
The Tulipa albanica is an endemic species in the Albanian Alps

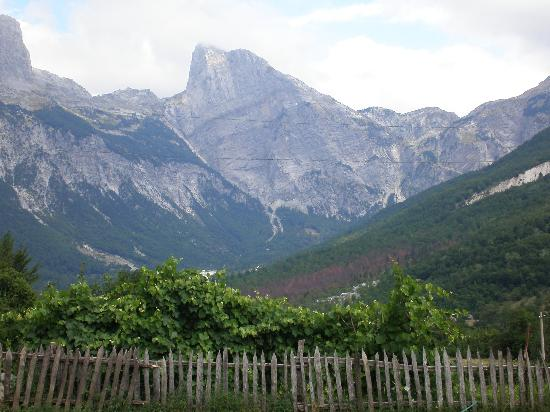
Arapi, the country's longest horizontal cave is located beneath the wall

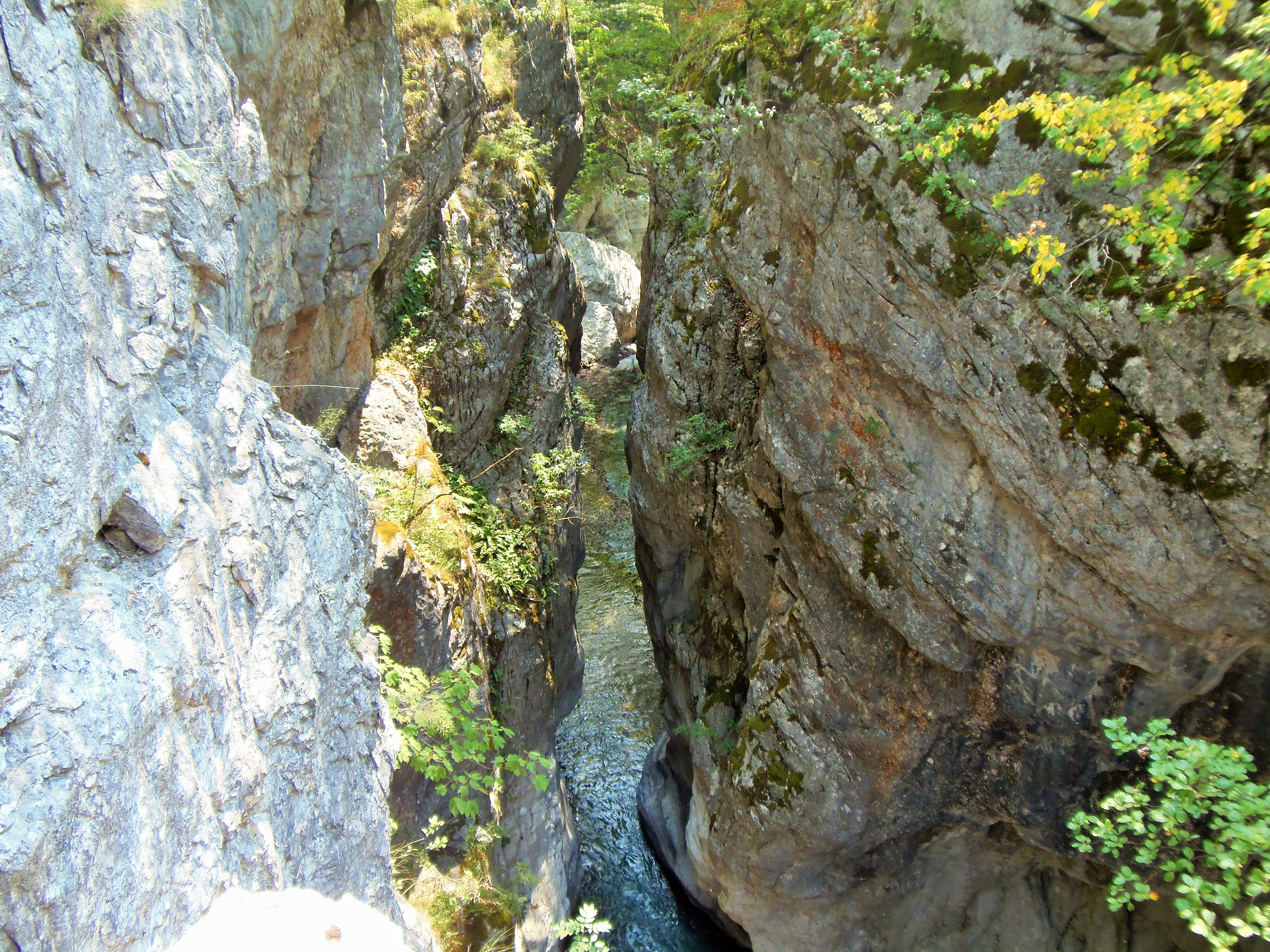
Grunas Canyon has vast carbon formations

== See also ==
- Geography of Albania
- Protected areas of Albania
- Albanian Alps
