= Fierzë, Kukës =

Fierzë
- Administrative unit
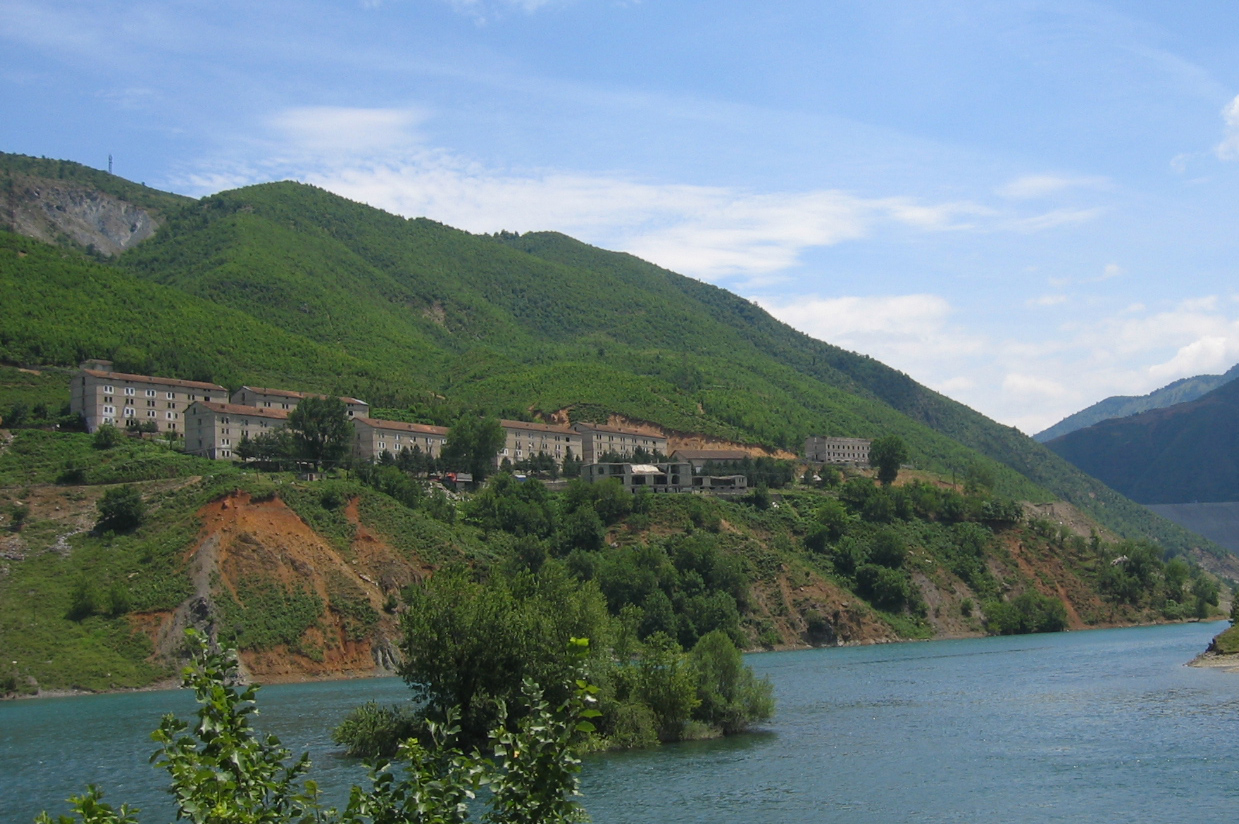
- Settlement of Fierzë, on the Tropojë side, with the dam at right

- Location within Albania
- Coordinates: 42°17′N 20°2′E
- Country: Albania
- County: Kukës
- Municipality: Tropojë

Population (2023)
  - Administrative unit: 1,149
- Time zone: UTC+1 (CET)
  - Summer (DST): UTC+2 (CEST)

Fierzë is a town and a former municipality in the Kukës County, northern Albania. At the 2015 local government reform it became a subdivision of the municipality Tropojë. The population at the 2023 census was 1,149.

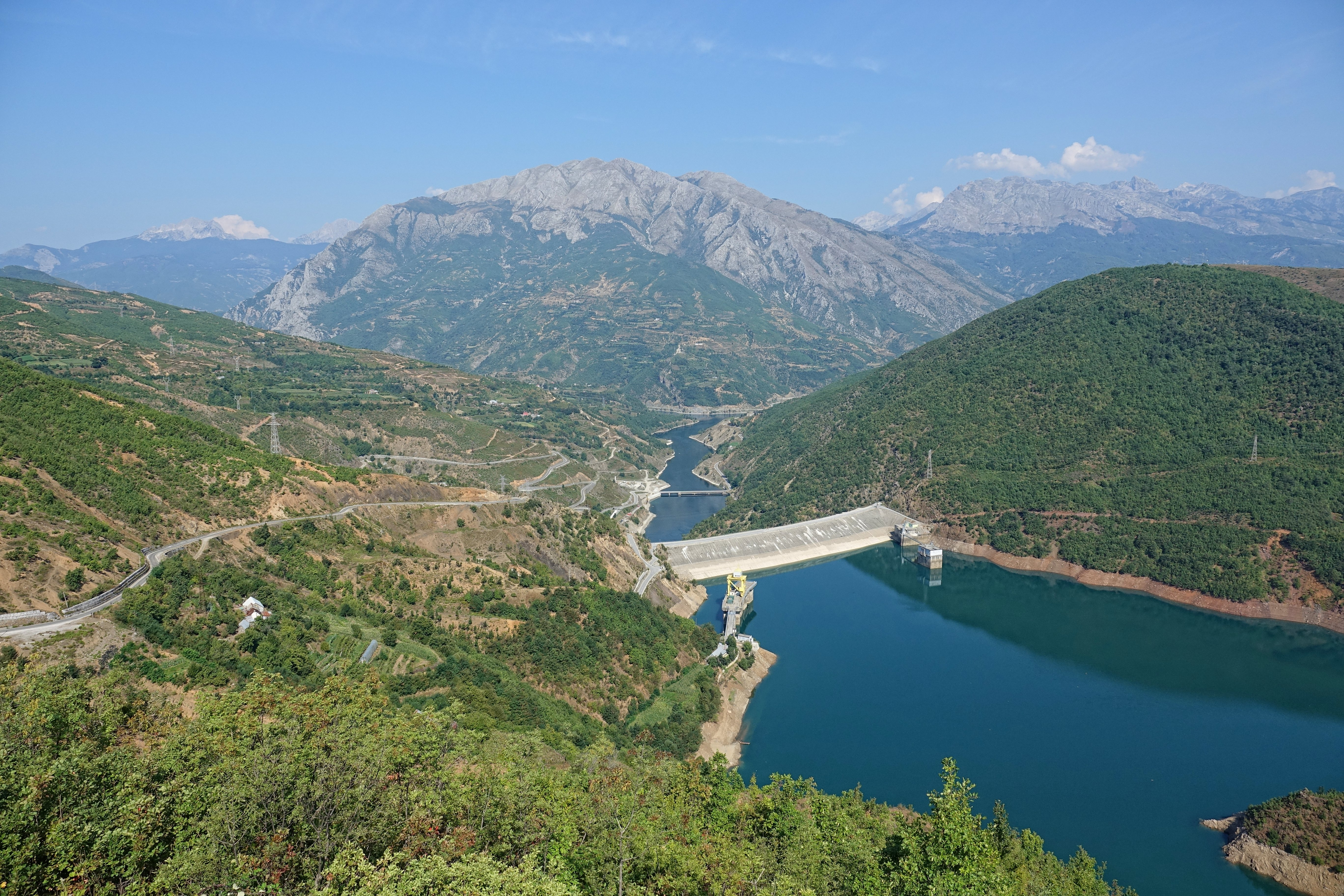
View of the Fierza dam, with Lake Koman and Fierza village behind it.

Fierzë sits on the right, northern bank of the Drin, opposite the village Fierzë in Fushë-Arrëz municipality. The Drin river was dammed above Fierzë to form Lake Fierzë in the 1970s and Lake Koman in the 1980s. The Fierzë dam is the tallest dam in Albania, at 152 metres high. The power plant at Fierzë is one of the most important producers of electricity in the country.

The dammed Drin is not alone in passing through Fierzë. Here the Valbonë joins the Drin from the north and various traffic routes intersect. The most important is the Drin itself. On Lake Koman, there is a daily ferry. During the summer tourist season, two taxi services run between Koman at the other end of the lake to Fierzë and Breg-Lumi. The pier at Breg-Lumi is moved according to the water level of the lake and usually consists of only a small concrete ramp on an unpaved, flat surface. A road links Fierzë, where a bridge crosses the Drin, to the town of Bajram Curri around 15 km to the north and to Fushë-Arrëz in the south which was previously very difficult to reach because of the mountains in the way. The ferry on Lake Fierzë, which goes to Kukës, was already in service in the 1990s.

Remains of Roman buildings and a Roman street have been found in Fierzë. New Catholic churches have been built in Fierzë-Pukë and Breg-Lumi.
