= Koman Hydroelectric Power Station =

Komani Hydroelectric Power Station
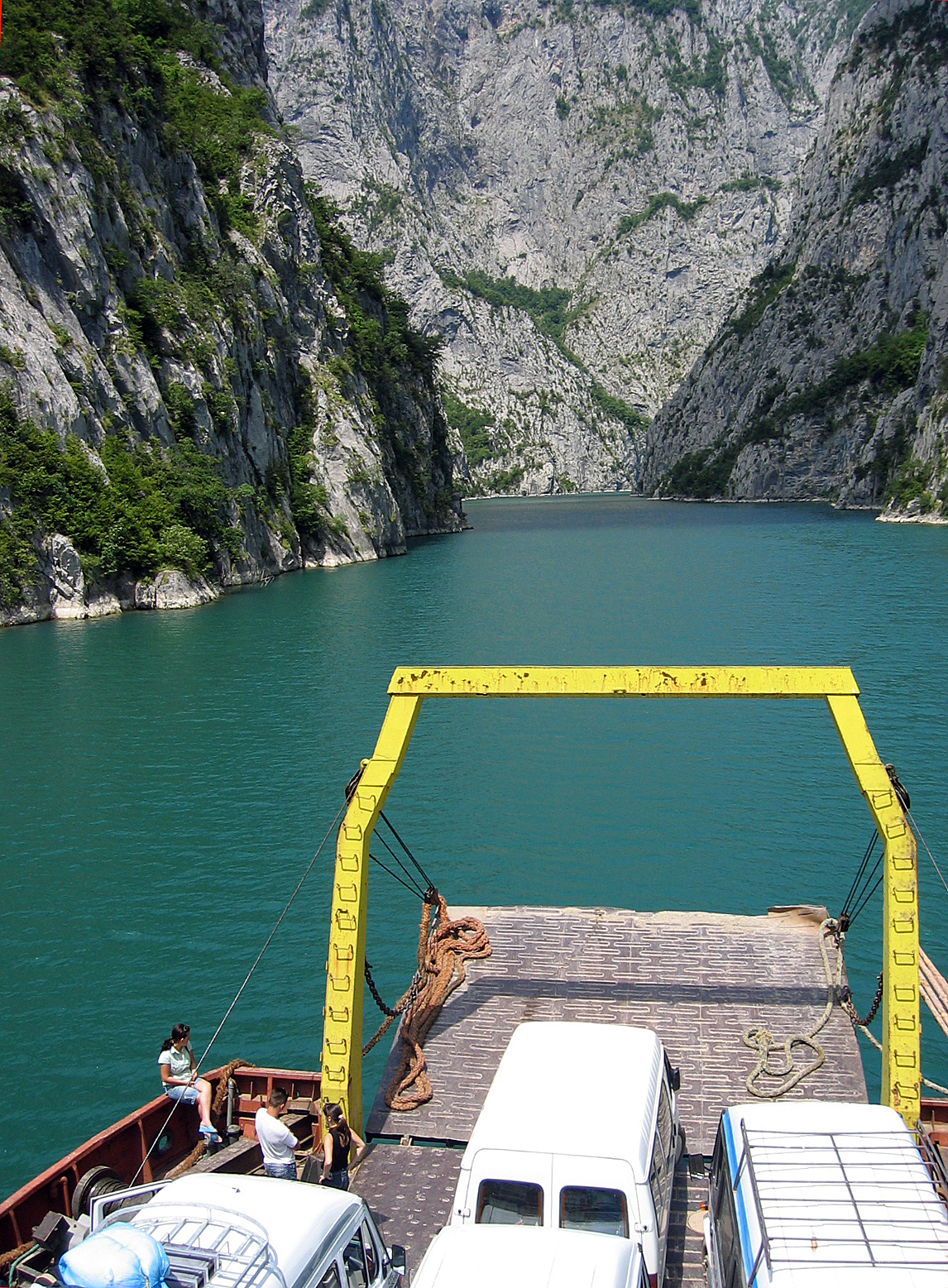
- A ferry on the Drin River
- Interactive map of Komani Hydroelectric Power Station
- Location: Albania
- Coordinates: 42°06′23″N 19°49′37″E
- Construction began: 1979
- Opening date: 1985; 41 years ago
- Owner: Albanian Power Corporation

Dam and spillways
- Type of dam: Rock-fill dam
- Impounds: Drini River
- Height: 130 m (427 ft)
- Length: 275 m (902 ft)
- Spillway capacity: 3,400 m3/sec

Reservoir
- Creates: Koman Reservoir
- Total capacity: 16,000,000,000 m^{3} (5.7×10^{11} ft^{3})
- Surface area: 12 km^{2} (5 mi^{2})
- Maximum water depth: 96 m (315 ft)

Power Station
- Operator: Albanian Power Corporation
- Turbines: 4 × 150 MW
- Installed capacity: 600 MW

The Koman Hydroelectric Power Station (Albanian: Hidrocentrali i Komanit) is a large hydroelectric power station (HPP), for which a dam on the Drin River was built. The dam is near the settlement of Koman, northern Albania. It is the second of three dams of the Drin River cascade; the Fierza Hydroelectric Power Station upstream, and the Vau i Dejës Hydroelectric Power Station downstream. The dam, 130m tall, was completed in 1985 and the reservoir, Lake Koman, was filled with water at full capacity in 1986.

Completed in 1986, the power station consists of four turbines of French origin with a nominal capacity of 150 MW each, totalling the installed capacity to 600 MW.

== See also ==
- Koman and Fierza Reservoirs Ferry
- List of power stations in Albania
