= Skavica Hydro Power Plant =

Proposed power plant in Albania

Skavica hydropower plant
- Country: Albania
- Coordinates: 41°56′36″N 20°21′55″E
- Purpose: Power
- Status: Proposed

Dam and spillways
- Impounds: Drin river

Power Station
- Installed capacity: 120-250 MW

Skavica Hydro Power Plant is a proposed large power plant on the Drin River situated in Albania.

The project consists of a large power plant with a nominal capacity of 250 MW on the Drin River operated by the Italian company TGK Group that will invest US$664 million in the project.
