= Fierza Hydroelectric Power Station =

Fierza Hydropower Plant
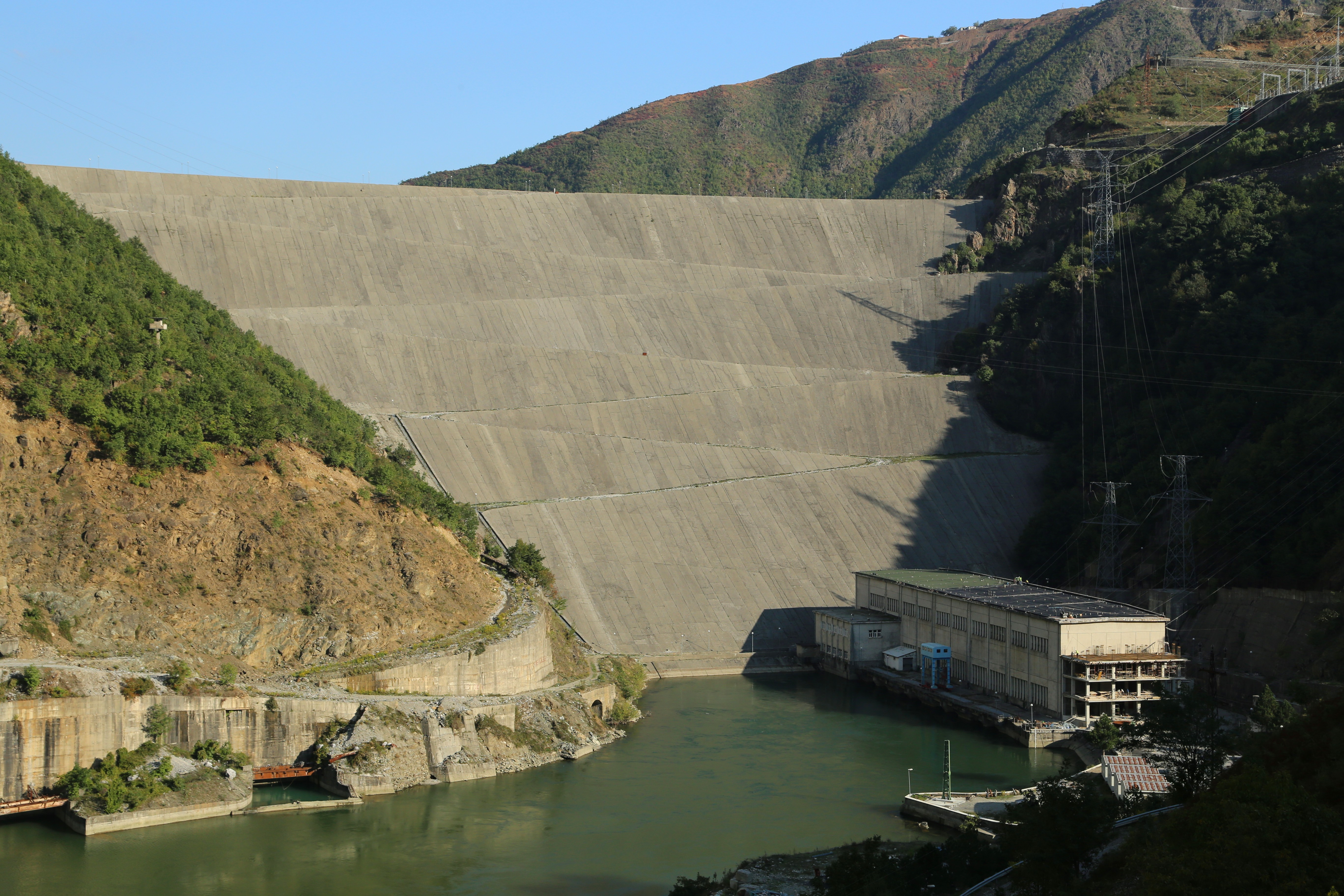
- Fierza Hydroelectric Power Station in 2013.
- Interactive map of Fierza Hydropower Plant
- Official name: Hidrocentrali i Fierzës
- Location: Albania
- Coordinates: 42°15′05″N 20°02′35″E
- Construction began: 1971
- Opening date: 1978; 48 years ago

Dam and spillways
- Type of dam: Rock-fill dam
- Impounds: Drin River
- Height: 167 m (548 ft)
- Length: 380 m (1,250 ft)
- Width (base): 576 m (1,890 ft)

Reservoir
- Creates: Fierza Reservoir
- Total capacity: 28,000,000,000 m^{3} (9.9×10^{11} ft^{3})
- Catchment area: 11,829 km^{2} (4,567 mi^{2})
- Surface area: 72.5 km^{2} (28.0 mi^{2})
- Maximum water depth: 128 m (420 ft)

Power Station
- Operator: Albanian Power Corporation
- Hydraulic head: 118 m
- Turbines: 4 × 125 MW
- Installed capacity: 500 MW
- Annual generation: 1,330 GWh

The Fierza Hydroelectric Power Station (Albanian: Hidrocentrali i Fierzës) is a large hydroelectric power station on the Drin River, in Albania.

Fierza is the upper HPP (Hydro Power Plant) of the Drin River cascade followed by the power stations of Koman and Vau i Dejës downstream. Based on the installed power capacity, position and the volume of the reservoir, Fierza plays a key role in the exploitation, regulation and safe operation of the Drin cascade.

Work for its construction began in 1970. The first power unit became operational in 1978 and the plant was fully operational in 1980. Fierza HPP was built with equipment mostly from China but on the concepts of Albanian engineers. Around 14,000 workers, engineers and specialist were involved in the construction of the plant.

Fierza is a HPP with a rock-fill dam with a clay core and reservoir. When it was built, Fierza was the second in Europe for the height of its type. The dam has a total volume of 8 million m^{3}.

This rock-fill dam measures 167 m (548 ft) in height, and 380 m (1,250 ft) in length along the crest. Construction began in 1971 and was completed seven years later in 1978. The dam is one of the three hydroelectric dams on the Drin River. The reservoir was filled with water between 1978 and 1981.

The four units installed in the plant have "Francis" vertical turbines with 125 MW power each; 3-Phase synchronous generators of 13.8kV voltage; and step-up transformers 13.8kV/242 kV for the connection with the transmission system substation.

The annual output of Fierza HPP averages in 1,330 GWh, that represent approximately 33% of the Drin cascade production.

The importance of Fierza, beside energy production, relates on the capacity of its lake which regulates the annual inflows and increase the efficient use of the Drin cascade.

== See also ==
- Koman and Fierza Reservoirs Ferry
- List of power stations in Albania
