= Fierzë, Shkodër =

Fierzë
- Administrative unit
- Location within Albania
- Coordinates: 42°15′N 20°1′E
- Country: Albania
- County: Shkodër
- Municipality: Fushë-Arrëz
  - Administrative unit: 81.19 km^{2} (31.35 sq mi)

Population (2011)
  - Administrative unit: 1,302
  - Administrative unit density: 16.04/km^{2} (41.53/sq mi)
- Time zone: UTC+1 (CET)
  - Summer (DST): UTC+2 (CEST)

Fierzë is a village and a former municipality in the Shkodër County, northwestern Albania. At the 2015 local government reform it became a subdivision of the municipality Fushë-Arrëz. The population at the 2011 census was 1,302. The former municipality (now an administrative unit) has an area of 81.19 km^{2} (31.35 sq mi). It lies on the left, southern bank of the river Drin, opposite the village Fierzë in Tropojë municipality.

== Settlements ==
There are 8 settlements within Fierzë:

1. Aprip-Guri
2. Arst
3. Bugjon
4. Fierzë
5. Kokdodë
6. Mëzi
7. Miliska
8. Porav
