= Kuman language =

Kuman language can refer to three different languages:

- Kuman language (Uganda), a Western Nilotic language spoken in Uganda
- Kuman language (New Guinea), a.k.a. Chimbu, spoken in Papua New Guinea
- Cuman language, an extinct Turkic language once spoken by the Cumans in the steppes of Eastern Europe
