= Temal =

- Administrative unit
- Location within Albania
- Coordinates: 42°6′N 19°49′E
- Country: Albania
- County: Shkodër
- Municipality: Vau i Dejës

Population (2011)
  - Administrative unit: 1,562
- Time zone: UTC+1 (CET)
  - Summer (DST): UTC+2 (CEST)

Temal is a former municipality in the Shkodër County, northwestern Albania. At the 2015 local government reform it became a subdivision of the municipality Vau i Dejës. The population at the 2011 census was 1,562. It is part of the Dukagjin Highlands region.

== Notable people ==
Martin Camaj, linguist and professor of Albanology at LMU Munich.
