= Fierza Reservoir =

Lake in Albania and Kosovo

Fierza
- Fierza Reservoir
- Liqeni i Fierzës (Albanian)
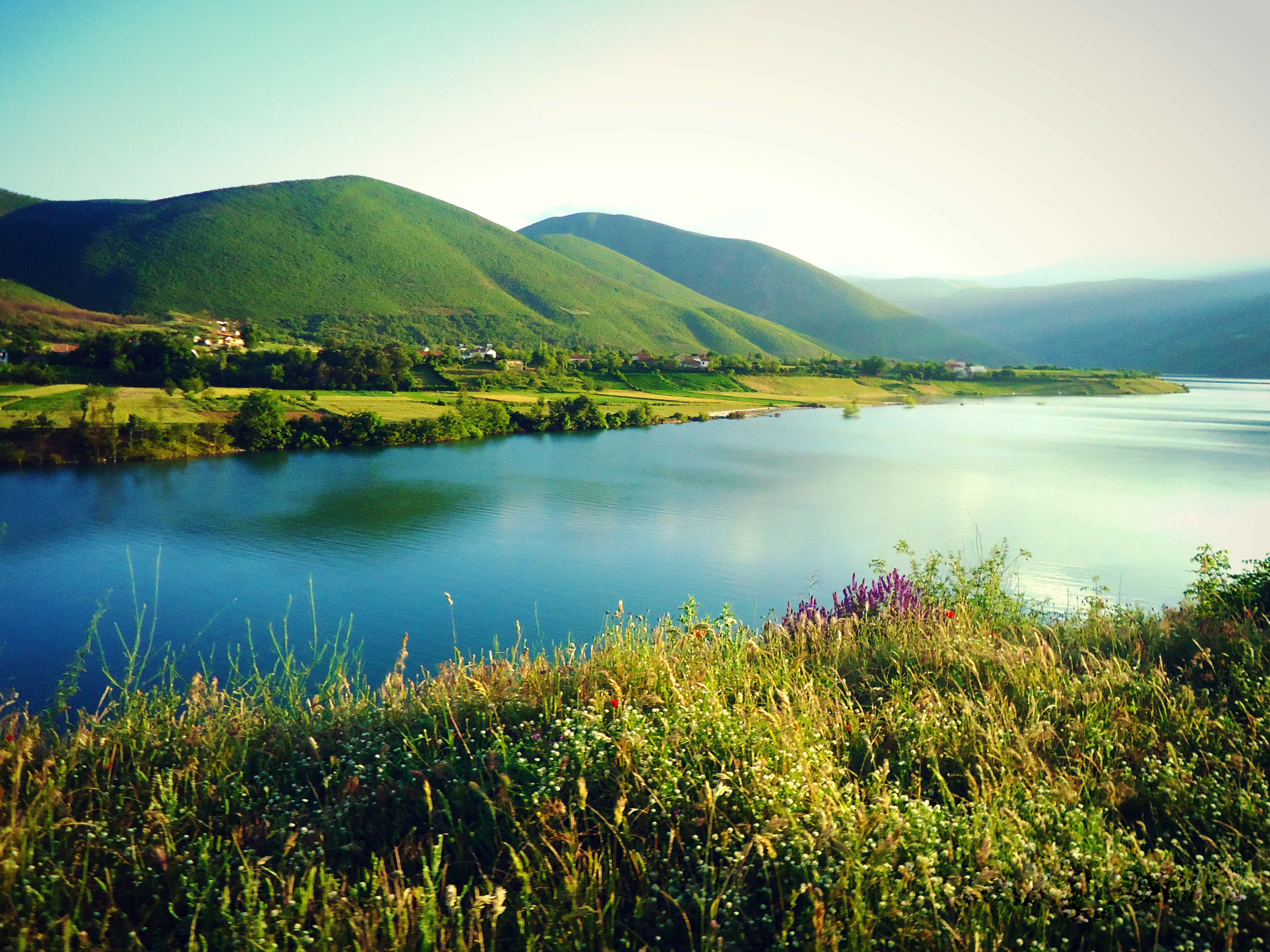

- Location within Albania Location within Kosovo Location within Europe
- Location: Albania, Kosovo
- Coordinates: 42°15′0″N 20°2′30″E
- Type: reservoir
- Catchment area: 11,829 km^{2} (4,567 mi^{2})
- Surface area: 72.5 km^{2} (28.0 mi^{2})
- Max. depth: 128 m (420 ft)
- Water volume: 2,700,000,000 m^{3} (9.5×10^{10} cu ft)

The Fierza Reservoir (Albanian: Liqeni i Fierzës) is a reservoir in Albania and Kosovo. The Drin River and parts of the White Drin and Black Drin also run through the reservoir. The size of the lake is 72.6 km^{2} (28.0 sq mi), of which 2.46 km^{2} (0.95 sq mi) belong to Kosovo. It is 70 km (43 mi) long and has a depth of 128 m (420 ft). On the Albanian side of the lake there are many canyons and some small islands. The dam is 167 m (548 ft) tall. In 2014, the lake was declared a Regional Nature Park by the Kukës County Council.

The reservoir was formed as a result of the construction of the Fierza Hydroelectric Power Station in 1978 by the Albanian government.

== See also ==
- Lakes of Albania
- Geography of Albania
- Lakes of Kosovo
- Geography of Kosovo
