= Küman =

Village and municipality in Lerik Rayon, Azerbaijan

Coordinates: 38°52′N 48°25′E

Küman (also, Koman) is a village and municipality in the Lerik Rayon of Azerbaijan. It has a population of 186.
