= Koman, Albania =

Koman
- Village
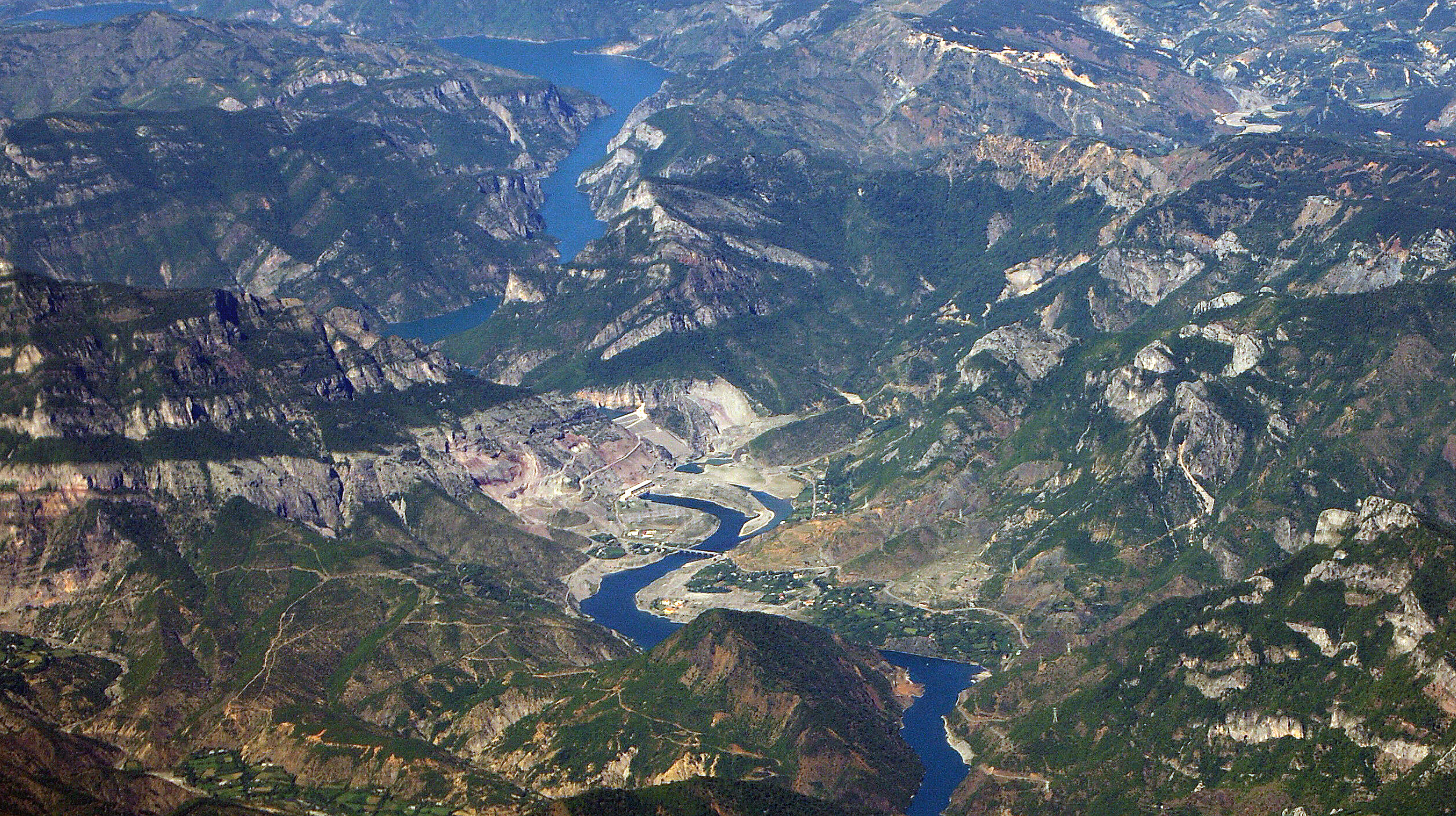
- River Drin in the area of Koman, with the village, the dam and the lake

- Location within Albania
- Coordinates: 42°5′25″N 19°48′44″E
- Country: Albania
- County: Shkodër
- Municipality: Vau i Dejës
- Administrative unit: Temal
- Time zone: UTC+1 (CET)
  - Summer (DST): UTC+2 (CEST)

Koman is a settlement in the former Temal municipality, Shkodër County, northern Albania. At the 2015 local government reform it became part of the municipality Vau i Dejës. The Koman Hydroelectric Power Station and lake Koman have taken the name of the settlement.

The settlement takes its name from the Cumans. It is the type site of the Koman culture and its fort is on the nearby Dalmace Hill, around which is built an important theory of the transition between Illyrians and Albanians.
