= Drin (river) =

River in southeastern Europe

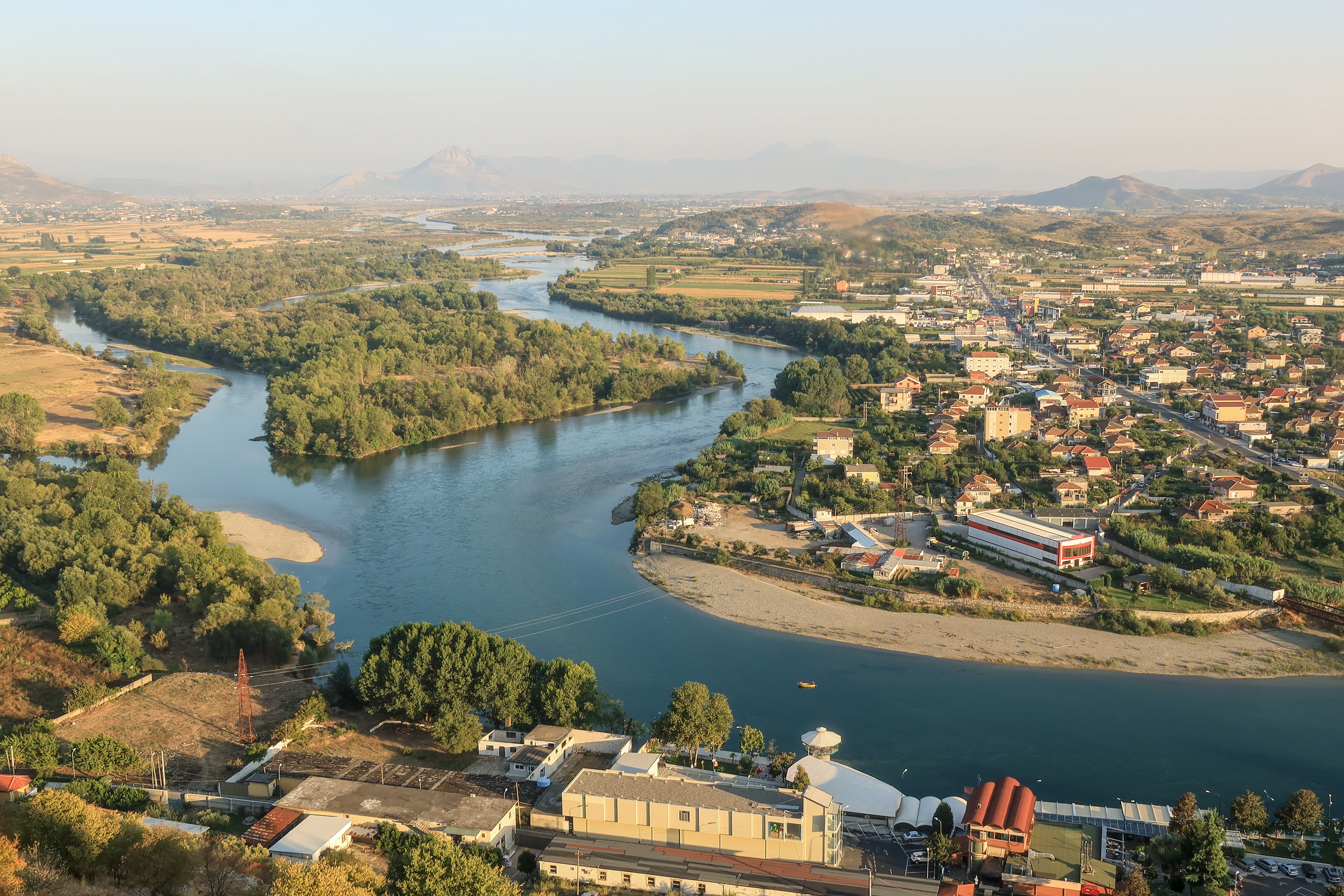
- Drin delta flowing through Shkodër

Location
- Countries: Albania; Kosovo; North Macedonia
- Region: Southern Europe
- Cities: Prizren; Shkodër; Kukës; Lezhë; Struga; Debar; Peshkopi; Maqellarë

Physical characteristics
- Source: White Drin at Zhleb Mountains near Radavc
  - location: Kosovo, Peja District
- 2nd source: Black Drin at Lake Ohrid near Struga
  - location: North Macedonia, Struga Municipality
- Source confluence: Near Kukës
  - location: Kukës County, Albania
- Mouth: Large Drin: Buna; Small Drin: Gulf of Drin
  - location: Large Drin: Shkodër County; Small Drin: Lezhë County, Albania
  - elevation: 5 m (16 ft)
- Length: 285 km (177 mi)
- Basin size: 19,686 km^{2} (7,601 sq mi)
- Discharge
  - location: the river mouth
  - average: 352 m^{3}/s (12,400 cu ft/s)
  - maximum: 1,800 m^{3}/s (64,000 cu ft/s)

Basin features
- Progression: Adriatic Sea
- Tributaries
  - left: Black Drin, Mirusha, Prizren, Toplluha
  - right: White Drin, Sateska, Radika, Perro, Bushtrica, White Drin: Peja, Deçan, Erenik, Black Drin: Valbona, Shala, Kir, Mertur

The Drin (/driːn/; Albanian: Drin [dɾin] or Drini [ˈdɾini]; Macedonian: Дрим, romanized: Drim [drim]) is a river in Southeastern Europe with two major tributaries – the White Drin and the Black Drin and two distributaries – one discharging into the Adriatic Sea, in the Gulf of Drin and the other into the Buna River. Its catchment area extends across Albania, Kosovo, Serbia, Greece, Montenegro and North Macedonia and is home to more than 1.6 million people. The river and its tributaries form the Gulf of Drin, an ocean basin that encompasses the northern Albanian Adriatic Sea Coast.

At 285 kilometres (177 miles) long, the Drin is the longest river of Albania and its tributaries cross through both Kosovo and North Macedonia. Its northern tributary, the White Drin starts from the foothills of Žljeb, at White Drin Waterfall in west Kosovo, and flows generally south, whereas its southern tributary, the Black Drin originates from Ohrid lake in the town of Struga, North Macedonia and flows north. Both tributaries' confluence occurs near Kukës in northeast Albania and Drin then flows westwards through the Albanian Alps and Dukagjin Highlands, where three successive dams were erected between 1960s and late 1980s, forming 3 large artificial lakes. The Drin then passes Vau i Dejës and drains into the Adriatic Sea through its two distributaries in Buna river and west of Lezhë.

Located in the Balkan Peninsula at the crossroad of Europe and Asia, the river basin's varied climate and topography have shaped a vast array of flora and fauna. In addition, it has been recognized as one of the most important biodiversity hotspots in Europe. The Drin Delta is classified as an Important Bird Area of international importance by designation under the BirdLife International Convention.

== Etymology ==
The name of the river is recorded in Ancient Greek as Drilon (Δρίλων) and in Latin as Drinus. The name is considered to be of Illyrian origin. The form Drin- has been evidenced by Pliny the Elder (fl. 1st century AD) and is most likely primary. The ancient name Drinus has undergone sound changes reaching the current Albanian form Drin through the evolution of Albanian sound changes. The Macedonian name of the river is Дрим, Drim. Homonym rivers are Drino between southern Albania and northwestern Greece, and Drina between Bosnia and Herzegovina and Serbia.

The valley of the river was inhabited by several Illyrian peoples. It was probably dominated at some point and to some extent by the Enchele. The tribal territory of the Taulantii and of the Labeatae was most likely located near the river.

== Course ==
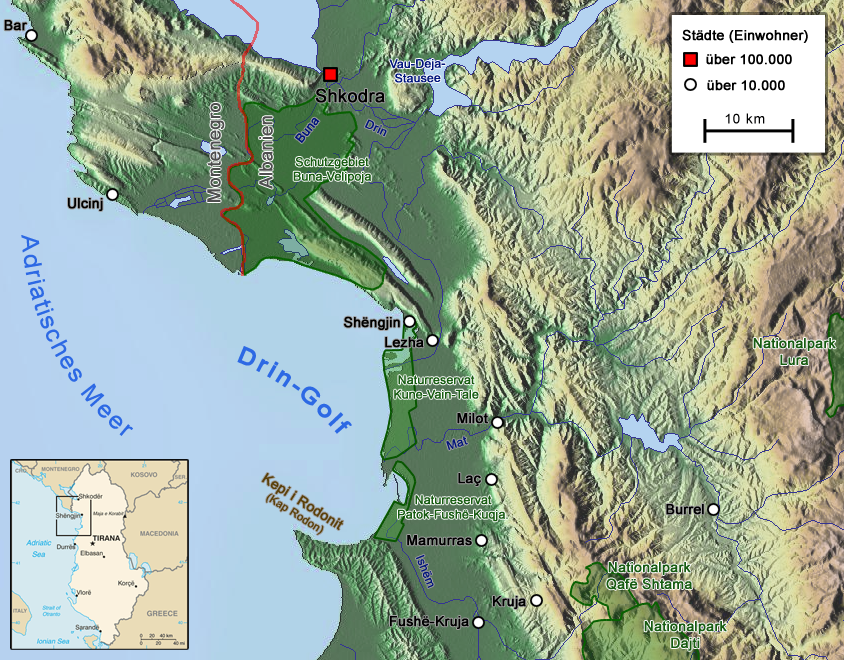
Mouth of Drin and Gulf of Drin on the Adriatic coast in northern Albania.

After the confluence of its two tributaries, near the town of Kukës in the northeast Albania, Drin flows west, passing through the Albanian Alps and Fierzë then upon reaching the Dukagjini highlands, flowing then to the south through Apripë e Gurit, Toplanë, Dushman, Koman, Vjerdhë Mazrrek, Rragam, and Pale Lalej. At Vau i Dejës, it enters the low Shkodër Field and splits into two distributaries. One empties into the Gulf of Drin into the Adriatic Sea southwest of Lezhë, forming the Mouth of Drin. The other empties into the Bojana River near the Rozafa Castle.

The Black Drin flows out from the Lake Ohrid near Struga through western North Macedonia and then eastern Albania. The White Drin originates from the Žljeb mountain, north of the town of Peja in the Dukagjin region of Kosovo, and flows from there through to Albania.

The basin encompasses the transboundary subbasins of Lake Shkodër (largest lake in Southern Europe), Lake Ohrid (one of the most ancient lakes in the World), Lake Prespa and Small Prespa Lake and also the tributaries, namely Black Drin, White Drin and Bojana River. All these subbasins and tributaries are home to numerous species of mammals, vascular plants, insects, amphibians, fish and birds.

== Economy ==
Drin river contains the largest hydroelectric power station group in the Balkans regarding the installed capacity and reservoir capacity. The Drin is extremely important for the Albanian economy, especially for its electrical production. The three largest hydropower facilities produce 70.6% of Albania's electricity (approx. 1400MW of total installed capacity). North Macedonia has built two hydropower plants – Globocica (42 MW) and Spilje Hydro Power Plant (84 MW) on the Black Drin.

The artificial Lake Fierza created by the dam at Fierzë is the largest artificial lake in Albania with its surface of 73 km^{2}. The second largest artificial lake is also built on this river. Vau i Dejës lake has an area of 25 km^{2}. Construction of the Fierza power station caused some controversy in the 1980s. Without reaching any agreement, the Albanian government ordered the reservoir to be filled with water, which flooded some border areas of Kosovo, then part of Yugoslavia. The Yugoslav government protested, but no solution was agreed on. Thus, today, Lake Fierza is shared by Albania and Kosovo.

== Drainage basin ==
- ◆ located within North Macedonia
- ◆ located within Kosovo
- Drin
    - Black Drin
      - (L): Balicikë and Jabllanicë streams
      - (R): Dallgash stream
      - Radikë river, Mavrovë and Carakë streams, Zalli i Bulqizës river
        - (L): Banjë, Deshat, Gramë, Tepuz, Veleshicë, Prillushë and Tershan streams
        - (R): Mur, Setë, Mollë and Lurë streams
    - White Drin
      - Lumë river
        - Orgjost and Topojan streams
      - (R): Bistrica e Pejës
      - (R): Bistrica e Deçanit
      - (R): Erenik
      - (L): Bistrica e Prizrenit
      - (L): Mirusha
      - (L): Toplluha, Klinë
      - (L): Istok
  - Valbonë
    - Pecmarë, Vrulla e Shoshanit, Gashi and Tropojë streams
  - Shalë
    - Okol and Shtrazë streams
    - Theth river
      - Kaprej and Maja e Zezë streams
    - Bigë, Gura e Lekajt, Kosan and Shehu i Abatit streams
    - Stupje stream
      - Lesniqe river
  - Nikaj
    - (L): Curraj stream
      - Kuç stream
    - (R): Nikaj stream
  - Gjadër and Kir rivers

== Annotations ==
1. Author Tom Streissguth, gives a length of 335 km (208 mi) for Drin, as measured from the source of its tributary White Drin. This figure doesn't appear in other reliable sources or textbooks, where Drin's length shows 285 km.

== See also ==
- Gulf of Drin
- Geography of Albania
- Central Mountain Range
- List of rivers of Albania

== Bibliography ==
- Demiraj, Shaban (2006). The origin of the Albanians: linguistically investigated. Academy of Sciences of Albania. ISBN 9789994381715. Archived from the original on 20 November 2020.
- Katičić, Radoslav (1976). Ancient Languages of the Balkans. Mouton. ISBN 978-9027933058.
- Shpuza, Saimir (2017). Dyczek, Piotr (ed.). "Scodra and the Labeates. Cities, rural fortifications and territorial defense in the Hellenistic period". Novensia. 28. Warszawa: Ośrodek Badań nad Antykiem Europy Południowo-Wschodniej: 41–64. ISBN 978-83-946222-5-1. ISSN 0860-5777.
