= Accursed Mountains =

Mountain range in Southeast Europe

- Bjeshkët e Namuna / Prokletije
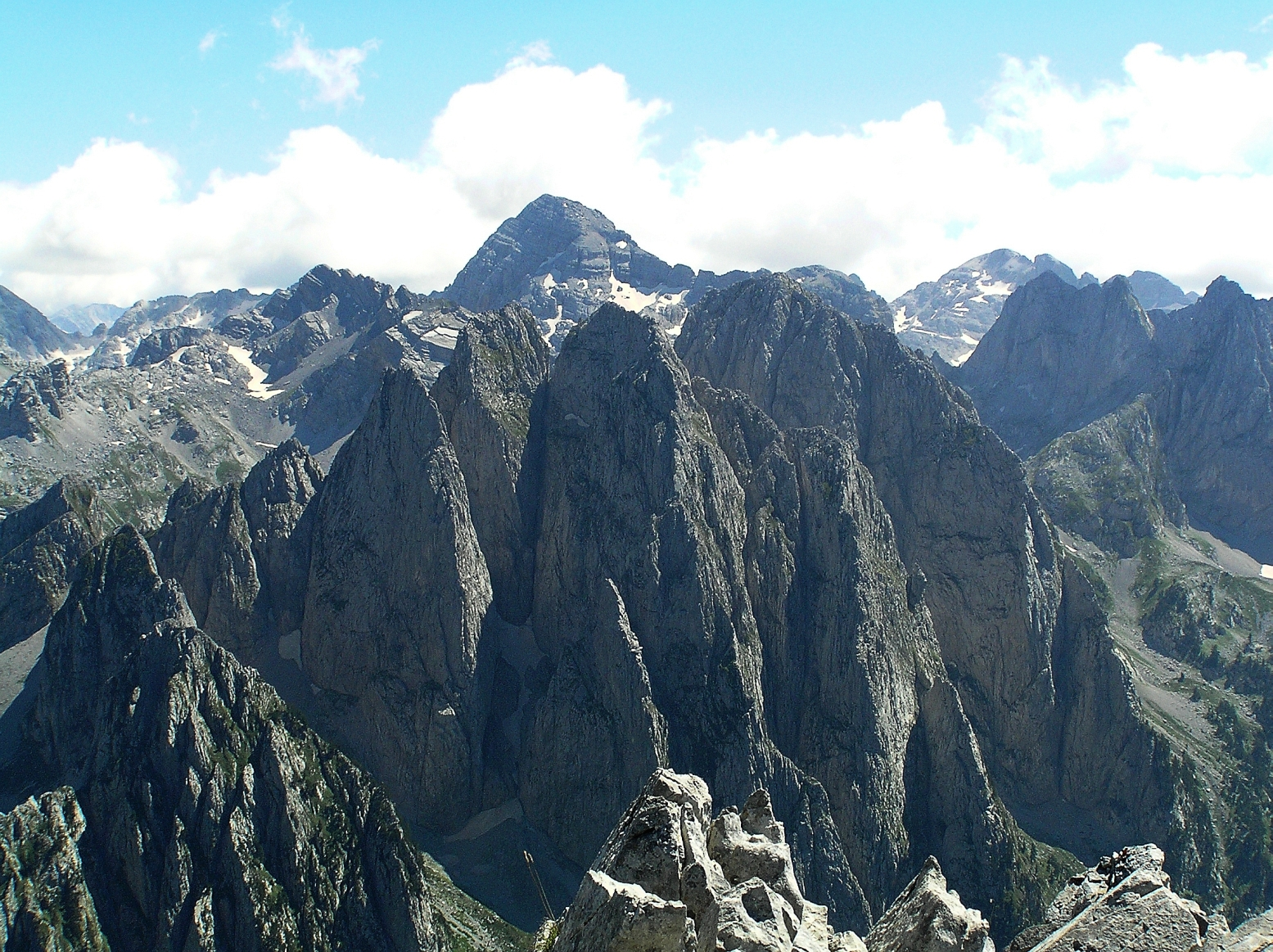
- The Accursed Mountains, with the range's highest peak Maja Jezercë in the distance.

Highest point
- Peak: Jezercë
- Elevation: 2,694 m (8,839 ft)
- Coordinates: 42°26′32″N 19°48′46″E

Geography
- Location within Albania Location within Kosovo Location within Montenegro
- Countries: Albania; Montenegro; Kosovo
- Region: Albanian Alps
- Parent range: Dinaric Alps

The Accursed Mountains (Albanian: Bjeshkët e Nemuna; Montenegrin: Prokletije / Проклетије, pronounced [prɔklɛ̌tijɛ]; both translated as "Cursed Mountains"), also known as the Albanian Alps, is a mountain range in coastal Southeast Europe adjacent to the Adriatic Sea. It is the southernmost subrange of the 1,000-kilometre-long (621 mi) Dinaric Alps range (Dinarides), extending from northern Albania to southwestern Serbia to western Kosovo and northeastern Montenegro. Maja Jezercë, standing at 2,694 m (8,839 ft), is the highest point of the Accursed Mountains and of all Dinaric Alps, and the fifth highest peak in Albania. The range includes the mountain Zla Kolata, which, at 2,534 m (8,314 ft), is the tallest mountain in Montenegro. The range also includes the mountain Gjeravica, which, at 2,656 m (8,714 ft), is the second tallest mountain in Kosovo. One of the southernmost glacial masses in Europe was discovered in the Albanian part of the range in 2009.

== Name ==
The origin of the name "Accursed Mountains" is disputed. According to one local legend, the devil escaped from hell and created the jagged glacial karsts in a single day of mischief. Others say a woman cursed the mountains while she and her children trekked through them on a scorching-hot day and could not find any water. A third legend claims Slavic soldiers gave the mountains their name as they struggled to march through them.

Both the Albanian (Bjeshkët e Nemuna) and Serbo-Croatian (Prokletije) names mean "The Accursed Mountains".

== Location and relief ==
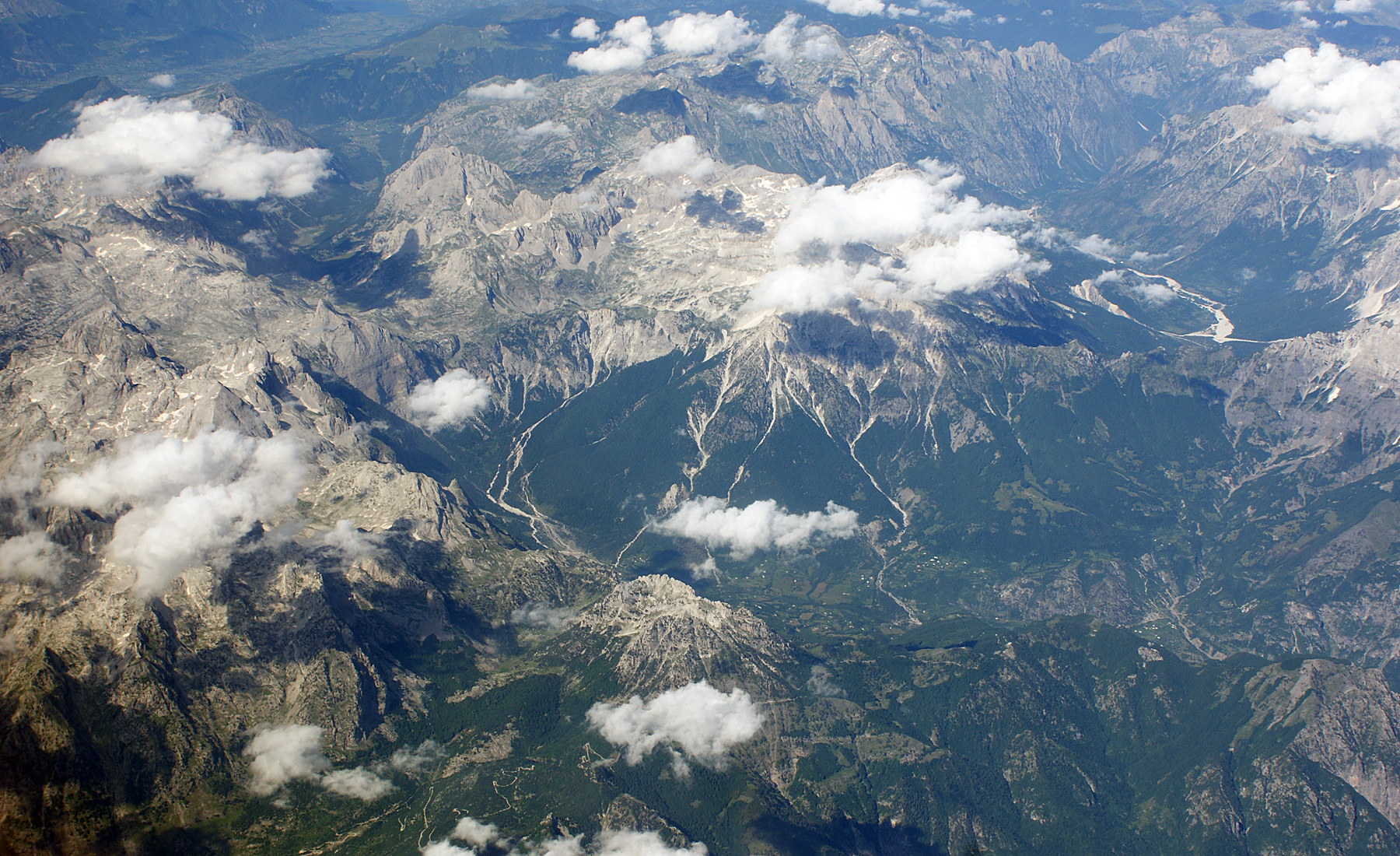
Annotated image of the area from the air – Theth Valley at center

The Accursed Mountains, the southernmost part of the Dinaric Alps, stretch more than 60 kilometres (40 mi) from Lake Skadar along the Montenegrin–Albanian border in the southwest to Kosovo in the northeast. These points are at 42°45' and 42°15' N in the Mediterranean zone of the western Balkans. The southern boundary of the Accursed Mountains is at the river Drin and its tributary Valbona. In a broader sense, the Accursed Mountains also include the mountain ranges to Mitrovica with the Hajla and Mokna massifs. Some authors, however, see the river Lim as the northern boundary of the Accursed Mountains in geological terms.

From Lake Skadar, the mountains stretch northeast along the Cem river then curve slightly to the east in the direction of Gjeravica summit above the western Kosovo (450m) basin. From here, the Accursed Mountains turn northwards over the Bogićevica massif and Čakor pass and continue with another row of mountains. The Accursed Mountains finish in the area of upper Ibar River valley near Mitrovica, just after the Suva Planina (1,750 metres (5,740 ft)) massif that encircles Dukagjin basin from the north and northwest.

The Accursed Mountains are ethnographically and sociologically diverse with many tribes living in the region as sheep herders. Names of various Albanian tribes (Hoti, Gruda, Kelmendi, Kastrati, Dukagjini, Shkreli, Shala, Nikaj, Krasniqi, Gashi, Kuči and Rugova) refer to their geographical locations within the range.

On the Montenegrin side of this mountain range, on the rock wall of the summit Koplje, there's a rock climbing route which is the most difficult in this region. The route is called "Prvo Koplje" and its first ascent was made by the alpinists Žarko Gostović (1950-2019) from Skopje, North Macedonia and Ante Bedalov (1952-1974) from Kaštel Kambelovac, Croatia. The two climbed this route starting from 15 June 1972, and finishing the ascent on 18 June 1972, needing three and a half days to finish this first ascent.

== Geology ==
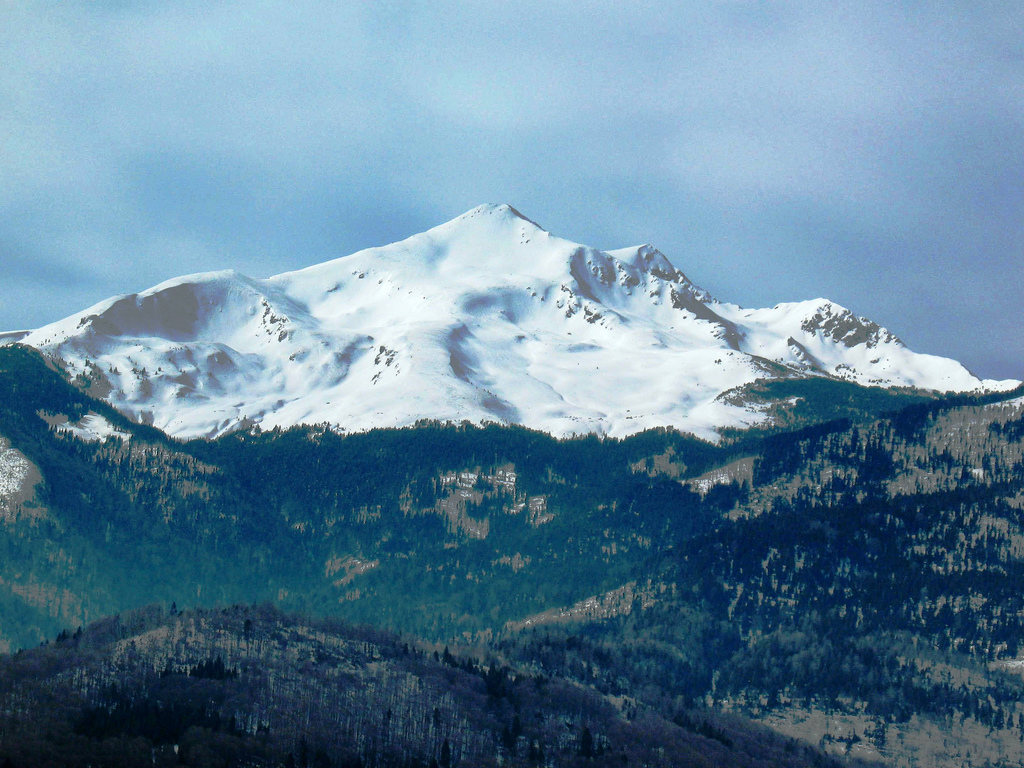
Gjeravica, eastern face

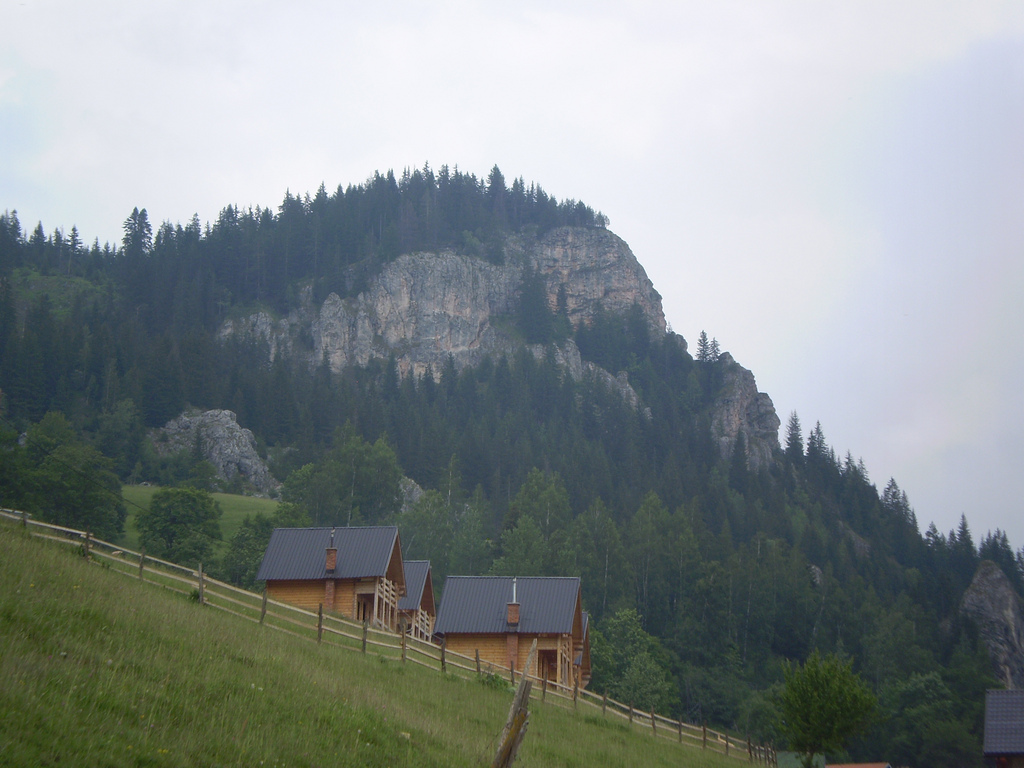
Ski resort of Bogë

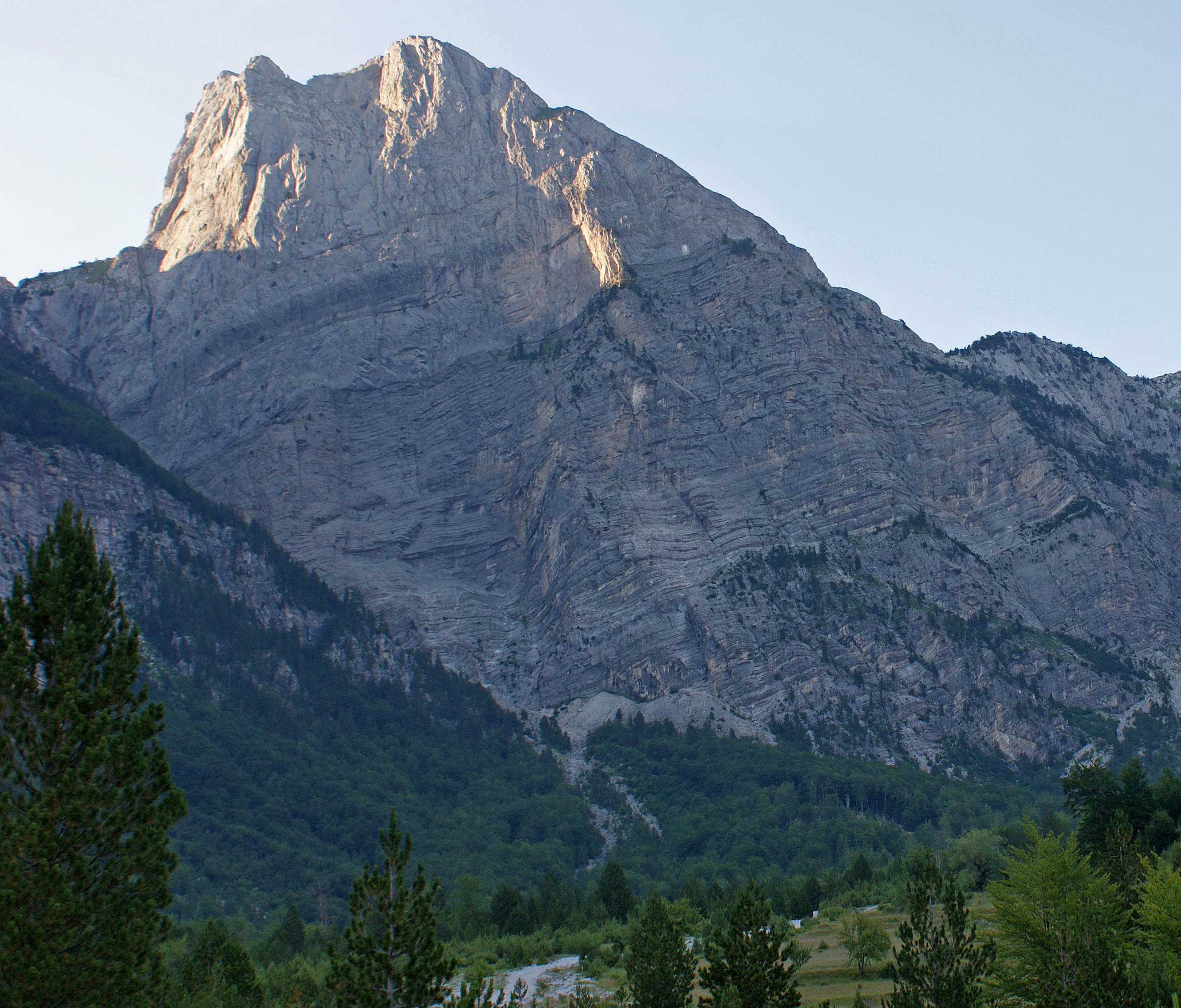
Maja e Harapit – 1000m south face, as seen from Thethi

The Accursed Mountains are a typical Dinaric karst high mountain range with a pronounced steep topography and glacial features. Maximum relief differences of 1,800 metres (5,900 ft) are found in the Valbona, Grbaja and Ropojani and Cem valleys. Overhanging walls and ridges forming pointed peaks are typical of the western and central Accursed Mountains. The eastern mountains are less rugged with lower relief. The valleys show characteristic effects of Pleistocene glaciation. Most of the area was modified by glacial activity with karstic areas in the western parts.

The range was formed by the folding resulting from the collision of the African and Eurasian plates. Nowhere in the Balkans have glaciers left so much evidence of erosion. After the Alps, these mountains are the most glaciated in Europe south of the Scandinavian ice sheet. They have very steep limestone slopes with abundant karst features. The Accursed Mountains are a large, rugged, pathless range. It is one of the rare mountain ranges in Europe that has not been explored entirely.

In some areas, the Accursed Mountains run almost parallel with the Šar Mountains in North Macedonia, Albania and Kosovo. This tectonic crash produced the unusual zig-zag shape of the range and also their curving from the dominant Dinaric northwestern – southeastern direction toward the northeastern one. In the western and central parts of the range the composition of the mountains is of mainly uniform with Mesozoic limestones and dolomites of the Jurassic and Cretaceous ages. In the eastern Accursed Mountains in addition to the limestone and dolomite series, there are rocks from the late Palaeozoic and Triassic periods, medium-Triassic volcanic rocks and Jurassic metamorphic rocks.

The Kalktafel is cut deeply with valleys in a variety of rock blocks of the mountains north of Përroi i Thatë, the Biga e Gimajive south of it, the Jezerca block between Shala and Valbona valley, the massif of the Maja e Hekurave, the plateau of the Maja e Kolats north of Valbona and Shkëlzen northeast of Valbona. The valleys were formed by glaciers which created very steep walls and hollows up to 1,000 metres (3,300 ft) deep. The south wall of the Maja Harapit is 800 metres (2,600 ft) high, making it the highest rock face on the Balkan Peninsula.

Although some scientific research gives the Accursed Mountains the status of a separate mountain chain, in most other ways this chain is still considered the highest of all Dinaric areas, connected with the Dinaric mountain chain in terms of geology, morphology, and ethnography.

=== Massifs ===
The Accursed Mountains are made up of many large sections or mountain massifs/groups, all of which are connected to one another. These massifs include the Popluks group with a height of 2,694 m (8,839 ft), the Shkurt group at 2,554 m (8,379 ft), the Radohimës group at 2,570 m (8,430 ft), the Zaborës e Krasniçës at 2,625 m (8,612 ft), the Bjelic group at 2,556 m (8,386 ft), the Karanfili-Brada group at 2,554 m (8,379 ft), the Rabës group at 2,232 m (7,323 ft), the Ershellit group at 2,066 m (6,778 ft), the Kakinjes group at 2,359 m (7,740 ft), the Shkëlzen group at 2,407 m (7,897 ft), the Bogićevica group at 2,533 m (8,310 ft), the Horolac group at 2,199 m (7,215 ft), the Kershi Kocaj group at 2,399 m (7,871 ft), the Maja e Zezë group at 2,400 m (7,900 ft), the Lumbardhit group at 2,522 m (8,274 ft), the Kopranik group at 2,460 m (8,070 ft), the Strellc group at 2,377 m (7,799 ft), the Gjeravica group at 2,656 m (8,714 ft), the Junik group at 2,296 m (7,533 ft), the Starac-Qokorr group 2,426 m (7,959 ft), the Hajla group at 2,403 m (7,884 ft), the Stedim-Ahmica group at 2,272 m (7,454 ft), the Zleb-Rusulija group at 2,382 m (7,815 ft), the Mokna group at 2,155 m (7,070 ft) and the Suva Planina group at 1,750 m (5,740 ft).

=== Canyons and valleys ===
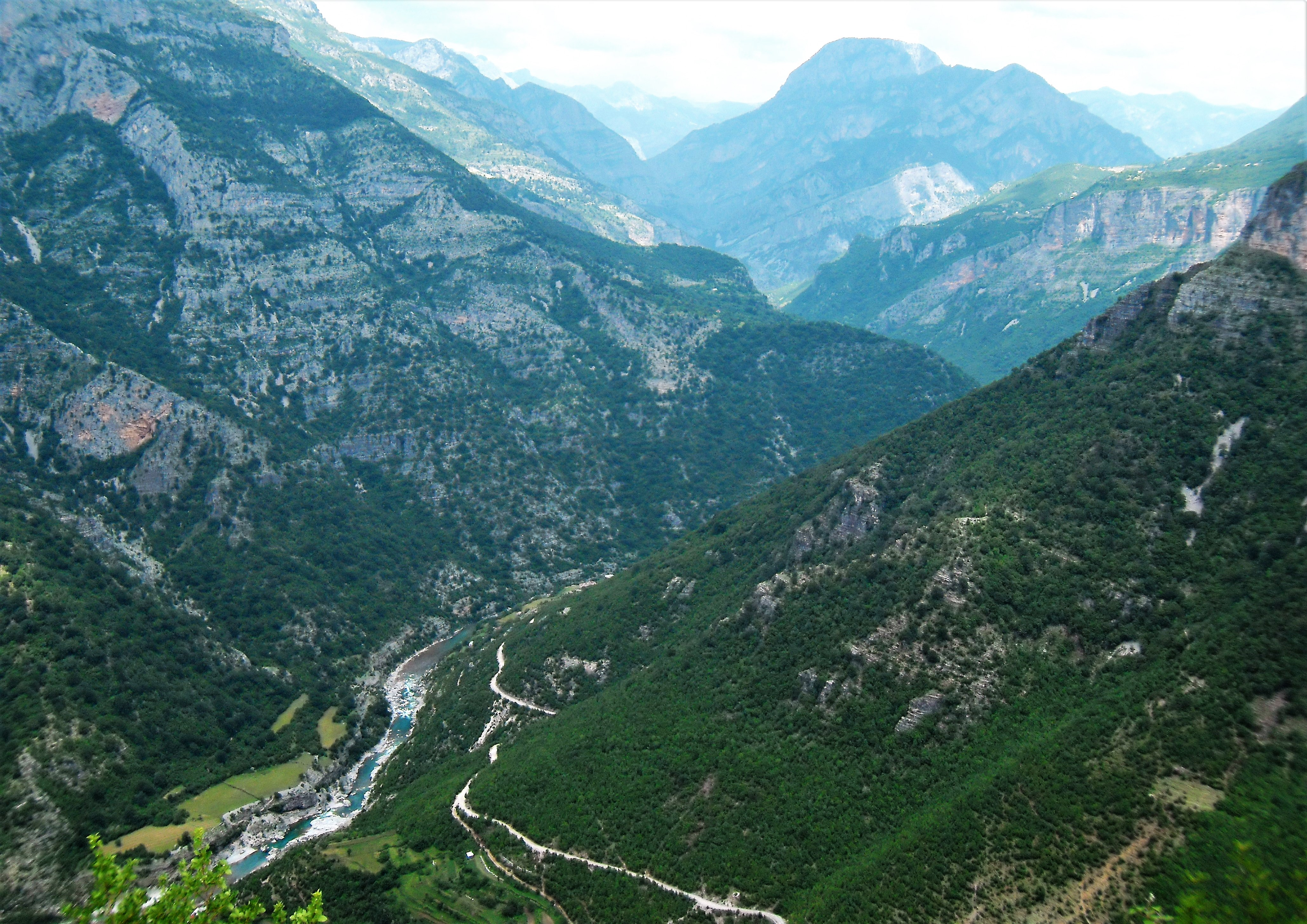
Tamara Gorge in Albania

Erosion during glaciation left many telltale features behind. Deep river canyons and flat valleys wind around the ridges of the mountains. The largest canyon is Rugova Canyon. It is situated in Kosovo and is 25 km (16 mi) long from the border with Montenegro to Peja and is 1,000 m (3,281 ft) deep. It has very steep vertical mountain slopes on both sides. Valleys common at lower altitudes are found at the alpine level, creating mountain passes and valley troughs, such as Buni Jezerce in Albania. Buni Jezerce means "Valley of the Lakes" and it contains six small glacial lakes, the biggest being called the Big lake of Buni Jezerce.

Canyons in the Accursed Mountains

- Rugova Canyon
- Deçani Canyon
- Gashi Canyon
- Cemi Canyon

Valleys in the Accursed Mountains

- Vermosh Valley
- Valbona Valley
- Thethi Valley
- Ropojona Valley
- Gerbja Valley
- Buni Jezerce
- Cemi i Nikçit Valley

== Rivers and lakes ==
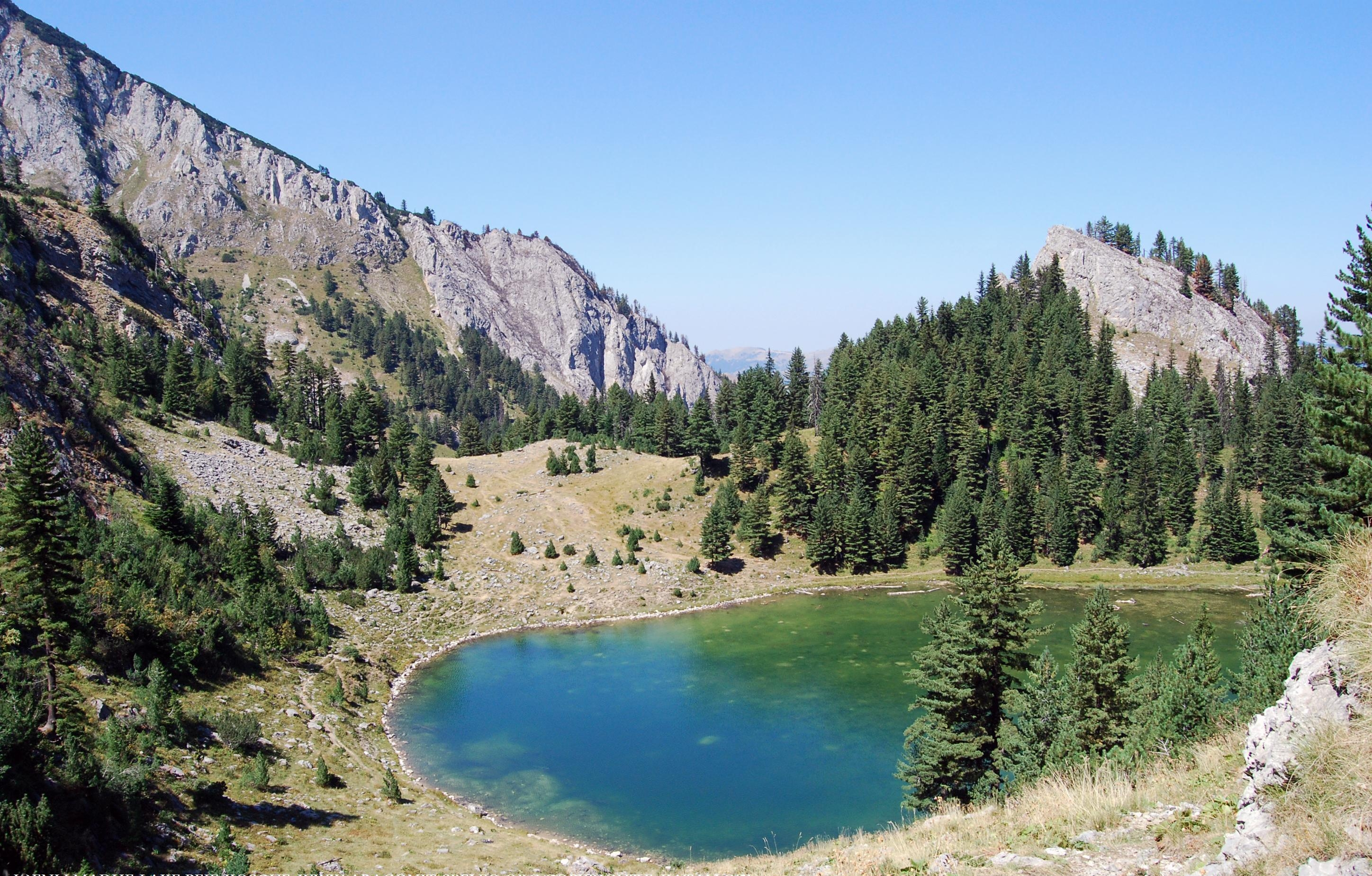
Lake Liqenat

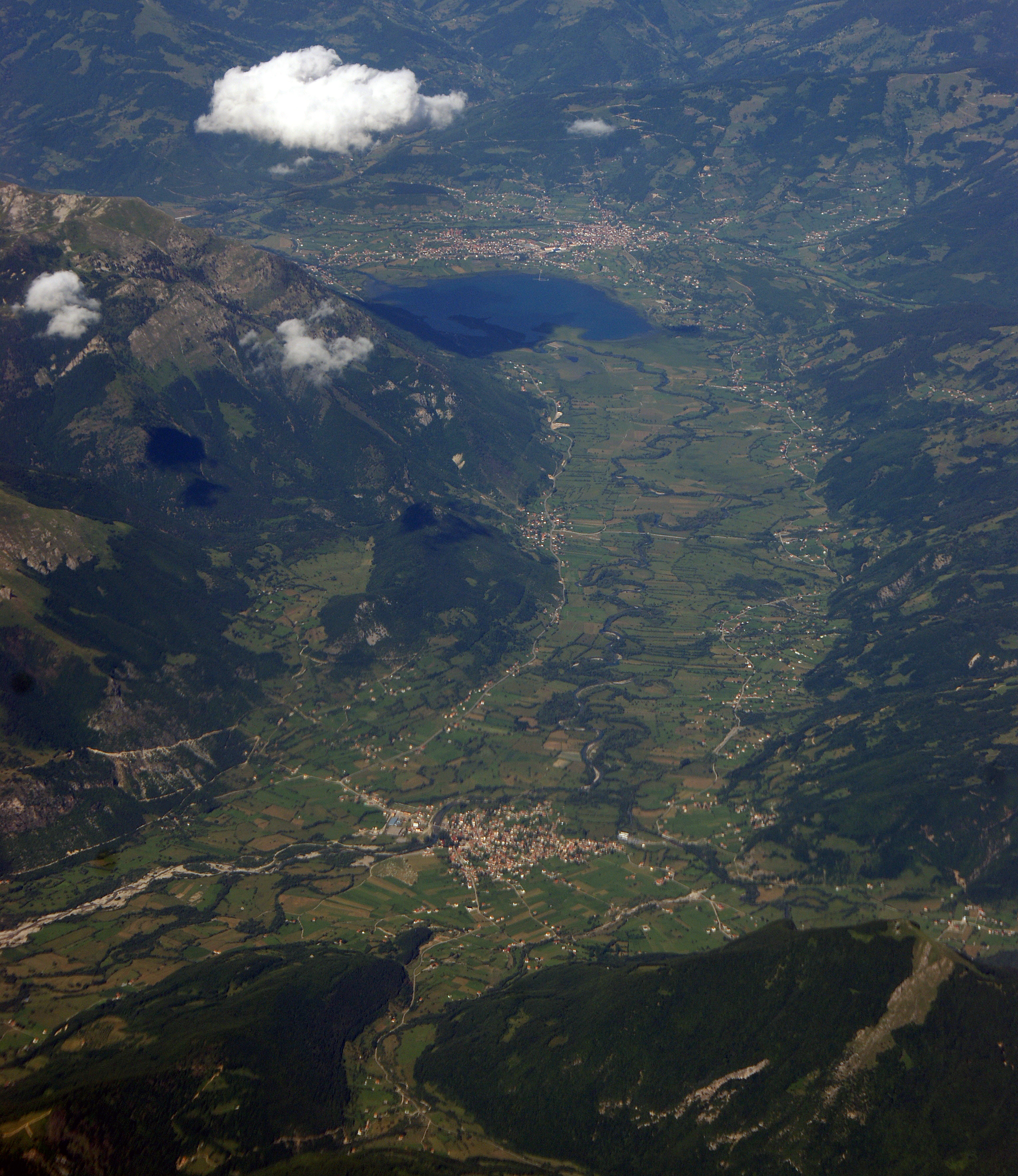
Lake Plav

The Accursed Mountains contain several notable rivers of the region. Rivers in this range fall roughly into two main categories, those that flow into the Lim and those that enter the White Drin and meet the Black Drin downstream at the Drin confluence. The southern and eastern slopes of the Accursed Mountains fall into the latter category. The Tara and Lim rivers, two major sources of the Dinaric river system, originate on the northern borders of the Accursed Mountains. The Vërmosh originates in the northwest mountainous part in Montenegro, close to the border with Albania. As a tributary of the Drina it drains into the Danube and then into the Black Sea. The Lim flows through the Plav lake. The Ibar, which originates on the slopes of the Hajla, takes a similar route into the Danube via the West Morava in Serbia.

In the southern Accursed Mountains, the Drin dominates. It drains most of the ranges with its tributaries and when measured from the source of the White Drin in Radavc to the mouth of the Drin near Lezha, it is 335 km (208 mi) long. However, not all of the Drin flows near or parallel to the Accursed Mountains. One Drin tributary is the Valbona, which drains into the Adriatic Sea, and its eastern tributary the Gashi River. To the west of the mountains is the Cem, which drains the northwestern part of the Montenegrin-Albanian border area to the Adriatic. Water levels fluctuate because the karst topography drains the water underground. Some rivers or streams, such as Përroi i Thatë in Albania, dry out completely during the summer droughts. Although the Lumbardhi i Pejës river in Kosovo is short, it is very powerful and carved the Rugova Canyon.

There are about 20 small alpine lakes of glacial origin in the Accursed Mountains. Many lakes are in the Bogiçevica border area between Kosovo and Albania and the Buni i Jezercë trough near the Jezerca and Bojs peaks. Some lakes, such as Lake Liqenat in Kosovo and Hrid Lake in Montenegro, are tourist attractions. Hrid Lake is a clear example of a well-preserved glacial relief. In the Pleistocene period this was a collection area for ice that fell down over steps of rock from surrounding peaks, dragging with it heterogeneous material. Precipitation washed away smaller rocks, but larger ones remain on the southwestern and western lake shore. The lake is 295 m (968 ft) long, 110 m (360 ft) wide and about 5 m (16 ft) deep on average. In addition to precipitation, it receives water from sources near its shores. The largest lake is Lake Plav in Montenegro. The lake lies at an altitude of 906 m (2,972 ft) above sea level in the Plav valley, nestled between the Accursed Mountains and the Visitor range.

Waterfalls are found in some parts of the range. The White Drin Waterfall in Kosovo reaches a height of 25 m (82 ft). Because it is not far from Peja, it is easily accessible and frequented by many visitors. The Grunas Waterfall in Albania is 30 m (98 ft) high and is in the Theth National Park. The Ali Pasha natural springs in Montenegro near Gusinje are the premium attraction for the town.

== Highest peaks ==
Peaks over 2,600 m (8,530 ft)

- Maja Jezercë (2,694 m or 8,839 ft; in Albania)
- Gjeravica (2,656 m or 8,714 ft; in Kosovo)
- Maja Grykat e Hapëta (2,625 m or 8,612 ft; in Albania)

Peaks over 2,500 m (8,202 ft)

- Maja e Radohimës (2,570 m or 8,432 ft; in Albania)
- Maja e Popllukës (2,569 m or 8,428 ft; in Albania)
- Maja Briaset (2,567 m or 8,422 ft; in Albania)
- Maja e Hekurave (2,561 m or 8,402 ft; in Albania)
- Rodi e Kollatës (2,556 m or 8,386 ft; in Albania)
- Maja e Shënikut (2,554 m or 8,379 ft; in Albania)
- Maja Tat (2,543 m or 8,343 ft; in Albania)
- Gusan (2,539 m or 8,330 ft; in Albania and Kosovo)
- Zla Kolata/Kollata e Keqe (2,534 m or 8,314 ft; in Albania and Montenegro)
- Marijaš/Marijash (2,533 m or 8,310 ft; in Albania and Montenegro)
- Dobra Kolata/Kolata e Mirë (2,524 m or 8,281 ft; in Albania and Montenegro)
- Maja e Rosit (2,524 m or 8,281 ft; in Montenegro)
- Guri i Kuq (2,522 m or 8,274 ft; in Kosovo)
- Maja e Vishnjes (2,517 m or 8,258 ft; in Albania)
- Maja Kokervhake (2,508 m or 8,228 ft; in Albania)
- Maja e Ropës (2,502 m or 8,209 ft; in Kosovo)

Peaks over 2,400 m (7,874 ft)

- Maja Shkurt (2,499 m or 8,199 ft; in Albania)
- Maja Reshkullit (2,496 m or 8,189 ft; in Albania)
- Maja e Malësores (2,490 m or 8,169 ft; in Albania)
- Karanfili (Veliki Vrh, Kremeni Vrh, Maja Gurt e Zjarmit) (2,490 m or 8,169 ft; in Montenegro)
- Maja e Ragamit (2,472 m or 8,110 ft; in Albania)
- Maja Bojs (2,461 m or 8,074 ft; in Albania)
- Koprivnik/Kopranik (2,460 m or 8,071 ft; in Kosovo)
- Maja Vukoces (2,450 m or 8,038 ft; in Albania)
- Maja e Bardhë (2,426 m or 7,959 ft; in Albania and Kosovo)
- Veternik (2,410 m or 7,907 ft; in Albania)
- Shkëlzen (2,407 m or 7,897 ft; in Albania)
- Maja e Thatë (2,406 m or 7,894 ft; in Albania)
- Pasji Peak (2,405 m or 7,890 ft; in Kosovo and Montenegro)
- Maja Bogiçaj (2,404 m or 7,887 ft; in Albania and Kosovo)
- Hajla (2,403 m or 7,884 ft; in Kosovo and Montenegro)

Peaks under 2,400 m (7,874 ft)

- Rusolia (2,382 m or 7,815 ft)
- Strellc (2,377 m or 7,799 ft)
- Trekufiri (2,366 m or 7,762 ft)
- Žljeb (2,365 m or 7,759 ft)
- Maja e Kakisë (2,360 m or 7,743 ft)
- Liqenat (2,341 m or 7,680 ft)
- Rrasa e Zogut (2,305 m or 7,562 ft)
- Hajla e Vëranocit (2,281 m or 7,484 ft)
- Junik (2,280 m or 7,480 ft)
- Maja e Brevinës (2,259 m or 7,411 ft)
- Maja Stogut (2,246 m or 7,369 ft; in Albania)
- Maja e Elbunit (2,231 m or 7,320 ft)
- Biga e Shalës (2,230 m or 7,316 ft)
- Deçan Mountain (2,200 m or 7,218 ft)
- Maja Harapit (2,218 m or 7,277 ft)
- Maja Trojan (2,190 m or 7,185 ft)
- Pogled (2,155 m or 7,070 ft)
- Maja Dramadol (2,120 m or 6,955 ft)
- Beleg (2,102 m or 6,896 ft)
- Maja e Ershellit (2,067 m or 6,781 ft)
- Maja e Vjelakut (2,014 m or 6,608 ft)
- Hajla e Shkrelit (2,011 m or 6,598 ft)
- Maja e Madhe (2,011 m or 6,598 ft)
- Maja e Grebenit (1,864 m or 6,115 ft)
- Lice Mountain (1,799 m or 5,902 ft)
- Maja e Veleçikut (1,725 m or 5,659 ft)

== Climate ==
The Accursed Mountains are on the whole the wettest area of Europe. In the village of Boga in the valley, precipitation is 3,033 mm (119.4 in) per year, and otherwise 2,000 to 2,500 mm (79 to 98 in) per year is normal. At higher elevations snow is found even in summer, except in very dry years.

=== Glaciation ===
There are at least five active glaciers that probably formed during the late Holocene period, and some inactive glaciers between 1,980 and 2,420 meters high. The trough valleys of Ropojani, Grbaja and Valbona were carved by kilometres of glaciers during the last ice age. Detailed geomorphological mapping was used to reconstruct the positions of former glaciers. The longest glacier of Ropojana had a length of 12.5 kilometres (7.8 mi) and a surface area of 20 square kilometres (7.7 mi^{2}); others include Valbona glacier at 9.5 kilometres (5.9 mi) and 10.5 square kilometres (4.1 mi^{2}), Grbaja Glacier at 5 kilometres (3.1 mi) and 6.7 square kilometres (2.6 mi^{2}) and Bogićevića Glacier at 6 kilometres (3.7 mi) and6.9 square kilometres (2.7 mi^{2}). In addition, there are about 20 small lakes of glacial origin as described above, including the Buni Jezercë group of lakes on the northern side of the Jezerca Peak, the Ridsko Lake, the Bukumirsko Lake and the Rikavačko Lake.

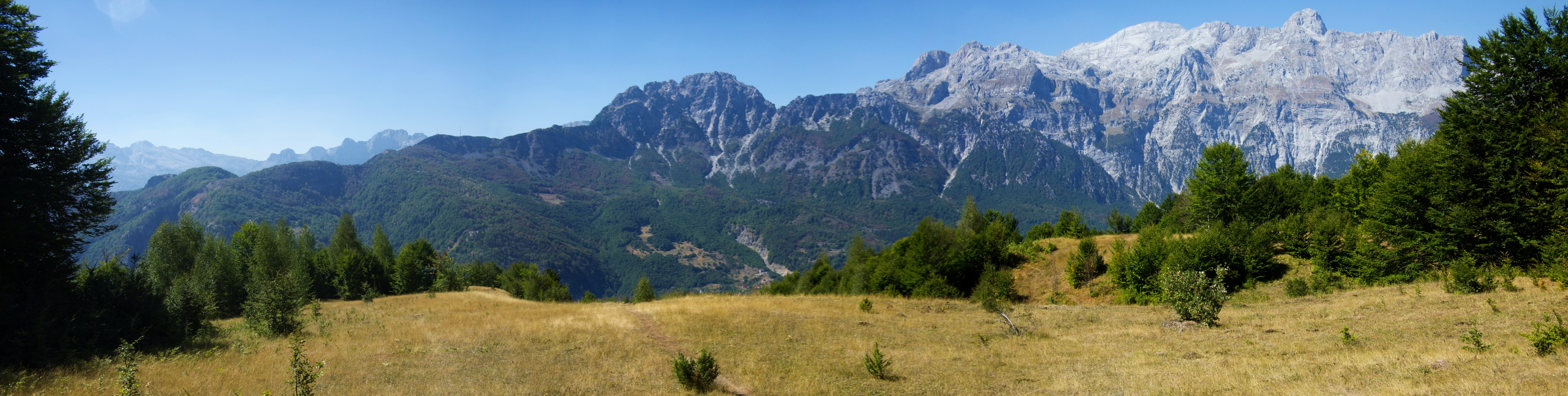
Panorama of Thethi mountains in Albania.

A recent report from geographers at the University of Manchester details the discovery of four previously unknown glaciers in the Albanian part of the mountain range at 1980–2100 m high, found in the area close to Maja e Jezerces. The glaciers, the largest of which is currently the size of six football pitches, vary in size every year according to the amount of winter snowfall and temperatures during the following summer. Their average total surface area is 5 hectares (0.019 mi^{2}). Glacier-climate modeling suggests that these glaciers require annual accumulation of between 4,137 and 5,531 mm (162.9 and 217.8 in) (rainfall equivalent) to balance melting, which would correspond to between 49.7 and 66.4 metres (163.1 and 217.8 ft) of snow. A significant proportion of this accumulation is likely to be sourced from windblown snow and, in particular, avalanching snow. It is estimated that the total accumulation needed to balance melting is potentially up to twice the amount accumulated from direct precipitation. The presence of these glaciers, amongst the southernmost in Europe, at altitudes well below the regional snow line highlights the importance of local controls on glacier development. The geographers think at least eight glaciers were present in neighbouring mountains during the 19th century, correlating with the culmination of the Little Ice Age in the European Alps.

== Flora ==
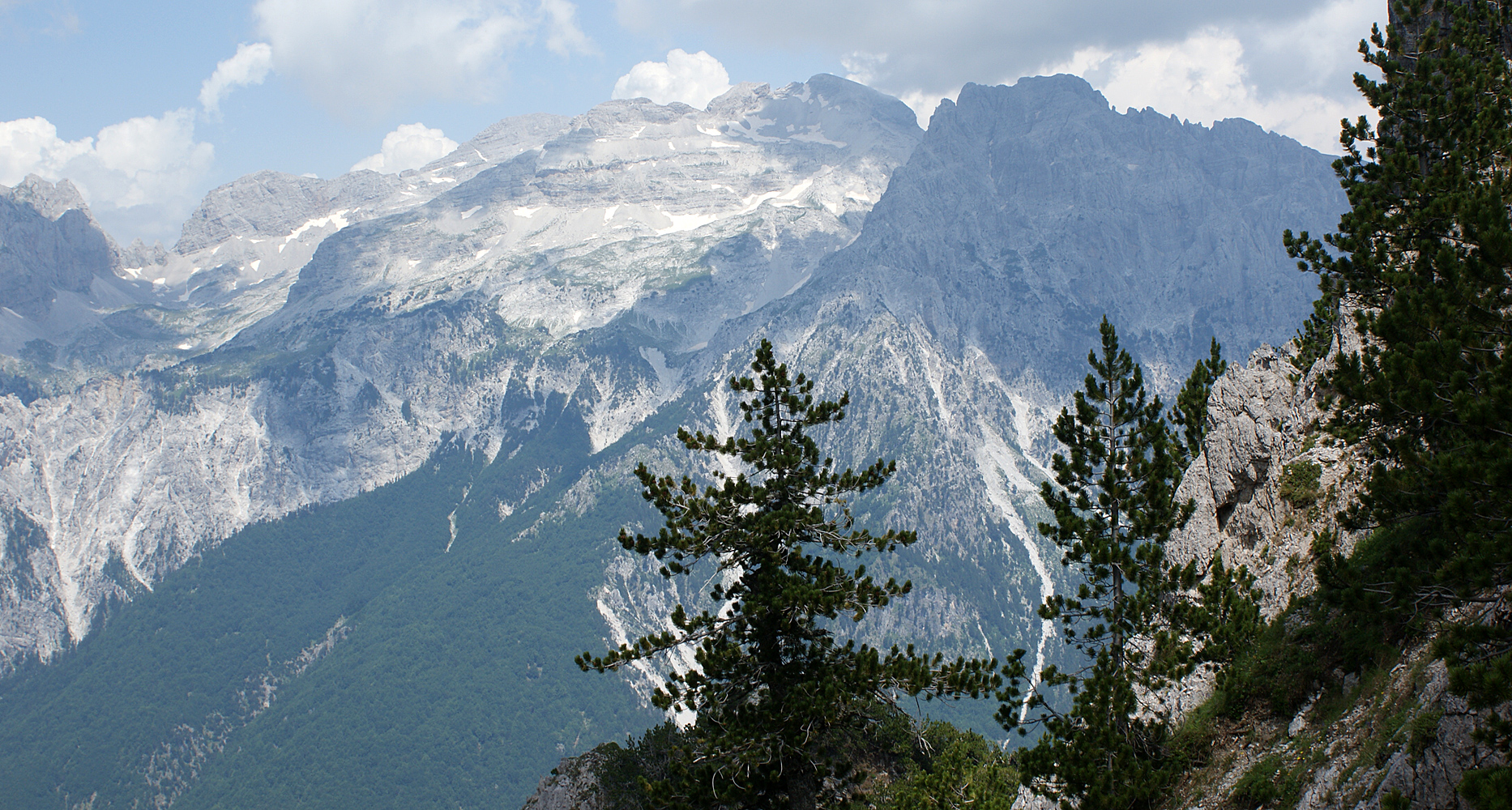
Pinus heldreichii in front of Popluks and Jezerca peaks

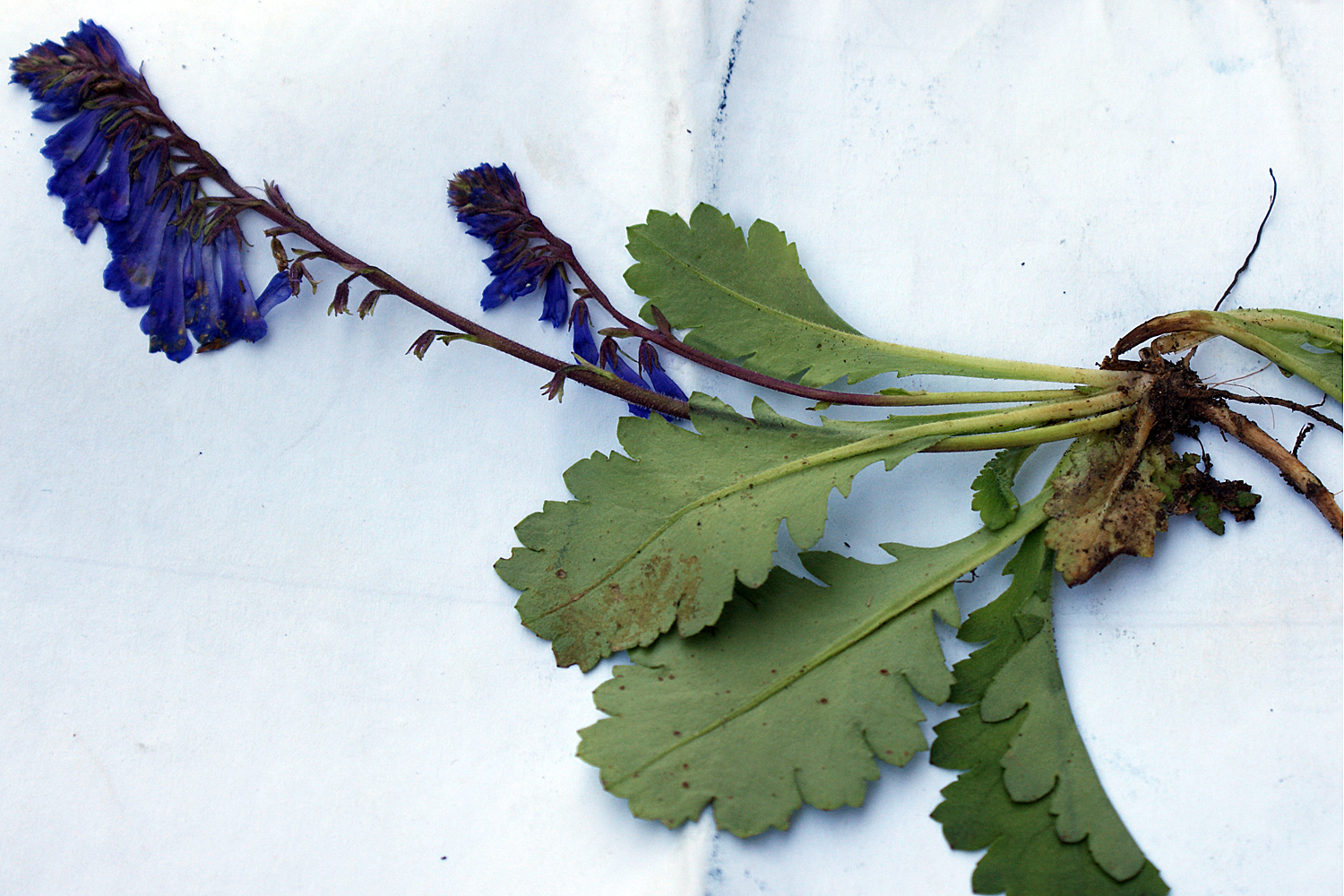
Wulfenia baldaccii, an endemic species

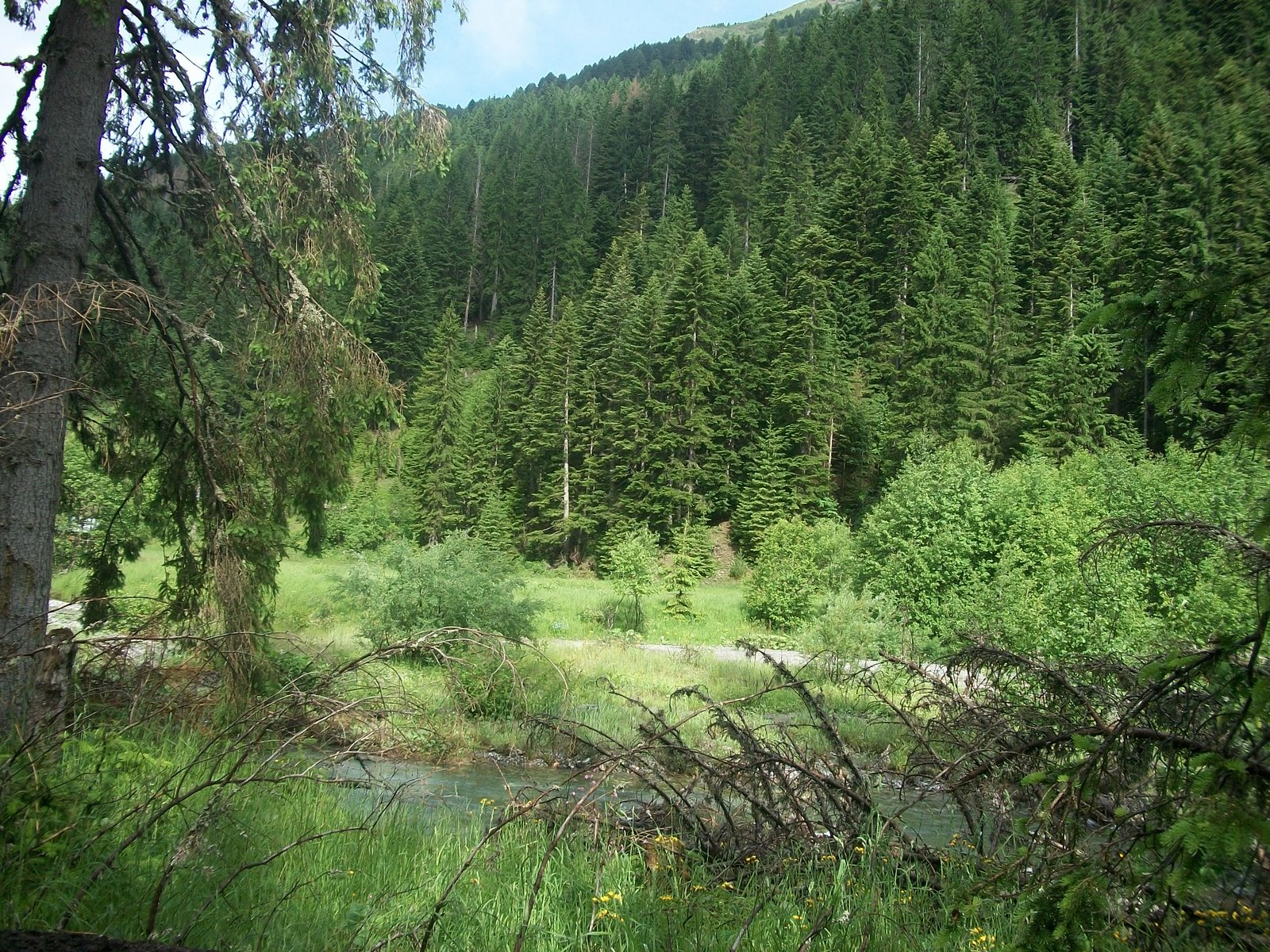
Ancient forests around Gjeravica

The vegetation of the Accursed Mountains is among the richest on the Balkan Peninsula and one of the main central European regions for flora. To date, 1,611 wild plants have been described in the Albanian part alone. As of 2013 50 flora species are endemic, sub-endemic and endangered plant species. The southern edge of mountains have a sub-Mediterranean character. Various evergreen bushes are found in the deepest valleys of the canyons and sunny slopes, and in the higher valleys deciduous Shibljak shrubs are common. In the mountains over 100 medicinal herbs are found, including species of the genus Primula, Satureja and Sideritis. Because of its altitude and its favored habitat, the range is one of the centers of arcto-alpine relict flora of the Balkan Peninsula. Out of 77 arcto-alpine species of former glacial flora on the Balkan Peninsula, a little over 50 species can be found in the Accursed Mountains.

The levels of vegetation in the Accursed Mountains meet the alpine level, from upland valleys through the montane mountain stage on forest-free alpine and subalpine mats and subnivale tundra caused by permafrost in vast heaps of rubble with raw soils. A real snow level is not widely spread, although in the high altitudes snow and fern fields can also keep during the summer on four very small glaciers at high altitudes, the highest one found in the shade of Jezerca.

Beech, fir and silicate spruce forests dominate the mountain areas. Rarely, however, the Northern Europe species are found, typically the Scots pine (Pinus sylvestris). The drought-resistant Mediterranean-sized black pine (Pinus nigra) is also common. Aspens (Populus tremula) grow in damp sites alongside mountain maple (Acer pseudoplatanus) and Norway spruce (Picea abies). The Accursed Mountains are one of the southernmost areas where spruce grow in Europe. The "combat zones" of the forest are formed with dense thickets of mountain pine (Pinus mugo. Conifers like the snakeskin pine (Pinus heldreichii) are on carbonate rocks and the Macedonian pine (Pinus peuce) of silicates are typical elements of the endemic Balkan flora.

A cushion-sedge and blue grass lawn of (Seslerion juncifoliae) grows in alpine areas and, on shallow limestone soils, Oxytropidion dinaricae, to which the alpine grass krumm grows as in the Alps. Other plants include Alpine aster Aster alpinus, edelweiss Leontopodium alpinum and white mountain avens Dryas octopetala. These plants are atypical alpine plants specially adapted to the short growing season, UV radiation, cold and thin soils.

The flora in the rocky areas of the Accursed Mountains are particularly noteworthy, because they are rare rich and endemic species, including the Tertiary relic Amphoricarpos neumayeri. Many species of flora are either endemic or are mainly found in the Accursed Mountains. A plantain (Plantaginaceae) is found in the central Accursed Mountains as a variant of the alpine Wulfenie, but 700 km away it does not grow. Petasites doerfleri is only found on the Jezerca peaks, and the Albanian lily Lilium albanicum and Viola ducagjinica are only found at the top of the Maja Radohimës slope. Also noteworthy is the Viola vilaensis. Viola chelmea is a violet species that occur on the Montenegrin-Albanian border area, especially at the lake Bukumirsko Jezero at 2,100 meters, and are only found on Asia Minor and the Balkans where they can grow due to woody, robust rhizome, cleistogamous flowers, and a lack of foothills. The Accursed Mountains are also the only European area where the Tertiary relic Forsythia europaea grow.

== Fauna ==
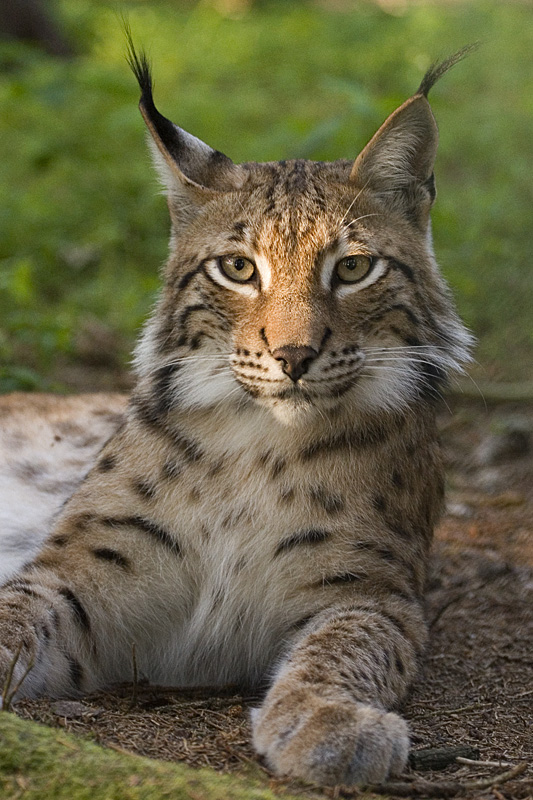
Lynx are some of the largest predators in the area

Large mammal species that have long been extinct in other regions are found here, such as the Eurasian brown bear, grey wolf, golden jackal, red fox, European wildcat, roe deer, fallow deer, red deer, wild boar and European otter. The highly endangered Balkan lynx, a subspecies of the Eurasian lynx, is mainly found in the Theth National Park where about roughly 20–50 individuals still roam, though poaching is still a large threat. Chamois are found throughout the high altitudes; about 720 chamois live between the borders of Kosovo and Montenegro. There is speculation that the mouflon roamed the Accursed Mountains until World War I, when it disappeared.

Bird species include the golden eagle, snake eagle, honey buzzard, peregrine falcon, capercaillie, rock partridge, scops owl, Eurasian eagle owl and the snow finch. So far 140 species of butterflies have been found, which makes the Accursed Mountains the richest area in Europe for butterflies.

The rivers are home to a growing number of marble trout. Among the amphibians are the alpine salamander (southernmost habitat), fire salamander, yellow-bellied toad and fire-bellied toad. The rich herpetofauna include the Mosor rock lizard, Prokletije rock lizard, green lizard, Greek tortoise and snakes such as the true vipers, including the venomous horned viper and adder. The Accursed Mountains have one endemic species of lizard, the Prokletije rock lizard or Dinarolacerta montenegrina, named after the range.

== Early climbing ==
British climbers Sleeman, Elmalie and Ellwood were the first to reach the summit of Maja Jezercë on 26 July 1929. Years later Austrian mountaineers also scaled the summit. Many explorers and scientists have visited the Accursed Mountains, collecting rocks and samples to display in museums. Before any of these expeditions, the highest peak of the range was believed to be Shkëlzen at 2,407 m (7,897 ft) high, followed by Maja Radohimës at 2,570 m (8,432 ft). By early summer 1929 all the summits were measured by Italian geodetes.

== National parks ==
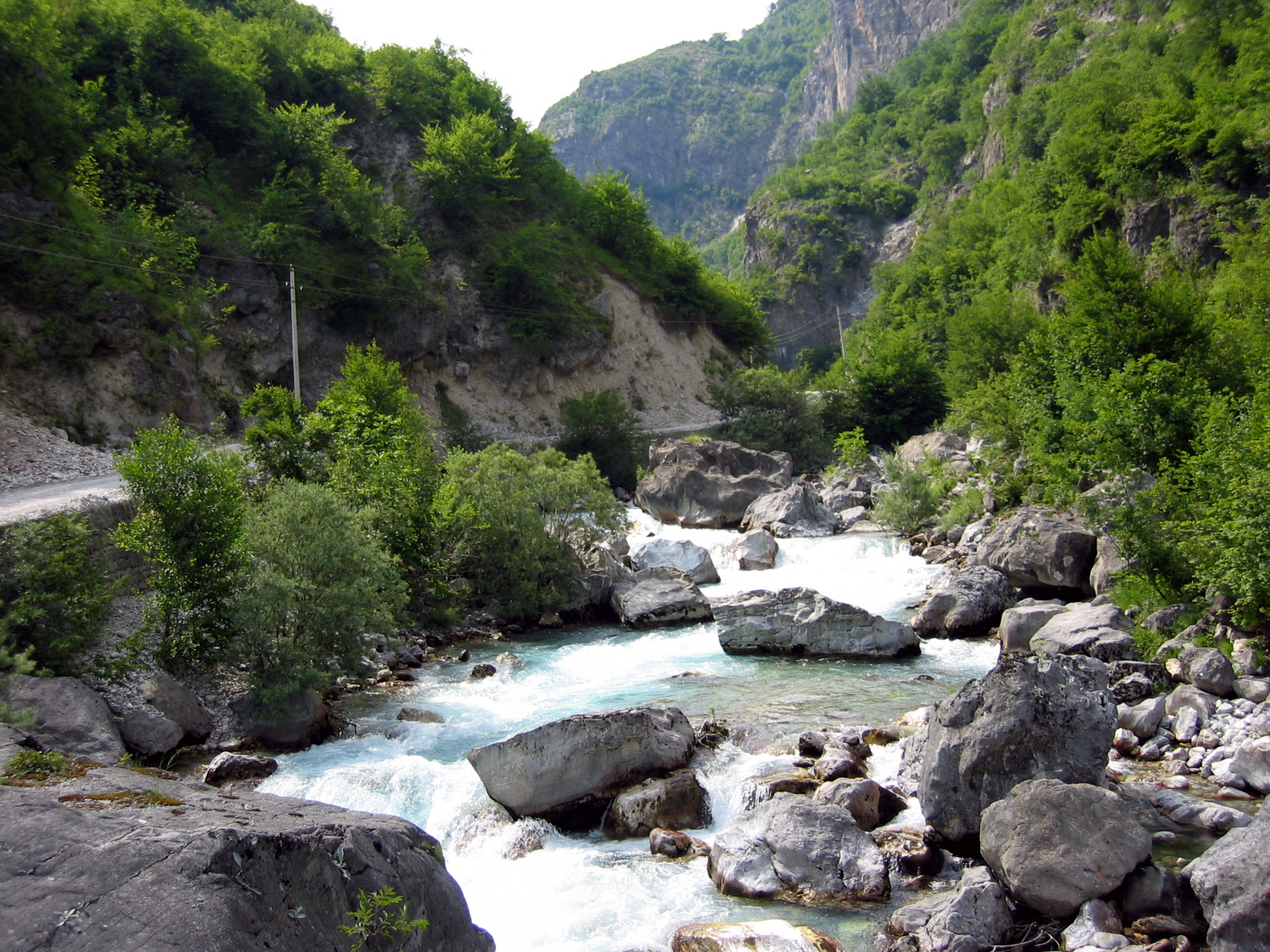
Valbona River in the former Valbona Valley National Park, now the Alps of Albania National Park

There are three national parks in the Accursed Mountains — one each in Montenegro, Kosovo, and Albania. Illegal deforestation is a major problem. To some extent even the national parks are affected. In dry summers forest fires are common. All the large mammals including wolves, chamois, foxes, badgers and wild boar are hunted without regard to national park boundaries.

In Albania, the new, enlarged Alps of Albania National Park was created in 2022, merging the former Theth National Park, Valbona Valley National Park and Gashi River Strict Nature Reserve, totaling a massive coverage area of 86,000 ha (330 mi^{2}). Theth National Park was designated in 1966 and covered area of 2,630 ha (10.2 mi^{2}) along the Thethi River. A major attraction in the park is the Grunas Waterfall. The Valbona Valley National Park was designated in 1996 and covered 8,000 ha (31 mi^{2}), including the Valbona Valley and the Valbona River.

The Montenegrin part of the mountain range was declared Prokletije National Park in 2009, comprising an area of 16,000 ha (62 mi^{2}). The Bjeshkët e Nemuna National Park on the Kosovar side was established in 2012 with an area of 50,000 ha (190 mi^{2}), covering the high alpine areas as well as the Rugova Canyon and important rivers. A part of Maja e Ropës mountain was declared a floral mountain reserve by Yugoslavia in 1955, covering an area of 25 ha (62 acres) of mainly Macedonian pine, pine and beech. In the same year the Kozhnjar area was declared a fauna reserve in particular to protect the chamois, covering an area of 161 ha (400 acres).

In 2010, Kosovo, Albania, and Montenegro proposed planning to create another tri-state park in the area that would be called the Balkans Peace Park.

== Settlement, economy and transport ==
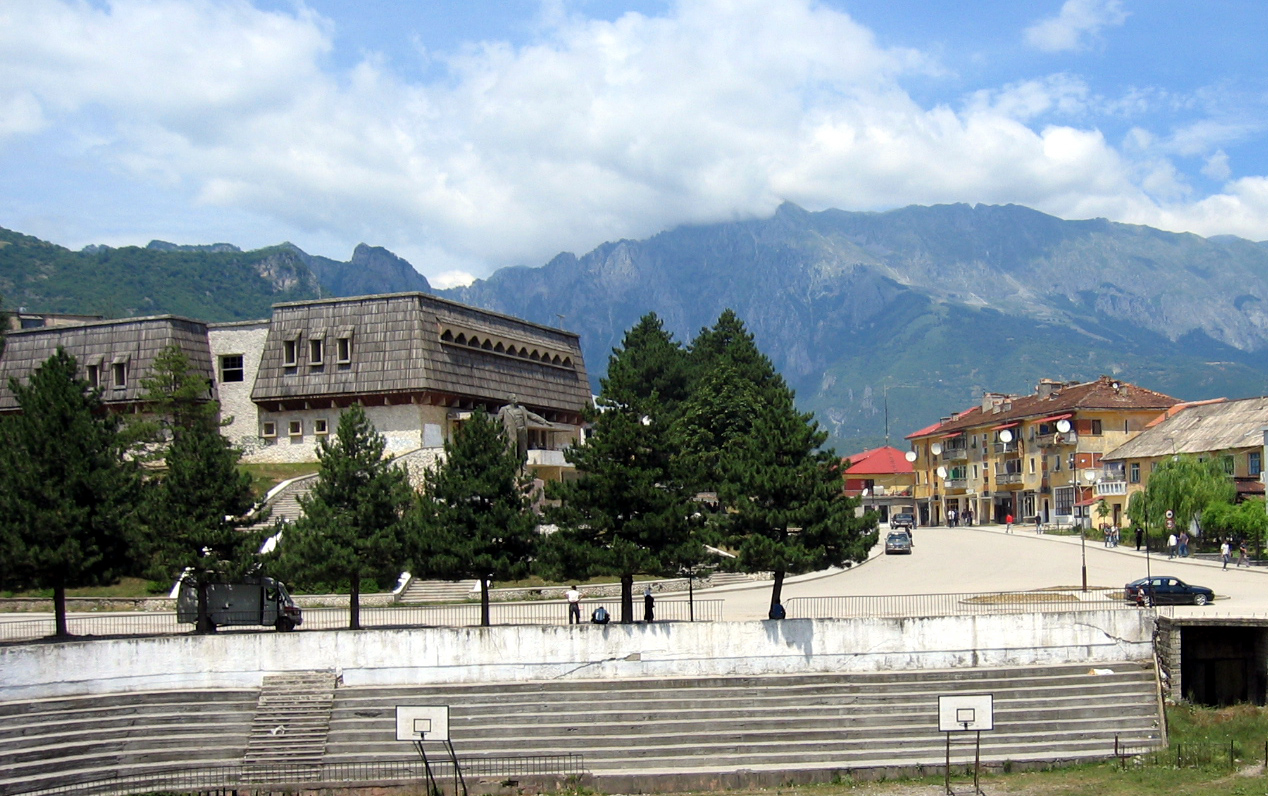
View from Bajram Curri of the mountains north of the city

The Accursed Mountains are home to Albanians, Montenegrins, Serbs and Bosniaks, but they are only very sparsely populated. At the edges there are some settlements: the Albanian Koplik and the Montenegrin Tuzi in the west near the Skadar Lake; Plav and Gusinje in of the northern valley of the upper Lim river in Montenegro and Bajram Curri, the main town of the district Tropoja, in the eastern part of the mountain range. Even the somewhat more distant, larger cities of Shkodra, Podgorica, Gjakova and Peja create their sphere of influence and are frequently visited by inhabitants of the highlands for errands, administrative procedures and market sales.

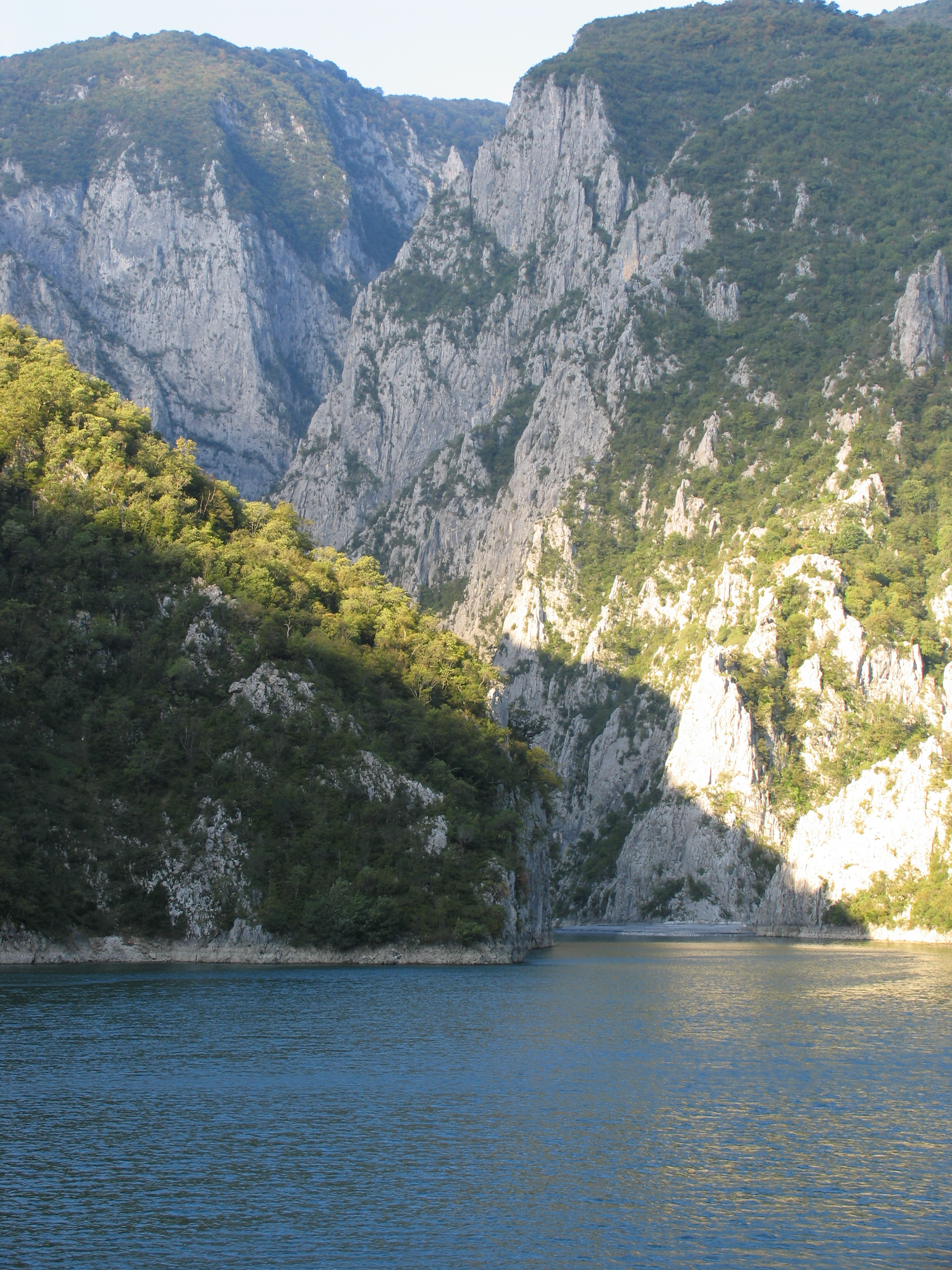
Koman Gorge serves as a transport route for ferries

In the mountains, villages only have up to a few hundred inhabitants. They are often scattered settlements without a clear core. Among the biggest are Tamara and Selca, both in the valley of the Cem and belonging to the community of the Kelmend. The community of eight villages – including Vermosh – comprises 6,600 inhabitants. Tamara is currently the only place in the central mountains with infrastructure such as a secondary school. Tamara and Vermosh share a maternity hospital. Until the collapse of communism there were such facilities, for example, in the Shala Valley. Many residents of the villages in the interior such as Boga, Theth or Valbona live there only in the summer months, as the villages are cut off for many weeks during winter.

In addition to the seasonal migration, the whole mountain area is suffering from a severe brain drain, as its income from agriculture is low. Many leave to seek work and a little more comfort in the region of Shkodra and Koplik, Tirana or abroad. As the year-round population dwindles as the terrain becomes less accessible, there are few state or local government employees such as teachers. Local income comes from agriculture, semi-illegal forestry and tourism.

In a few places like Theth tourism has been revitalized by recreational hiking. With the help of GTZ, 40 private houses (also referred to as guest houses, or han in Albanian) have been transformed into tourist accommodations or B&Bs. In 2010 there were 130 beds available in total – 100 more than in 2007. Additionally, hiking trails have been marked and trails maps and travel guides published. From 2006 to 2009, the number of tourists rose from 300 to around 7,500 per year. Unlike in the rest of Albania, the increase was due to foreign tourists. Lakes such as Plav and Hrid also receive many tourists during the summer months. In many villages there are small hydroelectric power plants that supply the village with electricity.

Many villages were already settled by the 15th century, and some valleys have been inhabited since the Stone Age. At the end of communism, however, several thousand people emigrated and depopulated the area.

=== Peaks of the Balkans ===
The Peaks of the Balkans Trail is a 192 km hiking route that loops through the three countries and can be hiked in about 10 days. The trail runs through developed valleys and remote high alpine regions. Backpackers can wild camp or sleep in guesthouses in villages. Border crossings do not take place at official crossing points, so the necessary documents must be obtained in advance.

The 10 segments are:

- Theth (Albania) – Valbona Pass – Rragam – Valbona: 13,9 km
- Valbona – Çerem: 19,8 km
- Çerem – Dobërdol: 15,64 km
- Dobërdol – Tromeđa – Alp Milishevc (Kosovo): 18,2 km
- Milishevc – Rugova Canyon – Reka e Allagës: 16,24 km
- Reka e Allagës – Rugova – Kuqishta (Čakorpass): 23,26 km
- Kuqishta (Kosovo) – Babino Polje (Montenegro): 15,8 km
- Babino Polje – Hrid – Plav: 20,31 km
- Plav, Montenegro – Bor (Berg) – Grlata – Vusanje: 27,4 km
- Vusanje (Montenegro) – Peja Pass – Theth: 21,35 km

=== Transport in Albania ===
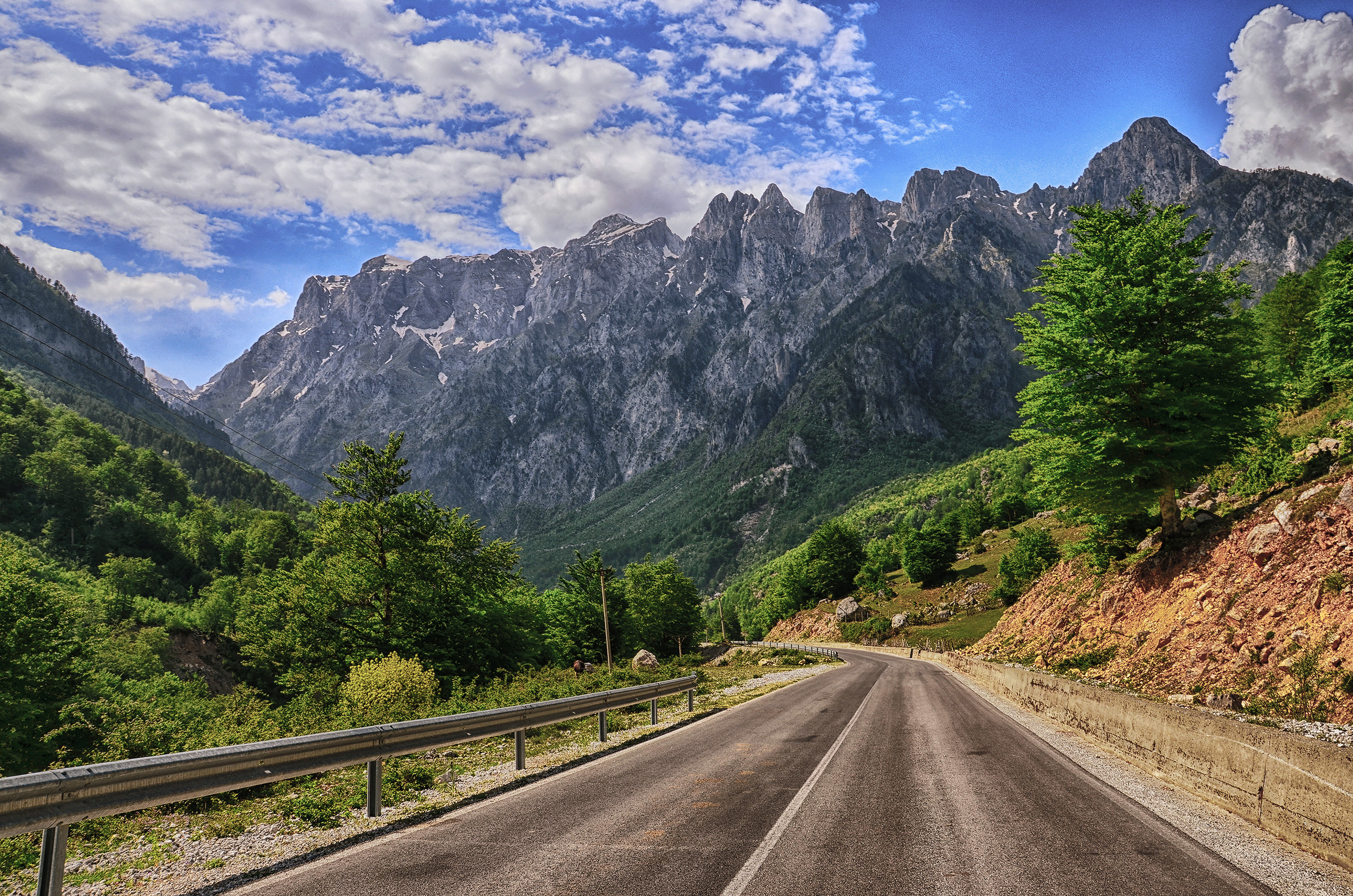
Azem Hajdari Highway in Valbona Valley, part of the Albanian Alps

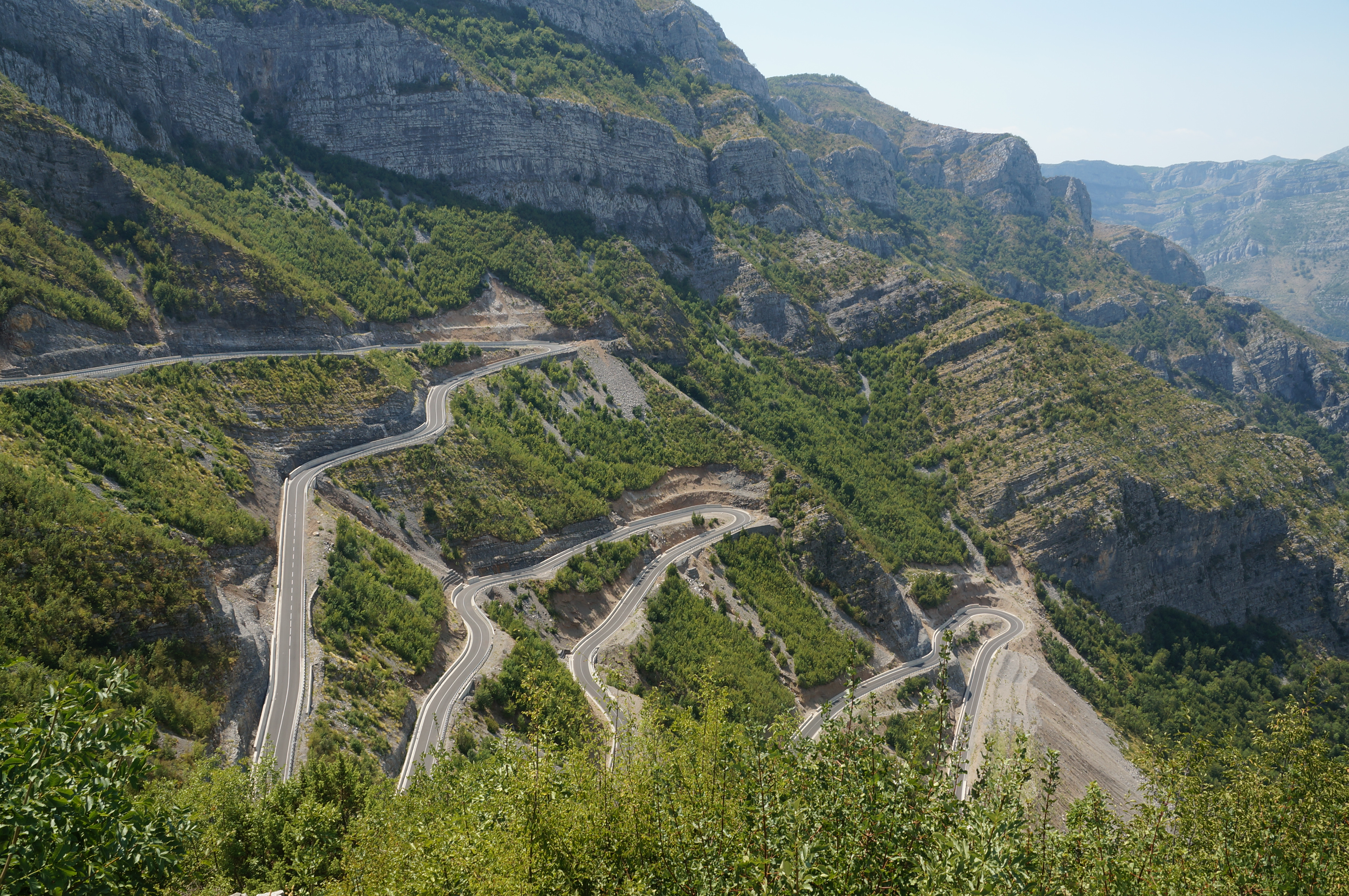
SH20 at Leqet e Hotit in Kelmend region

SH20 road crosses the Accursed Mountains in the Kelmend region of northwestern Albania, stretching from the eastern shore of Lake Scutari at the Han i Hotit border crossing with Montenegro, to the first pass into the valley of Cem. It then leads to the source elevation of the Qafa e Predelecit after Vermosh, followed by another border crossing, ending at Gusinje. As of 2015 the SH20 stretch between Hani Hotit and Tamare has been paved and upgraded to European standards.

From west to east, there is only the SH21 road recently paved from Koplik to Boga. The road from Qafa Thores leading to Theth has been recently paved with crash barriers and guard rails added, but is still steep, winding and narrow in places. From Theth, there is a bad track down to the Shala Valley Church and only a walking path along the river leads to Shkodra. SH22 road over the Qafa e Morinës at Bajram Curri after Gjakova has been reconstructed. In the past, the only route for crossing the border between Montenegro and Kosovo was via Rugova Canyon, which was very dangerous and steep. With the construction of the Peja–Rožaje highway the situation has greatly improved. In addition, SH42 road leading to Razem from SH21 has also been recently reconstructed.

Historically, a caravan route between Podgorica and Plav crossed the mountains along the Lim and Cem rivers.
