= Dog's Peak =

Mountain in Kosovo and Montenegro

- Location within Kosovo Location within Montenegro

Highest point
- Elevation: 2,406 m (7,894 ft)
- Coordinates: 42°35′53″N 20°04′40″E

Naming
- Native name: Albanian: Maja e Qenit

Geography
- Location: Accursed Mountains
- Countries: Kosovo; Montenegro

Dog's Peak (Albanian: Maja e Qenit; Montenegrin and Serbian: Пасји врх, Pasji vrh) is a mountain peak located on the border between Kosovo and Montenegro. It is 2,406 m (7,894 ft) high and is part of the Accursed Mountains range. This peak is one of the highest in the Bogićevica mountain area. One of Dog's Peak neighbours is Marijash, reaching 2,533 m (8,310 ft) and being the highest peak of Bogićevica.

== See also ==
- Accursed Mountains
