= Maja e Vishnjës =

Summit in Albania

- Maja e Dritës
- Location within Albania

Highest point
- Elevation: 2,517 m (8,258 ft)
- Prominence: 156 m (512 ft)
- Isolation: 3.9 km (2.4 mi)
- Coordinates: 42°26′04″N 19°44′10″E

Naming
- English translation: Cherry Peak

Geography
- Country: Albania
- Region: Albanian Alps
- Municipality: Malësi e Madhe
- Parent range: Accursed Mountains

Geology
- Rock age: Mesozoic
- Mountain type: summit
- Rock type: limestone

Maja e Vishnjës (lit. 'Cherry Peak'), formerly known as Maja e Dritës, is a summit in northern Albania, rising to an elevation of 2,517 m (8,258 ft) above sea level. It forms part of the Accursed Mountains range and is located approximately 6 km southeast of the village of Nikç.

The peak belongs to the Radohina mountain group, in the western section of the range and is the third-highest point of the massif.

== Etymology ==
At the summit stands a metal plaque installed in 1970, when the mountain’s name was officially changed from Maja e Vishnjës to Maja e Dritës ("Peak of Light"). The new name was adopted to mark the completion of Albania’s nationwide electrification program. The peak is currently labeled on maps as "Maja Visens", a likely misspelling borrowed from Ghiglione’s work, as no other pre-war sources mention it in this form.

== Geology ==
Maja e Vishnjës rises within a rugged alpine landscape dominated by limestone formations and steep rocky slopes. The upper layers of the summit feature extensive stone masses and exposed terrain, giving the peak a dramatic and imposing appearance.

== Climbing Route ==
The mountain can be reached by two principal routes. From Thorë Pass, the trail leads toward the Radohina cirques and then ascends via Radohina Pass. Climbers first reach an unnamed peak at 2,474 meters before descending slightly through a rocky massif to begin the final ascent toward Maja e Vishnjës, which appears nearly inaccessible from below. From Theth, the route passes near the Harapi caves toward the saddle and the valley of Vizhna. From there, climbers must backtrack slightly in order to access the ascent route to the summit.

The ascent is considered demanding and requires solid preparation and mountaineering experience. A round-trip hike typically takes around ten hours, covering approximately 15 km, with a total elevation gain of about 1,600 meters.

== See also ==
- List of mountains in Albania
