= Deçan Mountain =

Mountain in Kosovo

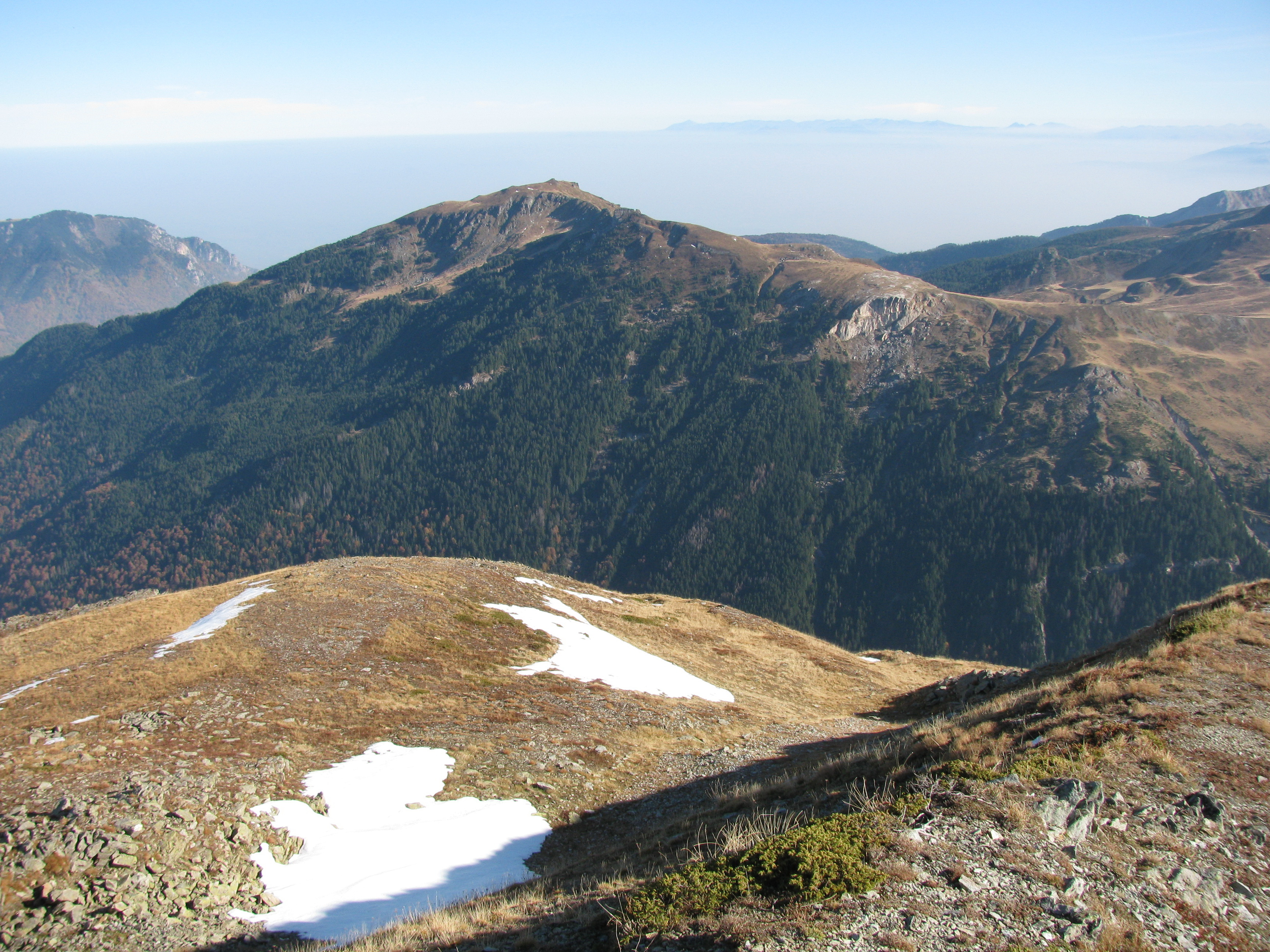
- Deçan mountain from Maja e Ropës

Highest point
- Elevation: 2,200 m (7,200 ft)
- Coordinates: 42.5748°N 20.1089°E

Geography
- Location within Kosovo
- Location: Prizren, Kosovo
- Parent range: Albanian Alps

Deçan Mountain (Albanian: Mali i Deçanit) is a mountain in the west of Kosovo, in the Accursed Mountains range. Its highest point is 2,200 m (7,217 ft 10 in) above sea level. It shares its name with the nearby town of Deçan. Deçan and neighbouring mountain Gjeravica can be seen from as far away as Radoniq lake.
