= Vukoça =

Summit in Albania

- Location within Albania

Highest point
- Elevation: 2,431 m (7,976 ft)
- Prominence: 191 m (627 ft)
- Coordinates: 42°29′06″N 19°46′19″E

Geography
- Country: Albania
- Region: Albanian Alps
- Municipality: Shkodër
- Parent range: Accursed Mountains

Geology
- Rock age(s): Mesozoic, Neogene
- Mountain type: summit
- Rock type(s): limestone, dolomite

Vukoça is a summit in the Accursed Mountains range of northern Albania. Rising at a height of 2,431 m (7,976 ft), it lies about 7 km southwest of the village Vusanje, near the Montenegrin border. Like other peaks in the range, it too has a steep, rocky summit. Climbing it is generally easier in summer, as snow and ice in winter make the route to the summit much more challenging.

== See also ==
- List of mountains in Albania
