= Buni Jezercë =

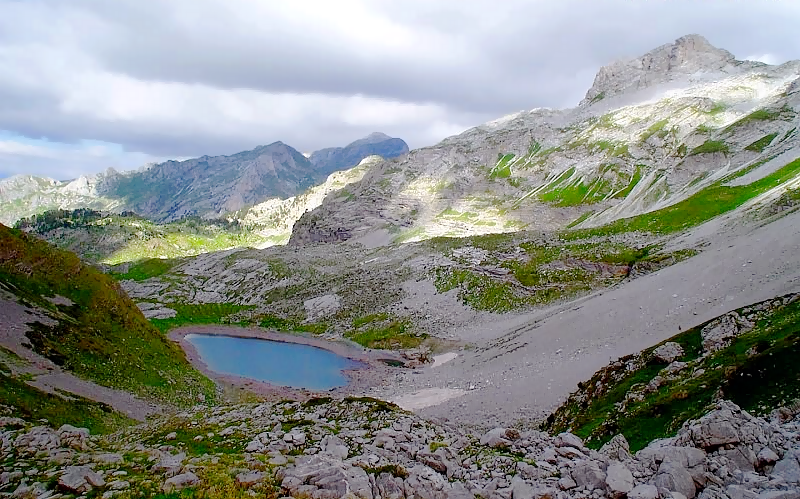
- Liqeni i Madh, the largest lake of Buni Jezercë, Bjeshkët e Namuna range, Albania

- Location within Albania Location within Montenegro Location within Balkans
- Interactive map of Buni Jezercë
- Location: Albanian Alps
- Coordinates: 42°27′38″N 19°48′24″E
- Type: glacial lake
- Basin countries: Albania
- Max. length: 380 m (1,250 ft)
- Max. width: 200 m (660 ft)
- Surface area: 5 ha (12 acres)
- Surface elevation: 1,792 m (5,879 ft)

Buni Jezercë (Albanian: Liqeni i Madh i Buni Jezercës) is one of the largest lakes in the Albanian Alps found in the north of Albania. Big Lake is on an altitude of 1,792 m (5,879 ft) above sea level and is the largest of the 6 lakes found in the Buni Jezercë (meaning 'Valley of the Lakes') near the Montenegrin border. Many high peaks surround the lake, including Maja e Jezercës with a height of 2,694 m (8,839 ft). This large mountain lake has an estimated maximum length of 380 m (1,247 ft) and a maximum width of 200 m (656 ft). The area of the lake is almost five hectares.
