= Maja e Ropës =

Mountain peak in Kosovo

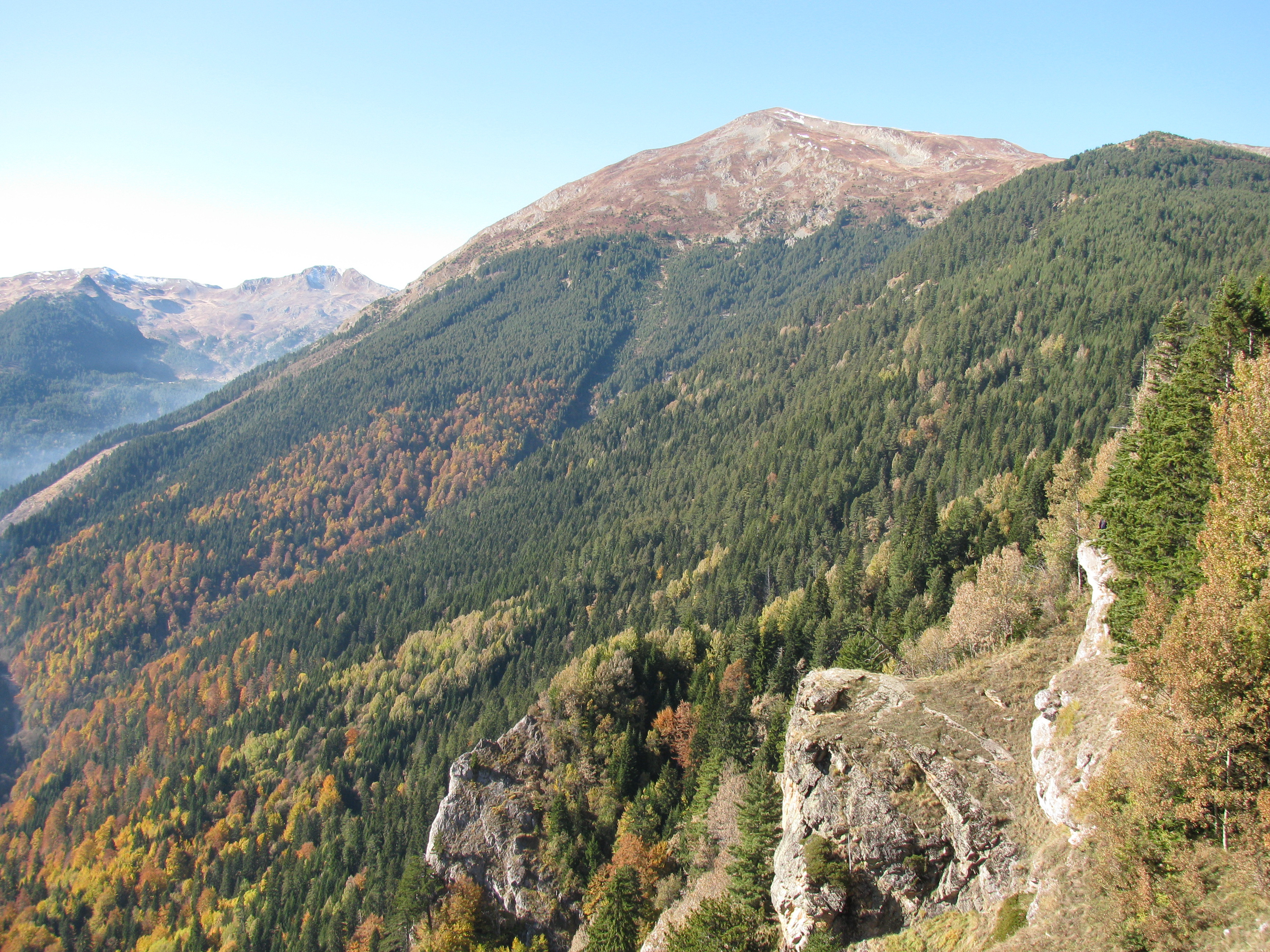
- Maja e Ropës

Highest point
- Elevation: 2,502 m (8,209 ft)
- Coordinates: 42°34′29″N 20°6′32″E

Naming
- Language of name: Albanian

Geography
- Location within Kosovo
- Location: Pejë and Deçan
- Country: Kosovo
- Parent range: Accursed Mountains

Maja e Ropës is a mountain in Kosovo with a height of 2,502 metres (8,209 ft). It is a part of Bogićevica area in the Accursed Mountains. It is the second highest mountain in the Bogićevica area after Marijash at 2,533 metres (8,310 ft).

== See also ==
- List of mountains in Kosovo
- National parks of Kosovo
