= Shniku =

Summit in Albania

- Maja e Madhe
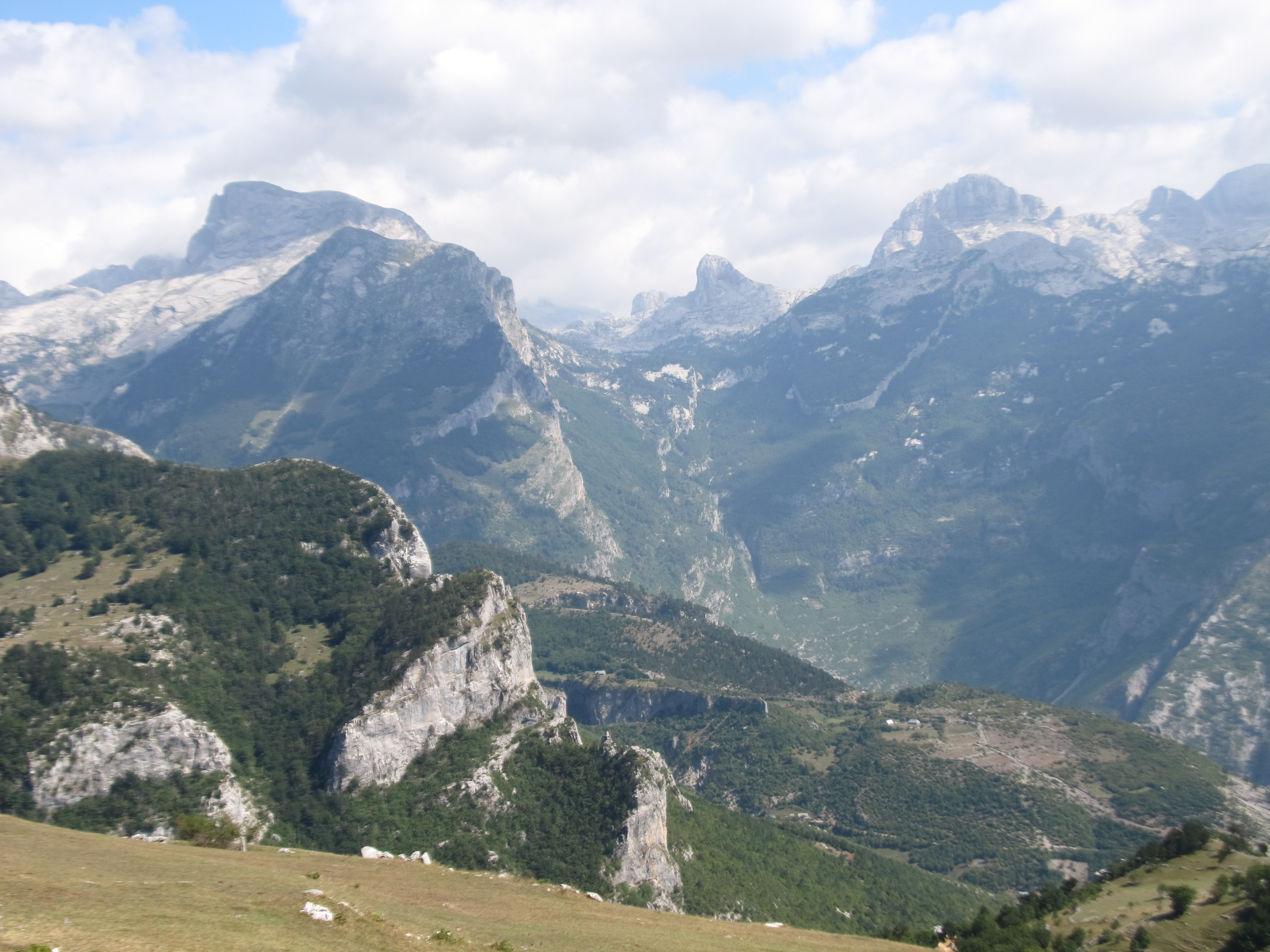
- Front view of Shniku to the left

Highest point
- Elevation: 2,552 m (8,373 ft)
- Prominence: 618 m (2,028 ft)
- Isolation: 17 m (56 ft)
- Coordinates: 42°28′20″N 19°44′13″E

Naming
- Nickname: Maja Skënderbeu

Geography
- Location within Albania
- Country: Albania
- Region: Albanian Alps
- Municipality: Shkodër
- Parent range: Accursed Mountains

Geology
- Rock age(s): Mesozoic, Neogene
- Mountain type: summit
- Rock type(s): limestone, dolomite

Shniku (lit. 'St. Nicholas'), also known as Maja e Madhe or Maja e Shnikut, is a summit in the Accursed Mountains of northern Albania. Rising to 2,552 m (8,373 ft) above sea level, it is one of the prominent peaks of the Albanian Alps and forms part of a massive limestone structure in the interior section of the range.

== Geology ==
Shniku is situated east of the village of Nikç in the municipality of Kelmend, near the karst depression known as Ujkcarë–Koprisht. From its summit, the peak offers wide panoramic views in all directions, overlooking several valleys and mountain basins, including Nikç, Lepushë, Koprisht and Vizhne.

Composed primarily of Mesozoic limestone with minor dolomite formations, the summit belongs to one of the highest tectonic units of the Albanian Alps. Its elevation and rugged relief are the result of Neogene uplift followed by prolonged erosion and structural dissection.

The western slopes are particularly steep and affected by large-scale gravitational rock movements, while the eastern slopes descend more gradually.

== Climbing route ==
The ascent to Maja e Shnikut can be approached by two principal routes. One trail passes through the caves of Harapit and continues toward Vizhne valley before connecting with the path that descends toward Nikç. The second route proceeds by the mountain pass near the glacial lake of Pejë, where the marked trail branches in the direction of Nikç. These two mountain paths converge at the area known locally as "Kodra e Kuajve", from where the climb continues along the ridge and finally reaches the summit without a defined trail.

Because of its long distance and steep elevation gain, the climb is considered demanding. A full round trip usually takes about eleven hours, covering roughly 24 km with nearly 1,700 meters of elevation difference.

== See also ==
- List of mountains in Albania
