= Biga e Shalës =

Mountain peak in Albania

- Location within Albania

Highest point
- Elevation: 2,230 m (7,320 ft)
- Coordinates: 42°19′52″N 19°43′26″E

Naming
- Language of name: Albanian

Geography
- Location: Shalë, Shkodër, Albania
- Parent range: Albanian Alps

Biga e Shalës is a mountain peak in the Albanian Alps in Albania. Biga e Shalës has an altitude of 2,230 m (7,320 ft).

== Etymology ==
The etymology of the Biga e Shalës peak is Albanian. The name of the peak consists of two Albanian words: "Bigë" (Albanian definite form: biga), meaning "rocky peak" and "Shalës", the genitive (possessive) form of Shala. Shala is the name of a historical northern Albanian tribe (fis) and the mountainous region they inhabit. The Shala tribe is one of the major tribes of the Malësia e Madhe region.

== See also ==
- List of mountains in Albania
- Protected areas of Albania
