= Lice Mountain =

Mountain in Kosovo

Lice is a mountain in the Accursed Mountains in western Kosovo. Lice reaches a height of 1,799 m above sea level. The mountain borders the Rugova Canyon in the south and the village of Kuqishtë and the river Lumbardhi i Pejës in the east.
