= Grebeni =

Summit in Albania

- Maja e Grebenit
- Location within Albania

Highest point
- Elevation: 1,840 m (6,040 ft)
- Prominence: 178 m (584 ft)
- Isolation: 3.6 km (2.2 mi)
- Coordinates: 42°33′26″N 19°41′42″E

Geography
- Country: Albania
- Region: Albanian Alps
- Municipality: Malësia e Madhe
- Parent range: Accursed Mountains

Geology
- Rock age: Pleistocene
- Mountain type: summit
- Rock type: flysch

Grebeni is a summit in the Accursed Mountains of northern Albania, rising to an elevation of 1,840 m (6,040 ft). It forms part of a structurally distinct alpine ridge located between the valleys of Cemi i Selcës and Vermosh, within the broader mountain system of the northern Albanian highlands.

== Geography ==
Grebeni occupies the eastern continuation of a mountain ridge that arches between the valleys of Vermosh and Lepushë. East of the peak, the ridge branches into two directions: one extending toward Maja e Pjeshkës (1,820 m) and the other descending to Qafa e Bordolecit (1,320 m). Within this eastern sector, Grebeni constitutes the highest and most prominent point.

Its slopes descend gradually toward the Vermosh Valley, creating a transitional geomorphological zone between high alpine terrain and lower valley landscapes.

== Geology ==
The summit is developed almost entirely within a flysch-dominated terrain. It occupies a synclinal structure bounded by compressional tectonic faults. Erosion of the flysch formations has produced smooth slopes and a generally subdued relief. Local karst features, including dolines and sinkholes, occur near the summit.

The surrounding area contains several small glacial cirques situated above 1,500 meters, representing remnants of Pleistocene glaciation.

The mountain contributes to the headwaters of tributaries within the Vermosh River drainage system. Its slopes are dissected by a relatively dense network of short mountain streams, particularly on the northern and northeastern flanks, where cirque basins concentrate seasonal runoff.

== Biodiversity ==
Lower and middle elevations are predominantly covered by dense beech (Fagus sylvatica) and fir forests, characteristic of the northern Albanian Alps. Together they form part of the extensive woodland complexes of Vermosh, Lepushë and Skrobotushë, which are among the most ecologically significant forested areas in the region.

Above 1,800 meters, vegetation transitions into limited patches of alpine grassland, composed of sparse plant communities adapted to colder temperatures and increased wind exposure.

== See also ==
- List of mountains in Albania
