= Brevina =

Mountain peak in Albania and Kosovo

- Location within Albania

Highest point
- Elevation: 2,259 m (7,411 ft)
- Coordinates: 42°29′58″N 20°09′56″E

Naming
- Language of name: Albanian

Geography
- Location: Albania and Kosovo
- Parent range: Albanian Alps

Brevina is a summit in the Albanian Alps in Albania and Kosovo. Maja e Brevinës has an altitude of 2,259 m (7,411 ft).

== See also ==
- List of mountains in Albania
- List of mountains in Kosovo
- Protected areas of Albania
