= Mount Trojan =

Mountain on the border between Albania and Montenegro

Trojan
- Mali i Trojanit
- Location within Albania

Highest point
- Elevation: 2,194 m (7,198 ft)
- Prominence: 346 m (1,135 ft)
- Isolation: 6.1 km (3.8 mi)
- Coordinates: 42°33′04″N 19°44′59″E

Geography
- Countries: Albania; Montenegro
- Region: Albanian Alps
- Municipality: Malësi e Madhe, Gusinje
- Parent range: Malësia e Vermoshit

Geology
- Mountain type: massif
- Rock type(s): effusives-carbonates, flysch

Trojan (def. 'Trojani') is a prominent massif in the Accursed Mountains, located near the state border with Montenegro. It stretches between the Jezercë block in the south and the Marlula ridge in the north.

== Geology ==
The massif's position at the forefront of the tectonic overpass, along with its diverse lithological composition of carbonates and effusive sheets, has resulted in distinctive morphological characteristics. At the heart of the massif is Maja e Trojanit, standing tall at 2,194 m (7,198 ft), with its effusive-carbonate core, gradually descending along the flysch edges towards the Dobku Pass in the south and Gadusë in the north. Maja e Perondisë 2,059 m (6,755 ft) rises from the southern limit, displaying a gentle shape due to its silty composition.

On the Albanian side, the western slope of the massif features two noticeable breaks, one between carbonates and effusives, and the other between effusives and flysch, with cirques found above the elevation of 1,600–1,700 m (5,200–5,600 ft), marking the emergence of the right branches of the Lepushë stream.

== Biodiversity ==
The forest cover is predominantly dense with oak trees. Well-known forests in the area include Skrobotushë, Budaç, Lepushë and Morin. Small stretches of alpine pastures are spread between Maja e Vilës and Greben, at heights exceeding 1,800 m (5,900 ft).

== See also ==
- List of mountains in Albania
- List of mountains in Montenegro
