= Shtogu =

Summit in Albania

- Location within Albania

Highest point
- Elevation: 2,246 m (7,369 ft)
- Coordinates: 42°27′07″N 19°44′15″E

Geography
- Location: Albania

Shtogu, also known as Maja e Kllogjnit, is a summit in the Accursed Mountains range in Albania in the south of the Dinaric Alps, about 4.5 km southeast of the village Nikç. Maja Stogut is known in the area for its high limestone pillar which rises to 2,246m above mean sea level.
