= Radohina =

Mountain in Albania

- Maja "Shkurte Pal Vata"
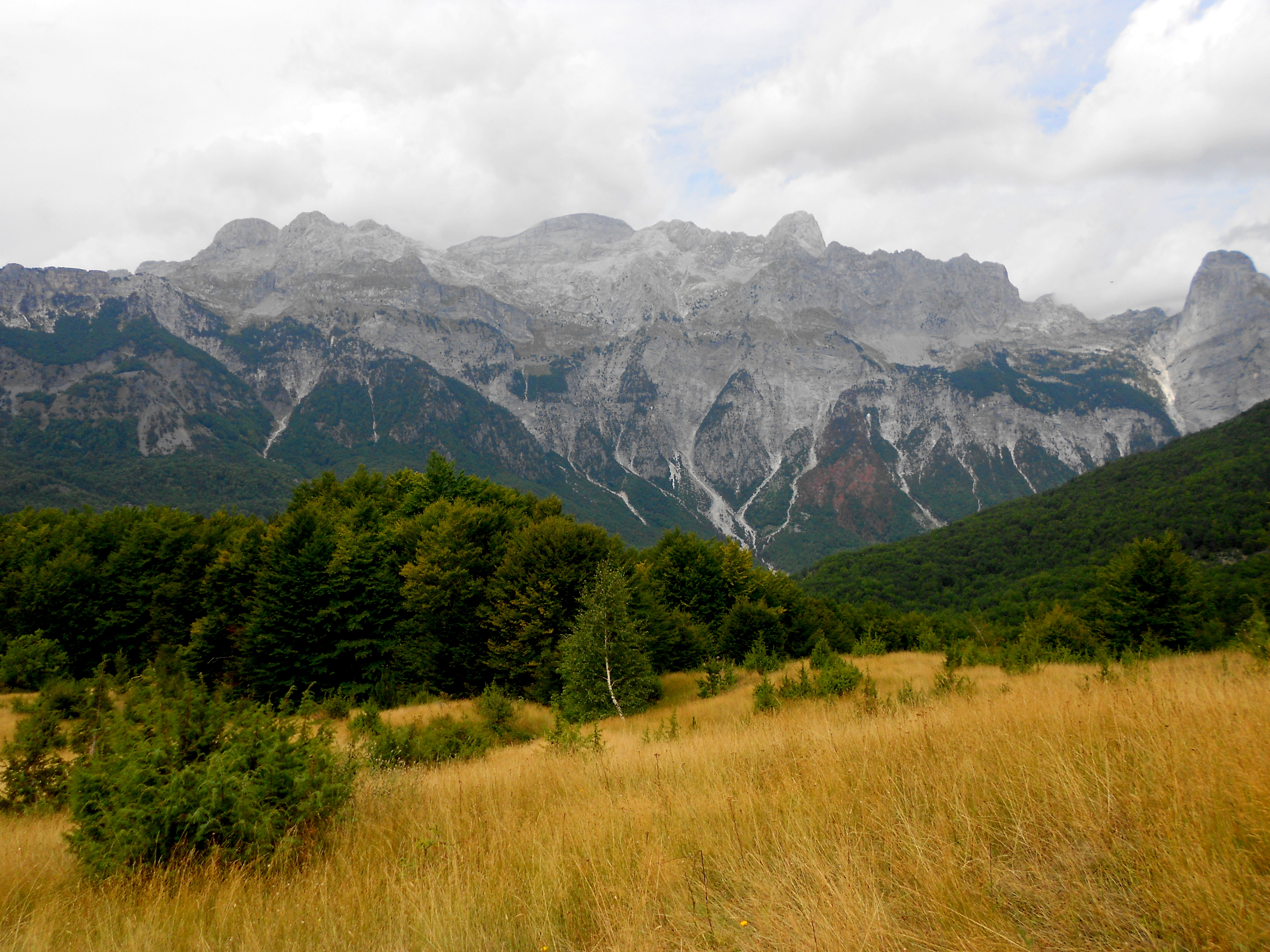
- View of Radohina from Theth

Highest point
- Elevation: 2,568 m (8,425 ft)
- Prominence: 856 m (2,808 ft)
- Isolation: 6.2 km (3.9 mi)
- Coordinates: 42°25′37″N 19°43′32″E

Geography
- Location within Albania
- Country: Albania
- Region: Albanian Alps
- Municipality: Shkodër
- Parent range: Accursed Mountains

Geology
- Rock age: Mesozoic
- Mountain type: massif
- Rock type(s): limestone, dolomite

Radohina is a massif situated in the Albanian Alps, within the boundaries of Shkodër municipality. Its main peak, Maja e Radohinës, reaches a height of 2,568 m (8,425 ft).

== Geology ==
Radohina lies between the valleys of Theth in the southeast and Cemi i Vuklit in the northwest. A dome-shaped mountain mass composed entirely of Mesozoic limestone and dolomite, it features steep slopes that drop into the Bogë meadow and Theth pits, with the glacial cirques of Kllogjen and Radohina pits surrounding it in the northeast and southwest.

Two other peaks rise on both sides of the mountain, Maja e Vishnjës 2,517 m (8,258 ft) to the northeast and Maja e Thatë 2,541 m (8,337 ft) to the southwest. Like many other massifs in the Albanian Alps, Radohina is mostly devoid of vegetation.

== Climbing route ==
The summit can be reached from Thorë Pass by following the shepherds’ trail that enters the hollows of Radohina. After passing Maja e Vukalit, a path branches off to the left and leads directly toward the peak. This route is more demanding than the alternative trail, which continues to the end of the hollows as far as the saddle of Radohina, from where the summit can be reached in about 30 minutes.

The full loop hike takes approximately seven hours to complete, covering a distance of 17 kilometers with 900 meters of elevation gain.

== See also ==
- List of mountains in Albania
