= Rrasa e Zogut =

Mountain peak in Kosovo

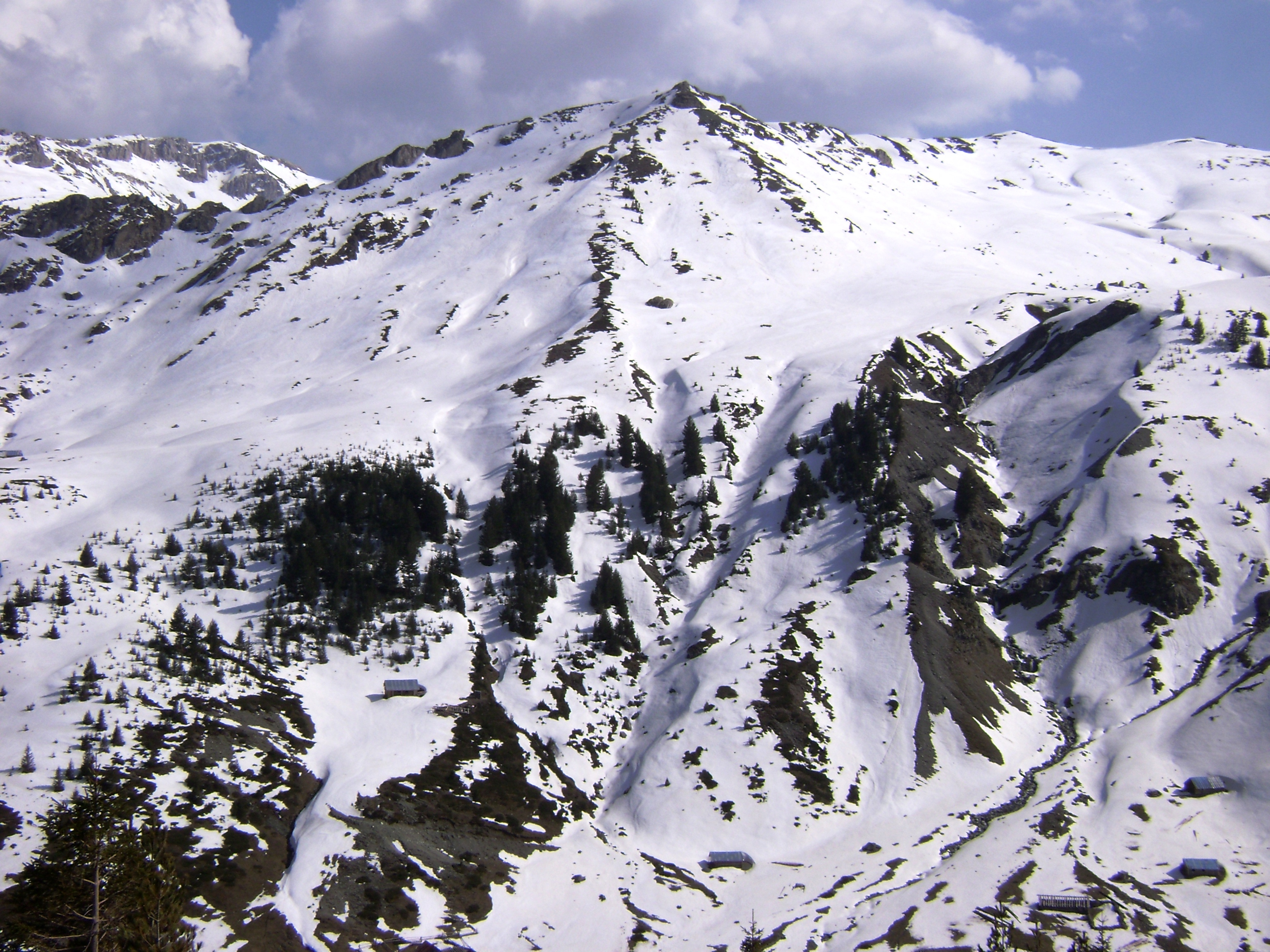

Highest point
- Elevation: 2,309 m (7,575 ft)
- Coordinates: 42.5022°N 20.1788°E

Geography
- Location within Kosovo
- Location: Junik
- Country: Kosovo
- Parent range: Accursed Mountains

Rrasa e Zogut is a mountain peak in Junik in Kosovo, 1 kilometre (0.6 mi) from the border with Albania. It is part of the Accursed Mountains and it is 2,309 m (7,575 ft) high and located 3.5 kilometres (2.2 mi) south-east of Gjeravica (2,658 m or 8,720 ft), the highest mountain in Kosovo.
