= Veleçik =

Mountain in Albania

- Mali i Veleçikut
- Location within Albania

Highest point
- Elevation: 1,727 m (5,666 ft)
- Prominence: 266 m (873 ft)
- Isolation: 5.2 km (3.2 mi)
- Coordinates: 42°21′49″N 19°31′52″E

Geography
- Country: Albania
- Region: Albanian Alps
- Municipality: Malësi e Madhe
- Parent range: Accursed Mountains

Geology
- Rock age: Mesozoic
- Mountain type: mountain
- Rock type(s): limestone, dolomite

Veleçik (def. 'Veleçiku') is a mountain located in the Albanian Alps, within the boundaries of Malësia e Madhe municipality, reaching a height of 1,727 m (5,666 ft).

== Geology ==
Composed entirely of Mesozoic limestone and dolomite, the mountain features a conical shape with steep slopes and is connected to Maja e Sprehtë 1,717 m (5,633 ft) from the east. The southern slope is mostly devoid of vegetation, while the northern slope is covered by dense beech forests.

Settled on the southeastern foothills of the mountain is the village of Razmë, an important tourist attraction, hosting the country's oldest and largest mountain holiday retreats.

== See also ==
- List of mountains in Albania
