= Maja e Dromodolit =

Mountain in Kosovo

Coordinates: 42°46′33″N 20°05′27″E

Maja e Dromodolit (Eng: Dromodol Peak) is a mountain peak in the Pejë district in the Rugova region of Kosovo, bordering Montenegro. The area is popular amongst mountain climbers and wanderers. The mountain is 2119 meters above the sea. The area is popular amongst tourists. From the village of Koshutan, it is 14 kilometers to mountain.
