= Tromedja =

Tromedja, Tromeđa or Tromegja (Serbian: Тромеђа, Macedonian: Тромеѓа, meaning "tripoint") may refer to:

- Tromedja (mountain), mountain ion the tripoint of Albania, Kosovo and Montenegro;
- Tromegja, a village in North Macedonia.
