= Bogićevica =

Coordinates: 42.6°N 20.08°E

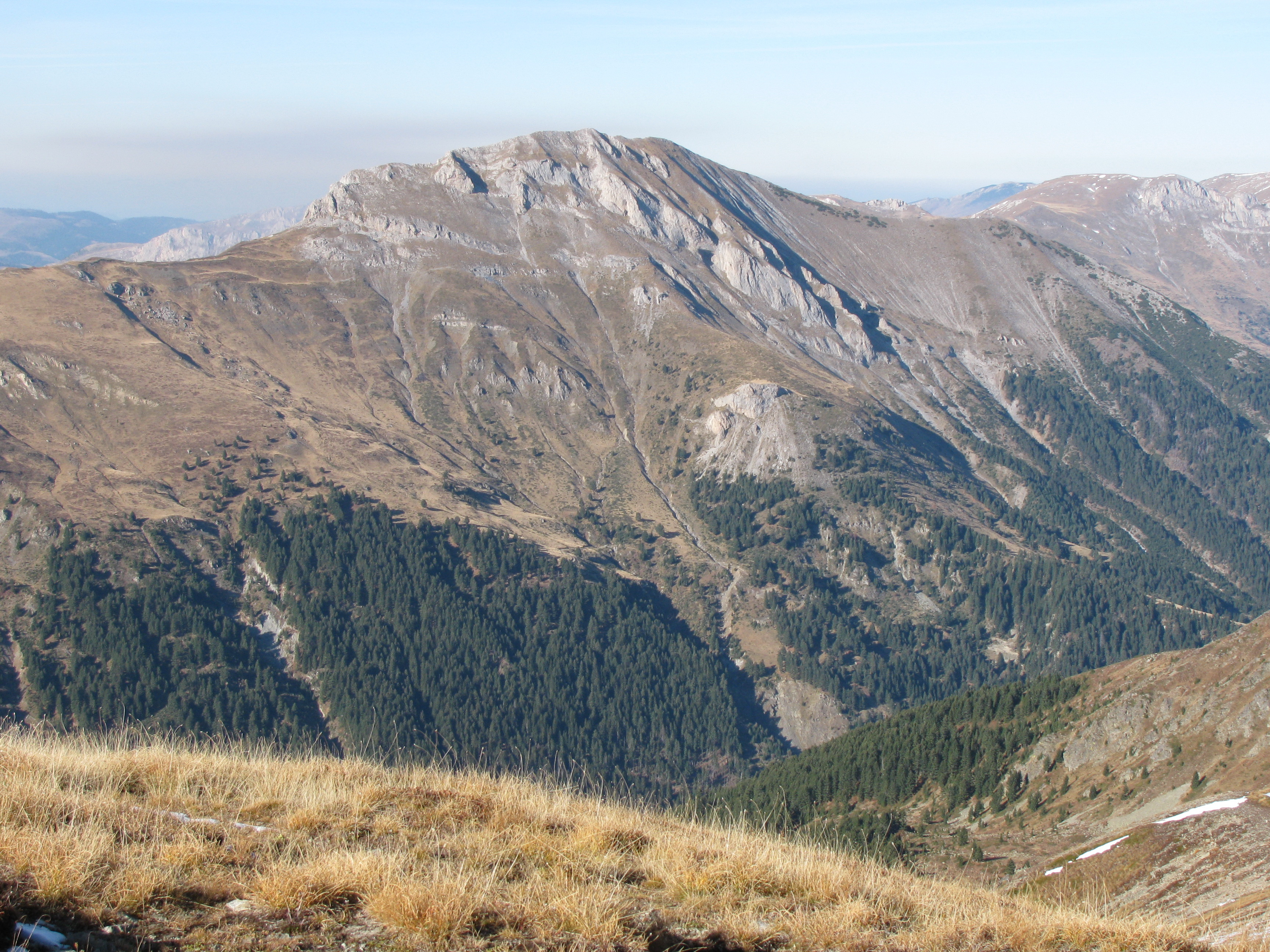
Marijash as seen from Rops

Bogićevica (Serbian Cyrillic: Богићевица; Albanian: Bogiçevica / Bogiqevica) is a mountain area in the Accursed Mountains (Prokletije) mountain range. It spreads over Montenegro, Kosovo and Albania. It is about 15 km long and 10 km wide. The mountain area has a number of peaks higher than 2000 m and two higher than 2500 m. Marijash (2533 m) and Maja e Ropës (2502 m) are both located in Kosovo. The towns of Deçan in Kosovo and Tropojë in Albania are located near the area.

== Geography, topography, and geology ==
Bogićevica is located in the eastern part of the Prokletije (Accursed Mountains) system. It occupies a nodal geographic position on the main watershed of the Balkan Peninsula, situated between the Lim River valley to the west and the Metohija basin to the east.

The main ridge has a sub-meridional direction extending from Čakor Pass in the north to Trekufiri (Trigranichni) Peak (2356 m) in the south, which serves as a point where the three countries (Montenegro, Kosovo, and Albania) meet. From this peak, the main ridge of the mountain system continues southwest, connecting with the central part of the Prokletije massif, along which runs the state border between Montenegro and Albania. To the southeast, another ridge separates, along which runs the Kosovo-Albanian border.

Bogićevica has a complex orographic configuration, with the main ridges having elevations between 1900 and 2100 m. Besides the nodal Tromeđa peak, the highest peaks of the mountain lie on lateral ridges: Bogdaš (Marijash, 2533 m) and Maja Rops (2502 m) in Kosovo, Krš Bogićevice (2374 m) and Hridski krš (2358 m) in Montenegro.

The geological structure of Bogićevica is complex and diverse. Unlike the central and western parts of the Prokletije mountain system, which belong to the classic limestone Dinarides, Bogićevica and its neighbouring mountains (Junik Mountains and Gjeravica) are built primarily (though not entirely) of silicate rocks.

The Montenegrin part is mainly composed of Paleozoic schists, which are thin-layered and friable, with layers dipping to the north-northeast. Among these schists, there are isolated patches of well-cemented quartz conglomerates (Perm-Triassic). In the eastern (Kosovo) part, a granite body runs parallel to the main ridge, crossing the border with Albania and continuing southeast. At the contact between granite and schists, narrow strips of marble are exposed.

In the easternmost periphery, at the border with the Metohija field, there are extensive massifs of Mesozoic and Paleogene limestones, while the southeastern branches (including Đeravica peak) consist of basic rocks – gabbro, metagabbro, and serpentinites.

== Glaciation history ==
During the Pleistocene, Bogićevica was glaciated in its highest parts. From this glaciation, which is believed to have occurred in several phases, erosional forms (cirques, trough valleys) and accumulation forms (moraines) remain. Currently, there are no permanent snow fields or glaciers in this part of Prokletije.

During the maximum glacial phase, which likely predates the Last Glacial Maximum, the snowline was around 1850 m. In the valley of Babinopolska River (a tributary of the Lim), which occupies a central position in the mountain, the glacier deposited a distinct moraine at 1650 m. The morphological character of the valley, however, maintains its trough-like appearance down to Babino Polje (at 1500 m), after which it abruptly narrows.

Despite substantial height and northern exposure, cirques at the headwaters of Babinopolska and adjacent rivers are either not formed or are very shallow. This is because the glaciers flowed along the layers with considerable speed and minimal thickness, preventing significant incision. The Dobërdol cirque in the Albanian part is significantly deeper and more pronounced, where the incision occurred across the layers. From detailed geomorphological mapping, researchers have identified that the main Bogićevica glacier reached a maximum length of 6 km and covered an area of approximately 6.9 km^{2}. This glacier deposited a 20 m high end moraine at an altitude of 1560 m. The Dober Dol glacier, which started from the great Dober Dol cirque (4.5 km_{2} in area) in the southern part of Bogićevica, continued through the valley Llumi i Gashit, though no end moraine has been detected.

Studies have identified three distinct glacial phases in the Prokletije region, each with specific equilibrium line altitude (ELA) values. The ELA represents the boundary on a glacier where accumulation of snow equals ablation (melting), essentially marking the snow line during glaciation periods and providing information about past climate conditions. For Bogićevica specifically, these values were: 1880 m during the first glaciation (likely Early or Middle Würmian), 2085 m during the second glaciation (probably Last Glacial Maximum), and 2175 m during the third glaciation (possibly Younger Dryas). The ELAs on Mt. Bogićevica were roughly 200 m higher than those in the western parts of Prokletije near Jezercë. This difference is attributed to lower precipitation, as Bogićevica is situated 20 km to the east from the direction of wet air masses from the Adriatic Sea.

The Bogićevica cirque, oriented northwards, is characterized by intensive gelifluction. While no traces of moraines are recognizable in the main cirque field, three tributary cirques have preserved recessional moraines in the zone between 1950 and 2000 m. These consist of large quartz conglomerate blocks with average dimensions of 9 m^{3}.

== Climate ==
The contemporary climate of the region can be described as transitional between continental and Mediterranean, similar to that of Pirin Mountain in Bulgaria. Annual temperatures for the standard period vary from about 6–7 °C in the Lim valley to around 0 °C at 2500 m altitude. Precipitation decreases dramatically from over 3000 mm/year in the southwestern (Albanian) part of Prokletije to 1020 mm at Andrijevica in the Lim valley. For Bogićevica, annual precipitation totals of 1300–1500 mm/year can be assumed, with a main maximum in November-December and a secondary one in May-June.

== Hydrology ==
Bogićevica lies between the watersheds of the Lim River (to the west) and the Drin River (to the east and south). Due to the predominant silicate rock composition, the mountain range has a developed dense river network. Several mountain lakes have formed, most of which are in cirques in Albanian territory. The most significant on Montenegrin territory is Hridsko Lake.

== Hridsko Lake ==
Hridsko Lake is the most famous lake in Bogićevica mountain and generally in the eastern limits of Montenegro. The lake has a maximum length of 295 m and a width of 175 m. The greatest depth of 5.1 m is found in the northeastern part (about 40 m from the shore). Depending on the water level, which fluctuates by up to 1.5 m, the area varies between 3.37 and 3.60 ha, and the average depth is 1.9 m. The volume of lake water is about 62,000 m^{3}. The shoreline has an irregular shape with a length (depending on the level) between 920 and 1100 m. The bottom near the shores is covered with large blocks. Several rocks protrude in the southern end where the depth is shallow. The lake is fed by precipitation and subsurface flow from the cirque. It drains entirely underground, except in cases of extremely high levels, when a temporary surface outflow appears in the northern end. The lake waters emerge as a spring 200 m northeast of the lake, giving rise to the Hridska River.

Research suggests that Hridsko Lake, situated at 1980 m altitude and occupying an area of about 3.5 ha, was not formed as a typical cirque lake as previously thought. Studies starting in 2013 proposed a new hypothesis that the lake lies inside a large relict rock glacier, formed in the period after the termination of glaciers. This means that the lake depression has a periglacial origin rather than a classic glacial one. This "rock glacier hypothesis" for lake formation represents a rare formation mechanism for lakes on the Balkan Peninsula. The new bathymetry mapping of the lake conducted in 2017 provides support to this hypothesis, showing that the lake bottom features reflect the ridges of a rock glacier beneath, rather than a typical glacially-scoured basin.
