= Maja e Harapit =

Summit in Albania

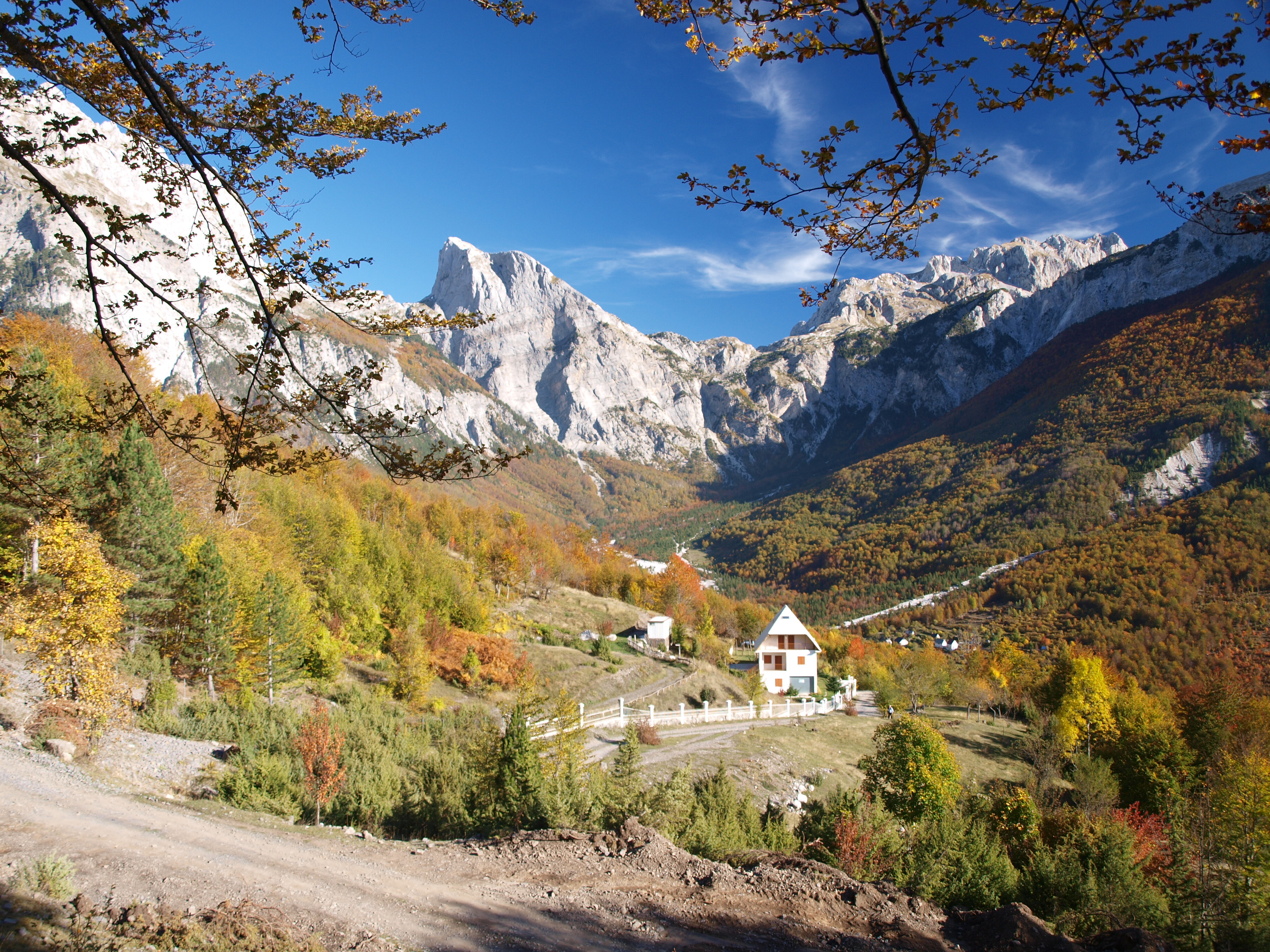
- View of Maja e Harapit in Theth

Highest point
- Elevation: 2,218 m (7,277 ft)
- Prominence: 297 m (974 ft)
- Isolation: 1.1 km (0.68 mi)
- Coordinates: 42°26′43″N 19°45′19″E

Geography
- Location within Albania
- Country: Albania
- Region: Albanian Alps
- Municipality: Shkodër
- Parent range: Accursed Mountains

Geology
- Mountain type: peak
- Rock type: limestone

Maja e Harapit is a summit in the Accursed Mountains range of northern Albania. Situated in close proximity to Qafa e Pejës, it reaches a height of 2,218 m (7,277 ft), forming a prominent landmark in Theth Valley.

== Geology ==
Dominating the northwestern edge of a large basin, its south wall rises steeply to 2,000 m (6,600 ft) and stretches 800 m (2,600 ft), forming a broad saddle that connects the two ranges. The summit and the surrounding saddle feature rugged rocks, pits, and caves, which penetrate the karst formations. Deep beneath the south wall, an extensive horizontal cave, explored by researchers, spans an impressive length of 2,585 m (8,481 ft) and reaches a depth of 346 m (1,135 ft). Inside this cave, fifteen animal species have been discovered.

== See also ==
- List of mountains in Albania
