= Marijash =

Mountain peak in Kosovo

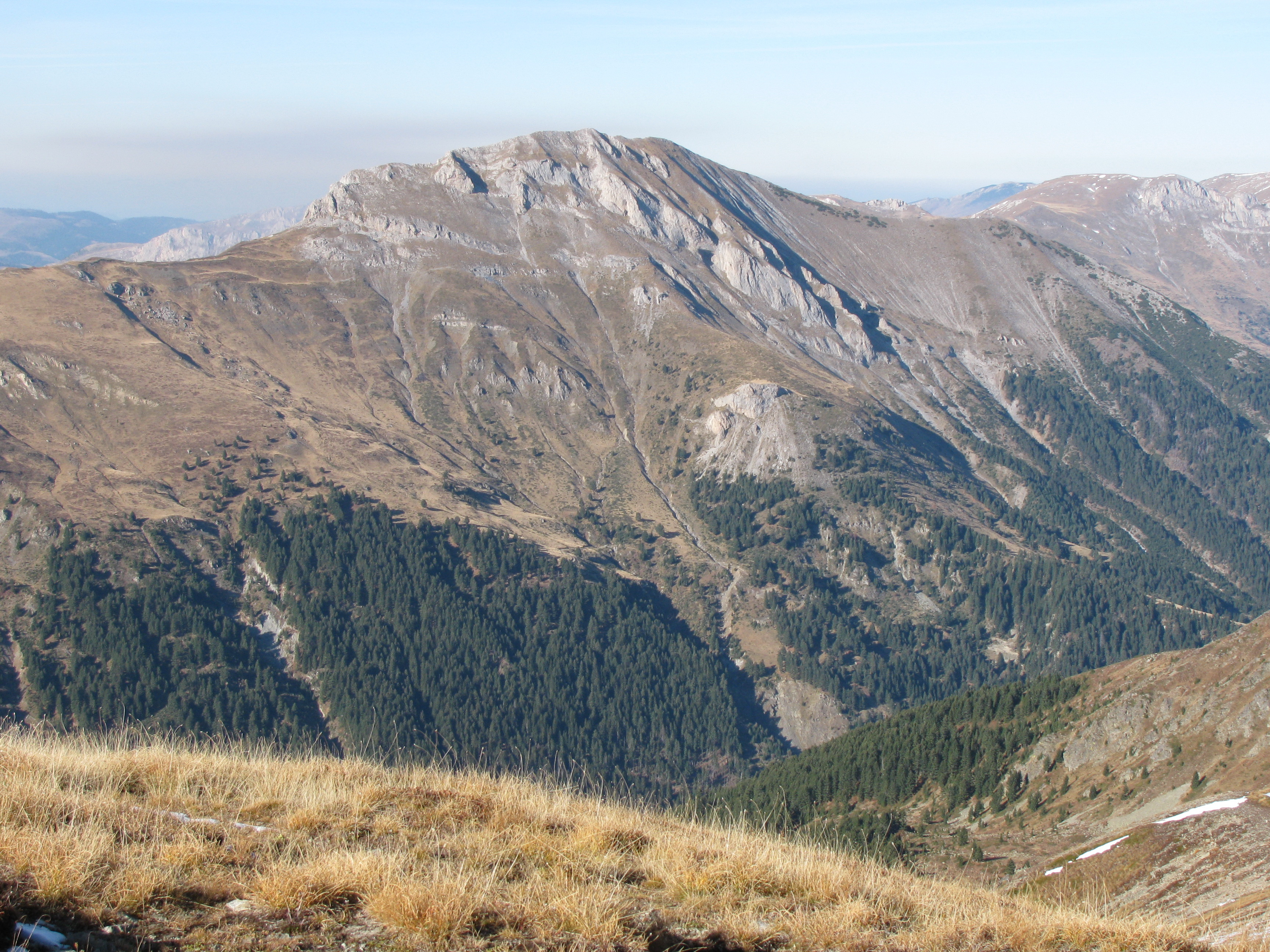
- The mountain seen from Maja e Ropës

Highest point
- Elevation: 2,533 m (8,310 ft)
- Coordinates: 42°36′51″N 20°06′06″E

Geography
- Location within Kosovo
- Location: Deçan, Kosovo
- Parent range: Albanian Alps

Marijash (Albanian: Marijash; Serbian: Маријаш, Marijaš) or Bogdaš (Богдаш) is a mountain in Kosovo in the Accursed Mountains. At 2,533 m (8,310 ft) high, it is the highest peak of the Bogićevica area and one of the highest peaks in the Accursed Mountains in Kosovo. The mountain is located near the Montenegrin border.
