= List of mountains of the Balkans =

== Top 20 highest ultra prominent mountains in mainland Balkans ==
This is a list of the 19 ultra prominent mountains in mainland Balkan Peninsula.

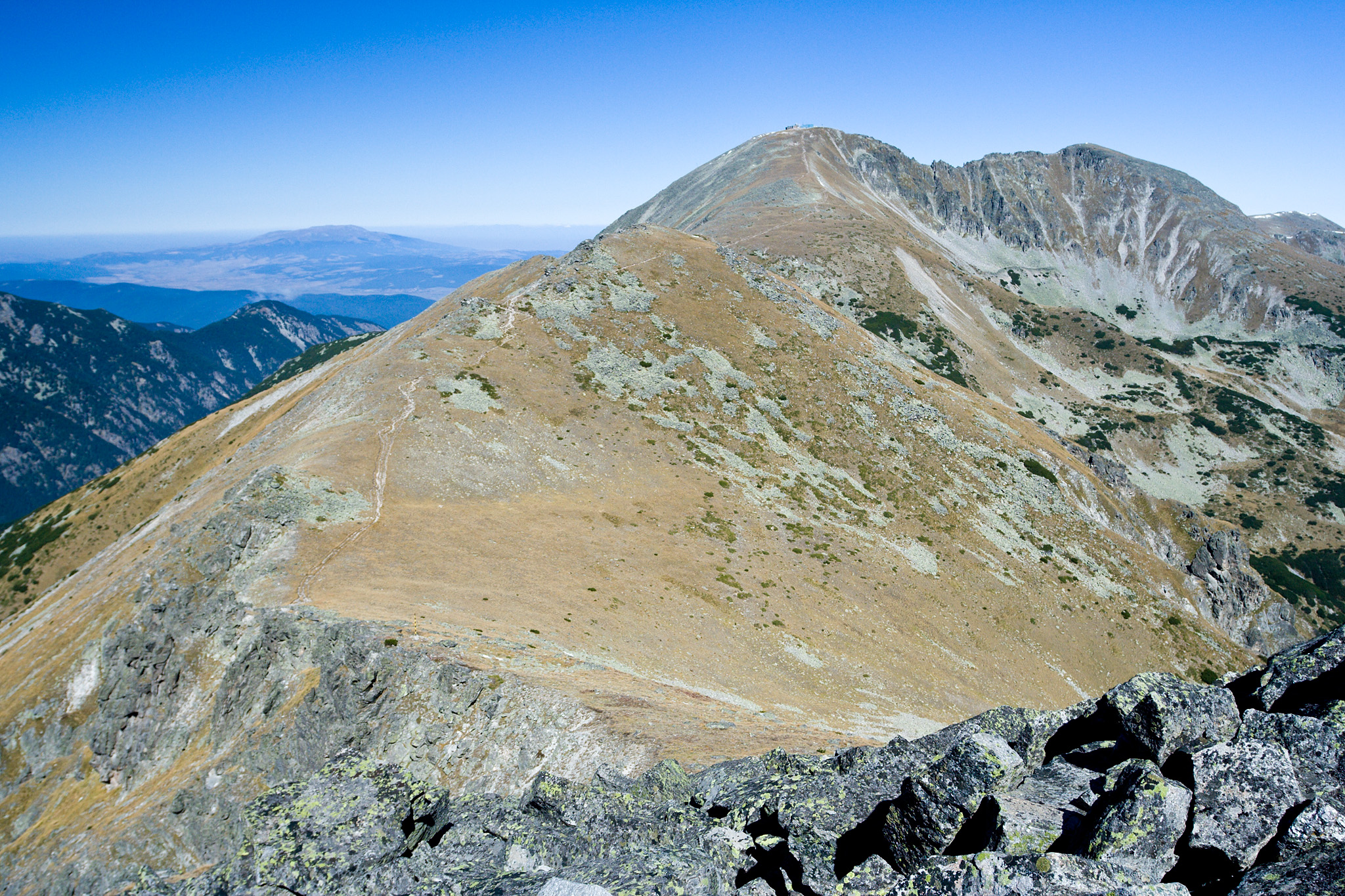
Musala Peak, Rila Mountain, Bulgaria

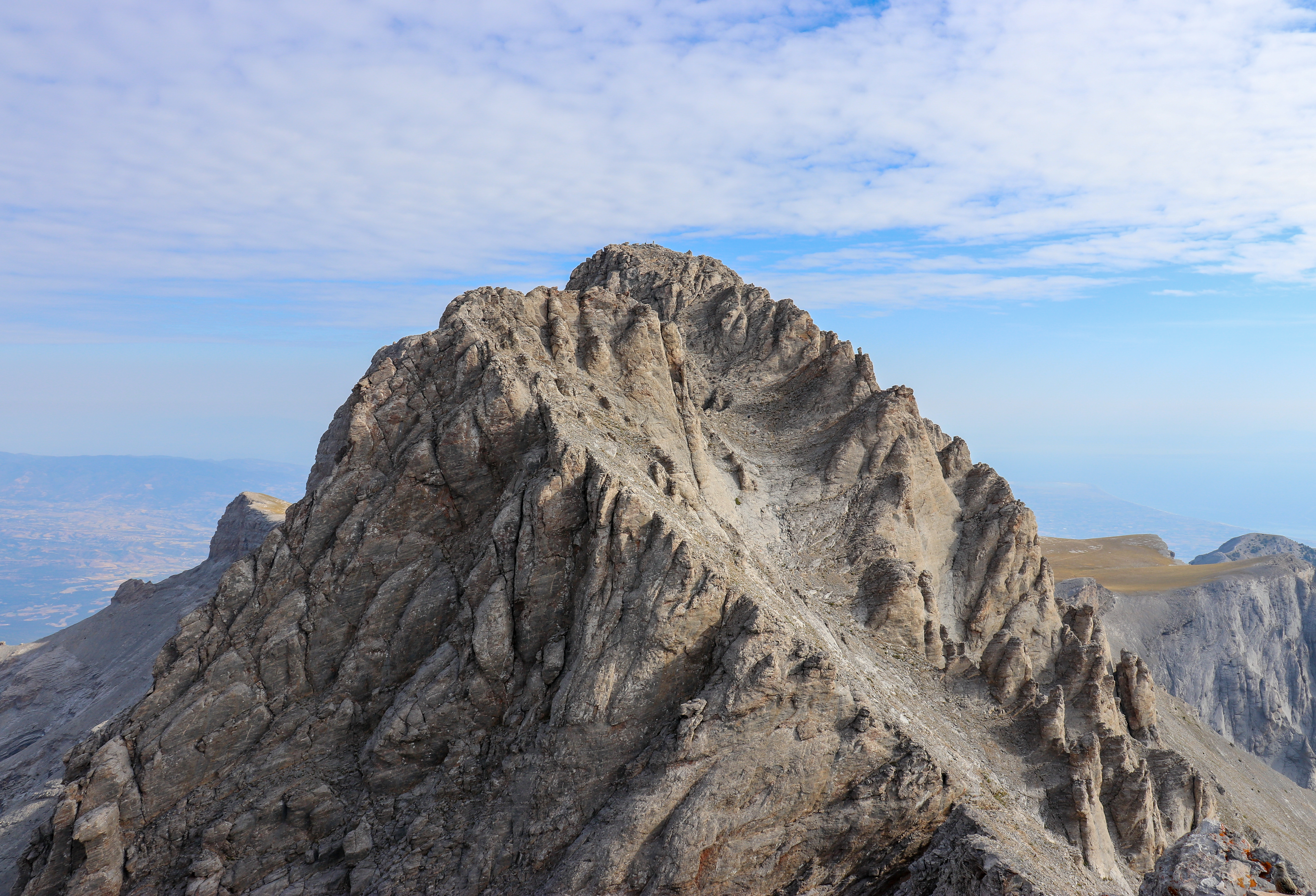
Mytikas Peak, Mount Olympus, Greece

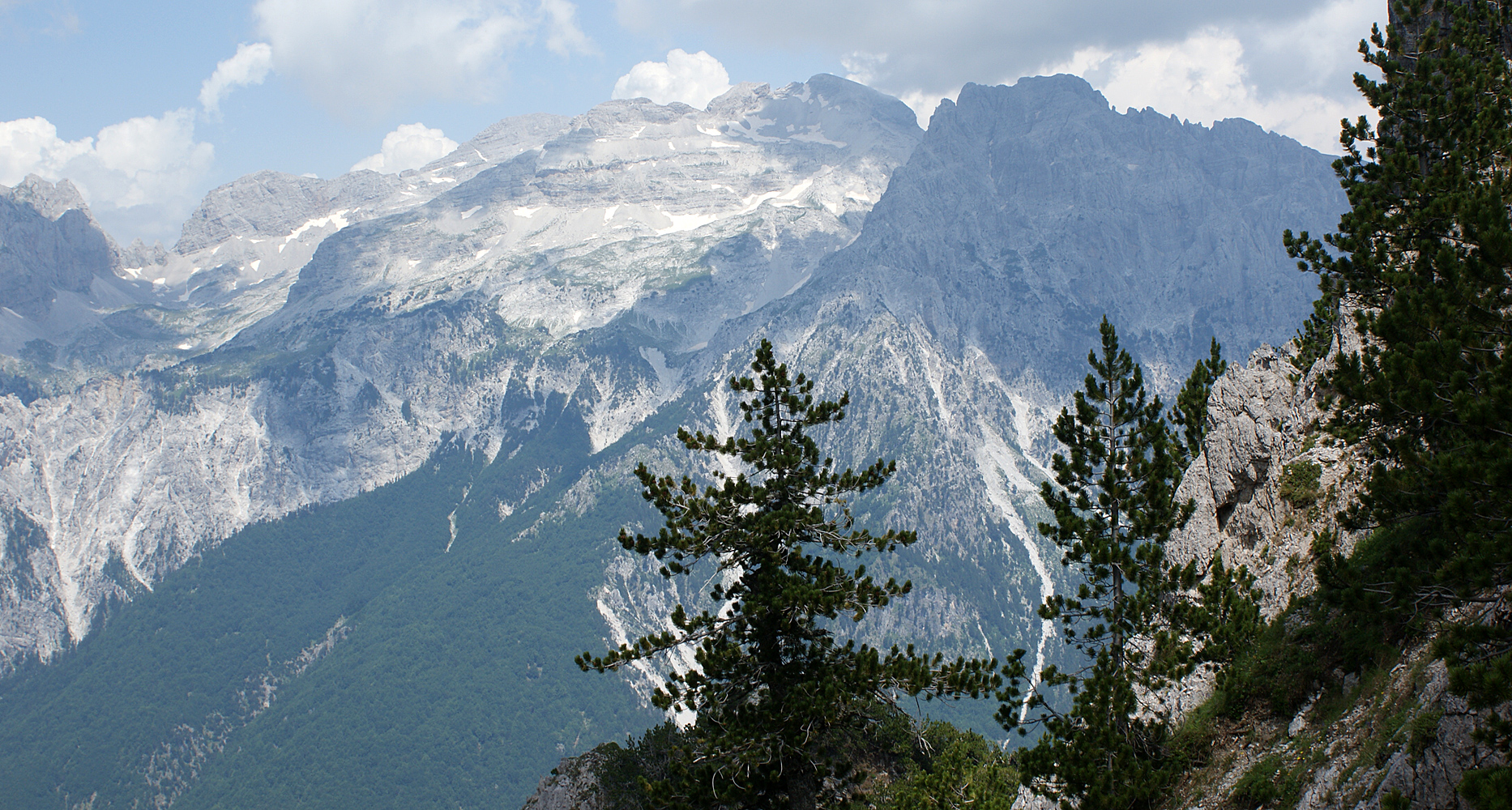
Maja e Jezercës, Accursed Mountains, Albania

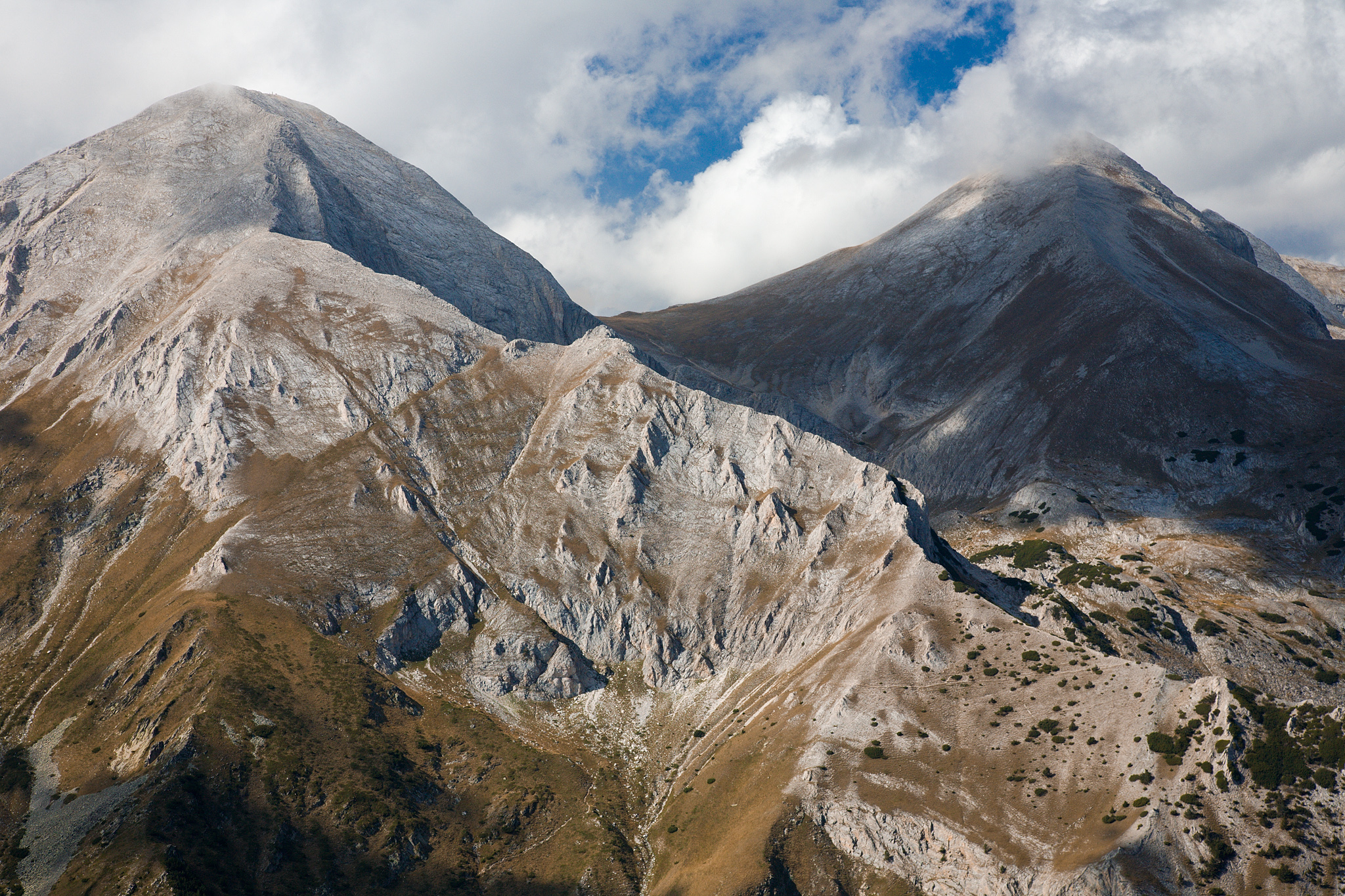
Vihren, Pirin Mountain, Bulgaria

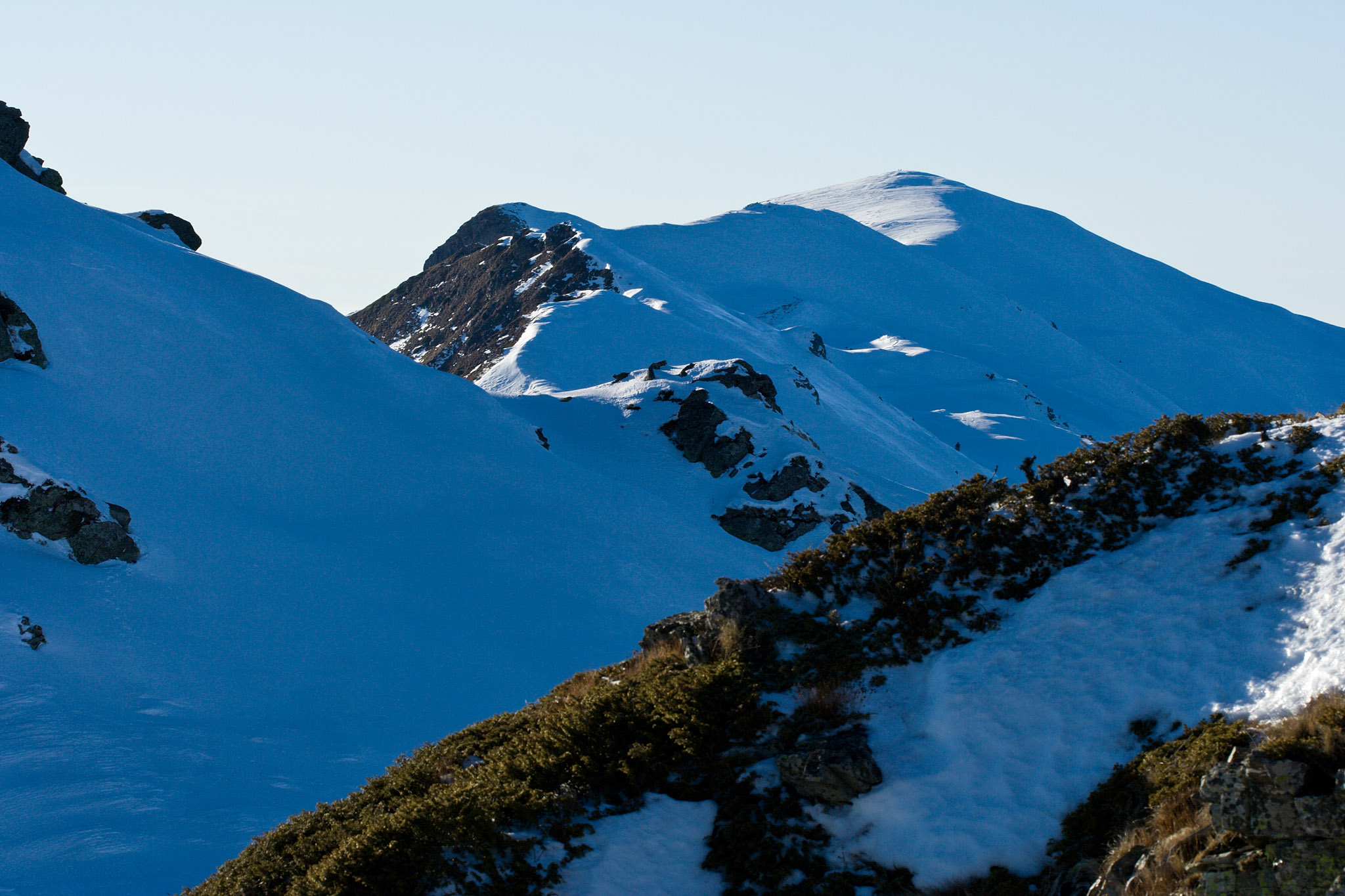
Radomir/Kalabak/Kerkini, Belasitsa, Bulgaria and Greece

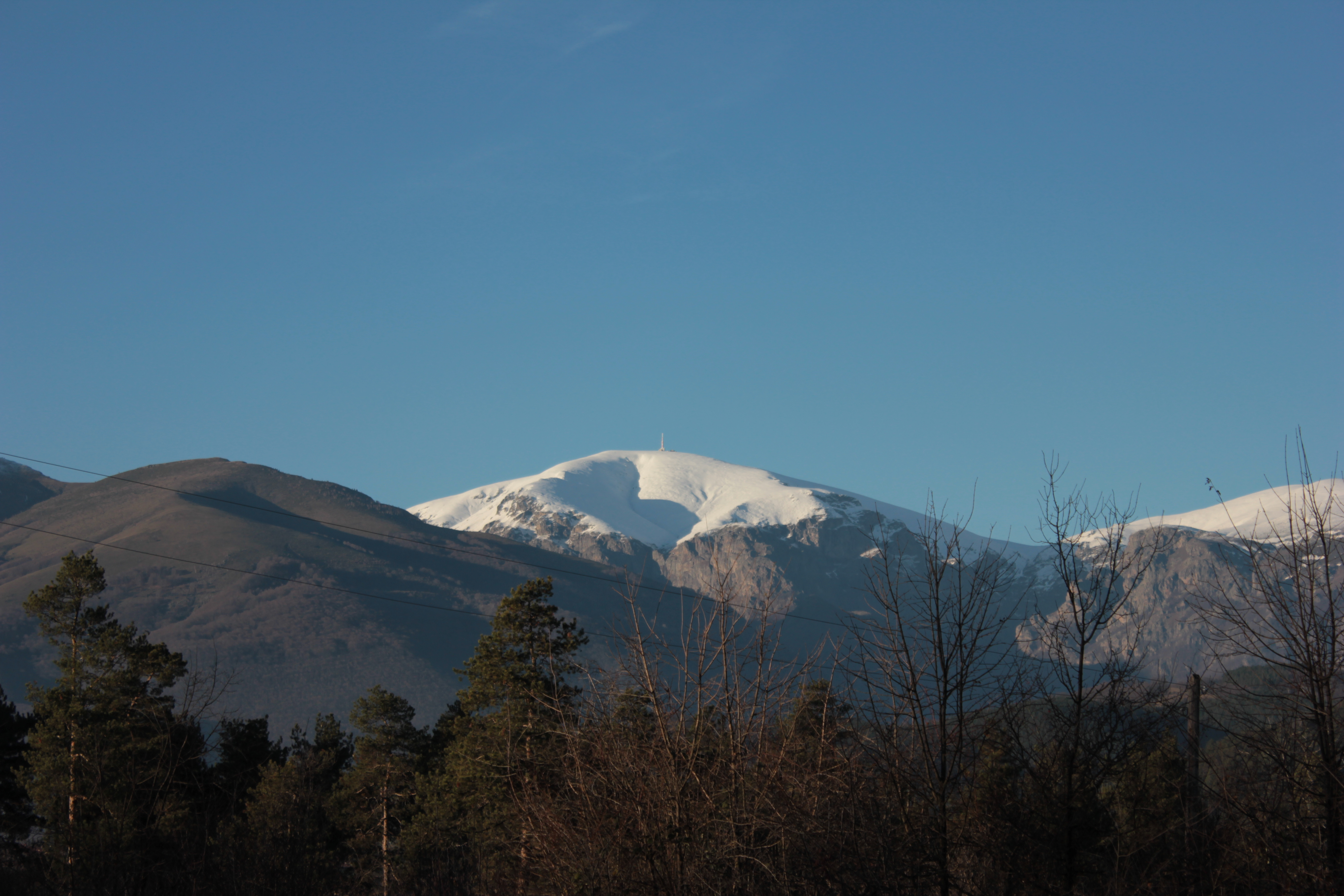
View of Botev Peak from I-6 road (Bulgaria)

No	Mountain/Peak	Country	Elevation (m)	Prominence (m)	Col (m)
1	Rila/Musala	Bulgaria	2,925	2,473	432
2	Olympus/Mytikas	Greece	2,917	2,353	564
3	Pirin/Vihren	Bulgaria	2,915	1,784	1131
4	Korab Mountain/Mount Korab	Albania / North Macedonia	2,764	2,169	595
5	Accursed Mountains/Maja Jezercë	Albania	2,694	2,036	658
6	Pindus Mountains, Smolikas Mountain/Smolikas	Greece	2,637	1,736	901
7	Jakupica Mountain/Solunska glava	North Macedonia	2,540	1,666	874
8	Nidže(Voras Mountains)/Kajmakčalan	Greece / North Macedonia	2,528	1,758	770
9	Pindus Mountains, Mount Giona/Pyramida	Greece	2,510	1,702	808
10	Nemërçkë Mountains/Maja e Papingut	Albania	2,482	1,792	690
11	Pindus Mountains, Mount Parnassus/Parnassus	Greece	2,457	1,590	867
12	Balkan Mountains, Kaloferska Mountain/Botev Peak	Bulgaria	2,376	1,567	809
13	Valamara Mountain/Maja e Valamarës	Albania	2,373	1,526	847
14	Mali i Gribës mountain/Maja e Këndrevicës	Albania	2,121	1,666	455
15	Treskvica/Mala Ćaba	Bosnia and Herzegovina	2,086	1,862	723
16	Belasitsa mountain/Radomir	Bulgaria / Greece/ North Macedonia	2,031	1,595	436
17	Mount Athos mountain/Mount Athos	Greece	2,030	2,012	18
18	Mount Ossa mountain/Mount Ossa	Greece	1,978	1,854	124
19	Pangaion Hills/Koutra	Greece	1,956	1,773	183

Triglav peak (2,864 m, prominence 2,059 m) in the Slovenian Julian Alps is geographically part of the Balkan Peninsula, as it is east of river Soča, but it is not part of the Mountain System of the Balkan Peninsula, but part of the Mountain System of the Alps.

== List of peaks and sub-peaks of the Balkans above 2800 m ==
No	Mountain/Peak	Country	Elevation (m)	Prominence (m)	Col (m)
1	Rila/Musala	Bulgaria	2,925	2,473	432
2	Olympus/Mytikas or Pantheon	Greece	2,917	2,353	564
3	Pirin/Vihren	Bulgaria	2,915	1,784	1131
4	Olympus/Olympus-Skolio	Greece	2,911	81	2830
5	Pirin/Kutelo I	Bulgaria	2,908	~298	~2610
6	Pirin/Kutelo II	Bulgaria	2,907	—	—
7	Rila/Malka Musala (Little Musala)	Bulgaria	2,902	~62	~2840
8	Olympus/Stefani or Thronos Dios (Throne of Zeus)	Greece	2,902	—	—
9	Pirin/Banski Suhodol	Bulgaria	2,884	—	—
10	Olympus/Olympus-Skala	Greece	2866	40	
11	Rila/Irechek	Bulgaria	2,852	—	—
12	Pirin/Polezhan	Bulgaria	2,851	—	—
13	Pirin/Kamenitsa	Bulgaria	2,822	—	—
14	Pirin/Malak Polezhan	Bulgaria	2,822	—	—
15	Pirin/Bayuvi Dupki	Bulgaria	2,820	—	—
16	Olympus/Aghios Antonios	Greece	2,815	—	—
17	Pirin/Strazhite	Bulgaria	2,810	—	—
18	Olympus/Profitis Ilias	Greece	2,803	—	—
19	Olympus/Toumba	Greece	2,801	—	—

== More extensive list of the highest mountains, in broader sense, in mainland Balkan Peninsula, corresponding highest peaks, and locations ==
- Rila (Musala, 2,925 m), Bulgaria, highest mountain in Bulgaria and the Balkans
  - Malyovitsa (2729), Bulgaria
  - Cherna Polyana (2716), Bulgaria
- Olympus (Mytikas, 2,917 m), highest mountain in Greece
- Pirin (Vihren, 2,915 m), Bulgaria
  - Polezhan (2851 m)
- Julian Alps (Triglav, 2,864 m), Slovenia
- Maja e Korabit (Mount Korab 2,764 m), highest point in Albania and North Macedonia
  - Šar Mountains (Titov Vrv, 2,748 m), North Macedonia
  - Gjallica (2,487 m), Albania
- Popluk/Popluks (Maja Jezercë, 2,694m), Albania, central part of Accursed Mountains
  - Maja e Popllukës (2,569 m), Albania
  - Maja e Malësores (2,490m), Albania
  - Maja e Ragamit (2,472m), Albania
  - Maja Bojs (2,461m), Albania
- Gjeravica (2,656m) Kosovo, western part of Accursed Mountains and highest point in Kosovo
- Smolikas part of Pindos (Smolikas peak, 2,637 m), Greece
- Bjeshka e Krasniqes/Mountains of Krasniqi (Maja Grykat e Hapëta, 2,625m), Albania, part of Accursed Mountains
  - Maja Briaset (2,567m), Albania
  - Maja e Hekurave (2,560m), Albania
- Baba Mountain (Pelister, 2,601 m), North Macedonia
- Radohinës/Radohimës (Maja Radohimes, 2,568m), Albania, part of Accursed Mountains
  - Maja Tat (2,541?), Albania
  - Maja e Vishnjes (2,517m), Albania
- Bjelič / Bjeljič / Bjeliq (Rodi e Kollatës, 2,556m), Albania, part of Accursed Mountains
  - Zla Kolata (2,534m), Montenegro and Albania, highest point in Montenegro
  - Dobra Kolata (2,528m), Montenegro and Albania
  - Maja e Rosit (2,524m), Montenegro and Albania
- Shkurt (Maja e Shënikut, 2,554m), Albania, part of Accursed Mountains
  - Maja Shkurt (2,499m), Albania
- Brada-Karanfili (Maja Koprishtit, 2,554m), Albania
  - Veliki vrh Karanfila (2,490m), Montenegro
  - Sjeverni vrh (2,460m), Montenegro
  - Južni vrh (2,441m), Montenegro
- Jakupica (Solunska Glava, 2,540 m), North Macedonia
- Bogićevica (Marijaš, 2,533m), Albania
  - Rops/Maja e Ropës (2,502m), Kosova
  - Pasji Peak (2,405m), Montenegro and Kosovo
  - Maja Bogiçaj (2,404m), Kosovo and Albania
- Durmitor (Bobotov Kuk, 2,523), Montenegro
- Guri i Kuq (2,522m), Albania
- Voras/Nidže (2,521 m), North Macedonia and Greece
- Gramos (2,520 m), Albania
- Komovi (Kom Kučki, 2,487m), Montenegro
- Gjallica (2,486 m), Albania
- Nemërçkë (Maja e Papingut - 2,485 m), Albania
- Koprivnik (2,460), Kosovo
- Parnassus (2,460 m), Greece
- Tomorr (Çuka e Partizanit - 2,416 m), Albania
- Shkelzen (2,407 m), Albania
- Hajla (2,403 m), Montenegro, northwestern part of Accursed Mountains
- Bioč (2,397m), Montenegro
- Koritnik (2,397 m), Albania
- Maglić (2,388 m), Montenegro
- Ostrovicë (2,383 m), Albania
- Balkan Mountains, Kaloferska Mountain (Botev Peak, 2,376 m), Bulgaria
  - Zlatishko-Tetevenska Mountain (Vezhen Peak, 2,198 m), Bulgaria
  - Chiprovska Mountain (Midžor, 2,169 m)
  - Berkovska Mountain (Kom Peak, 2,016 m), Bulgaria
- Velivar (2,375 m), North Macedonia and Albania
- Ostrovice (2,362 m), Albania
- Valamare (2,350 m), Albania
- Volujak (2,336m), Montenegro
- Vitosha (Cherni Vrah, 2,290 m) Bulgaria
- Mali i Thate (2,288 m), Albania
- Stogovo (Golem Rid, 2,278 m), North Macedonia
- Sinjajevina (2,277m). Montenegro
- Jablanice (Maja e Zeze, 2,257 m), North Macedonia and Albania
- Galičica (Magaro, 2,254 m), North Macedonia and Albania
- Osogovo (Ruen, 2,251 m), North Macedonia and Bulgaria
- Mali i Dejes (2,246 m), Albania
- Ljubišnja (2,238m), Montenegro
- Čvrsnica (2,228 m), Dinarides, Bosnia and Herzegovina
- Kapa Moračka (2,226m), Montenegro
- Shebenik (2,225 m), Albania
- Maje e Harapit (2,217 m), Albania
- Slavyanka (mountain) (Gotsev Vrah, 2,212 m), Bulgaria
- Visitor (2,210m), Montenegro, often referred as a part of Accursed Mountains
- Planinica-Mojan-Marlules (Maja Madhe, 2,194m), Albania, often referred as a part of Accursed Mountains
- Rhodopes (Golyam Perelik, 2,191 m), Bulgaria
  - Batashka Mountain (Golyama Syutkya, 2,185 m), Bulgaria
- Kuči mountains (Surdup, 2,184m), Montenegro, often referred as a part of Accursed Mountains
- Maja e Kulamkes (2,177 m), Albania
- Kožuf/Tzena (Zelenbeg, 2,171 m), North Macedonia and Greece
- Mali i Kallabakut (2,171 m), Albania
- Midžor (2,169 m), Serbia
- Bistra (Medenica, 2,163 m), North Macedonia
- Mokra Gora (Pogled, 2,156 m), Serbia and Kosovo
- Prenj (Zelena Glava, 2,155 m), Dinarides, Bosnia and Herzegovina
- Cajup (2,145 m), Albania
- Stožac (2,141m), Montenegro
- Maganik (2,139m), Montenegro
- Bjelasica (Crna glava, 2,139m), Montenegro
- Lola (2,131m), Montenegro
- Zeletin (2,126m), Montenegro, often referred as a parto of Accursed Mountains
- Maja e Kendrevices (2,120 m), Albania
- Kunora e Lures (2,120 m), Albania
- Mali i Allamanit (2,103m), Albania
- Prenj (Lupoglav, 2,102 m), Dinarides, Bosnia and Herzegovina
- Mali i Kreshtes (2,102 m), Albania
- Piva mountain (2,094m), Montenegro
- Guri i Zi (2,071 m), Albania
- Bjelašnica (2,067 m), Bosnia and Herzegovina
- Tali (2,063m), Montenegro
- Čeloica (Dobra Voda, 2,062 m), North Macedonia
- Maja e Rrunjes (2,056 m), Albania
- Çika (2,045 m), is the highest peak of the Ceraunian Mountains Albania
- Žurimi (2,036m), Montenegro
- Belasica (Radomir peak, 2,029 m), Bulgaria and Greece
- Mali i Lopes (2,022 m), Albania
- Maja e Qorres (2,018 m), Albania
- Kopaonik (Pančićev vrh 2,017 m), Serbia
- Panachaicus (1,926 m), northernmost mountain of the Peloponnese, east of Patras, Greece
- Vlahina (1,924 m), Bulgaria/North Macedonia
- Besna Kobila (1,923 m), Serbia
- Dinara (Troglav peak 1,913 m; Dinara peak 1,831 m), Dinarides, Croatia-Bosnia and Herzegovina
- Orjen (1,894 m), highest mountain in littoral Montenegro, during glacial periods the most heavily glaciated Mediterranean mountain
- Ainos (1,628 m), Greece
- Sredna Gora (1,604 m), Bulgaria
- Igman (1,502 m), Bosnia and Herzegovina
- Zlatibor (Tornik 1,496 m; Čigota 1,422 m), Serbia
- Parnitha (1,413 m), Athens, Greece
- Plana (1,338 m), Bulgaria
- Penteli (1,109 m), Athens, Greece
- Hymettus (1,026 m), east of Athens, Greece
- Sakar (Vishegrad, 895 m), Bulgaria

== See also ==
- List of mountains in Albania
- List of mountains in Bosnia and Herzegovina
- List of mountains in Bulgaria
- List of mountains in Croatia
- List of mountains in Greece
- List of mountains in Kosovo
- List of mountains in Montenegro
- List of mountains in North Macedonia
- List of mountains in Serbia
- List of mountains in Slovenia
- Most isolated major summits of Europe
- List of European ultra-prominent peaks
- List of the highest European ultra-prominent peaks
- Southernmost glacial mass in Europe
- List of highest points of European countries
- Greek names of mountains
