= Berim =

Mountain in Kosovo

- Берим
- Location within Kosovo

Highest point
- Elevation: 1,731 m (5,679 ft)
- Coordinates: 42°54′15″N 20°34′43″E

Geography
- Location: Kosovo
- Parent range: Accursed Mountains

Berim (Serbian Cyrillic: Берим) is a mountain peak of the Mokra Gora located in the municipality of Zubin Potok, Kosovo. It is 1,731 m (5,679 ft) high and is located on the Bjeshkët e Thata, or Barren Mountains. From its peak parts of Gazivoda Lake can be seen.
