= Smolare Falls =

Landform of Macedonia

Coordinates: 41°21′55″N 22°53′57″E

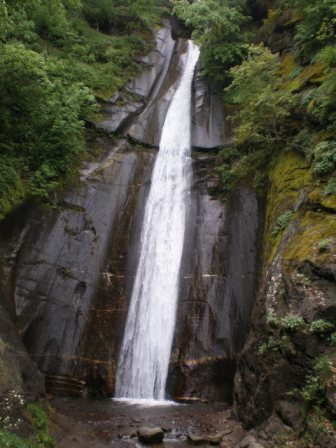
- Smolare Falls
- Interactive map of Smolare Falls
- Location: Belasica, North Macedonia
- Total height: 39.5 m (130 ft)

Smolare Falls (Macedonian: Смоларски Водопад) is a landform of Macedonia. It is located above the village of Smolare in the Municipality of Novo Selo in the southeastern region of the country.

The waterfall is part of the Lomnica River and is located deep in Mount Belasica at an elevation of 630 metres. Crashing down the smooth, black rock face, and surrounded by 100-year-old beech trees, this waterfall is visited by tourists throughout the year.

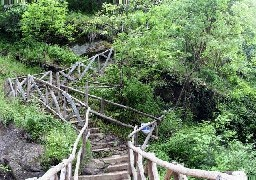
Nature trail leading to Smolare Falls including 300 stone steps

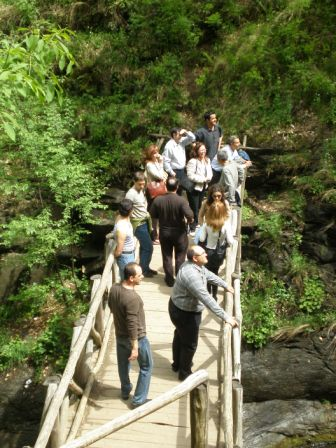
The wooden bridge in front of Smolare Falls

== See also ==
- List of waterfalls
