= Beleg (mountain peak) =

Mountain peak in Kosovo and Montenegro

- Maja Beleg; Белег
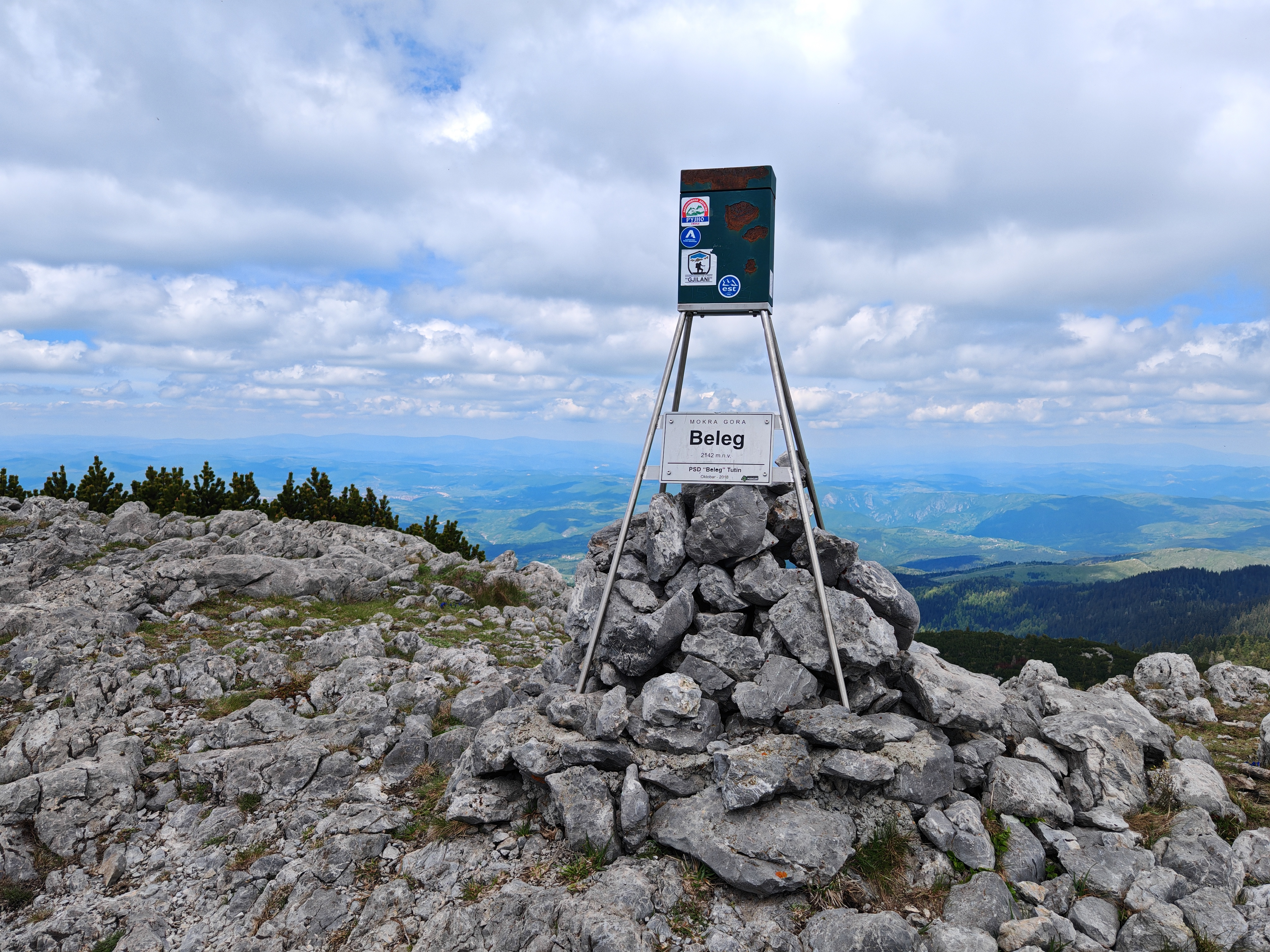

Highest point
- Elevation: 2,142 m (7,028 ft)
- Coordinates: 42°49′57″N 20°21′15″E

Geography
- Location within Serbia
- Location: Kosovo-Montenegro-Serbia border
- Parent range: Mokra Gora (Accursed Mountains)

Beleg (Albanian: Maja Beleg; Serbian Cyrillic: Белег) is a mountain peak of the Mokra Gora reaching a height of 2,142 m (7,028 ft). It is located on a three-point between Kosovo, Montenegro, and Serbia. It is the second highest peak of the Mokra Gora mountain in the Accursed Mountains range after Pogled at 2,156 m (7,073 ft).

Beleg is located a few kilometres north-west of the town of Istog in Kosovo.

== Gallery ==
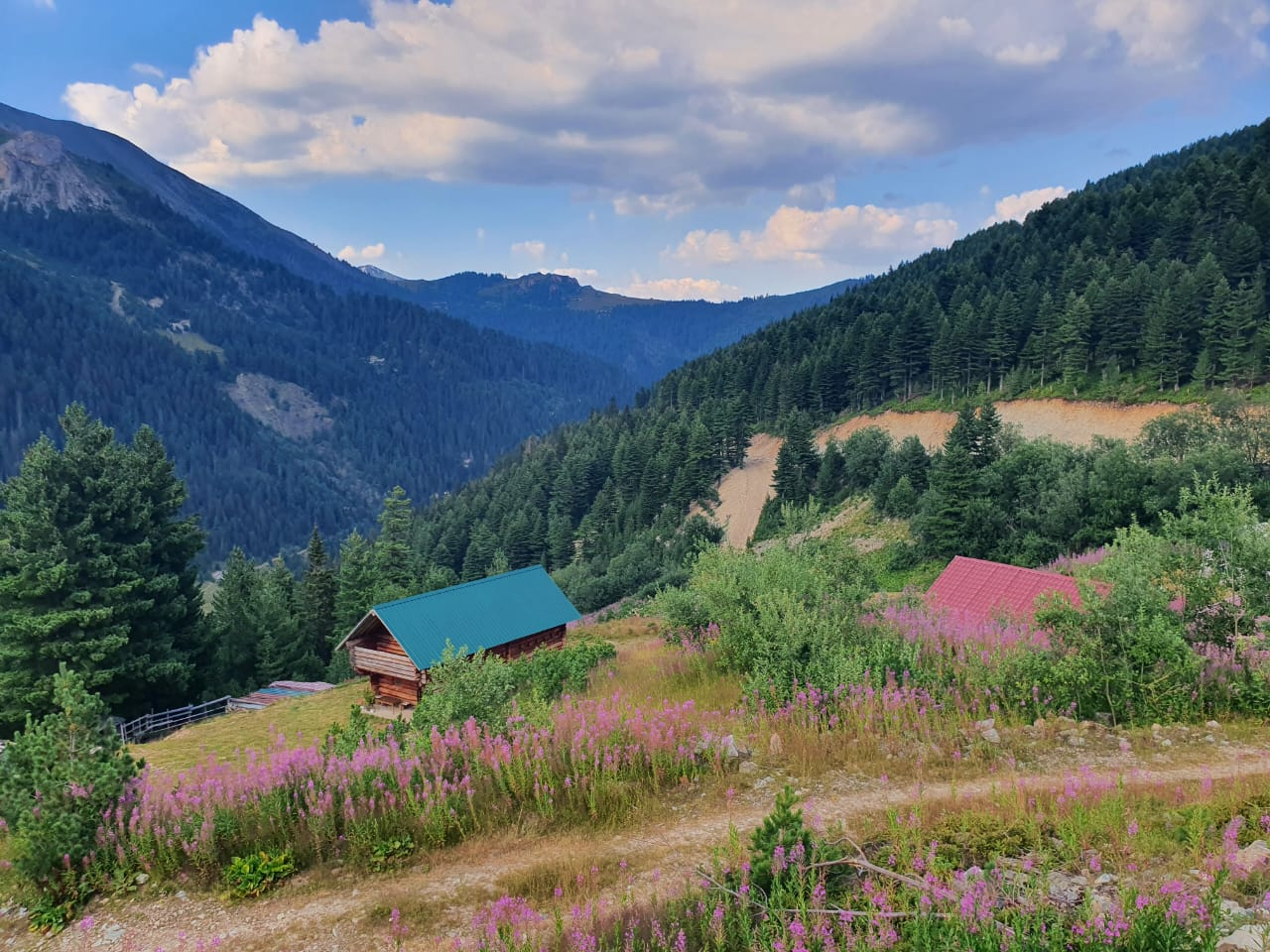
Mountain slopes in the foot of Beleg Peak
