= Maja e Rragamit =

- Location within Albania

Highest point
- Elevation: 2,472 m (8,110 ft)
- Coordinates: 42°26′25″N 19°50′09″E

Geography
- Location: Albania

Maja e Rragamit is a mountain in the Accursed Mountains range in Albania. Reaching 2,472m elevation, it is located 2 km east of Maja Jezercë, the highest point of the range and the Dinaric Alps.
