= Maja e Malësores =

Summit in Albania

- Location within Albania

Highest point
- Elevation: 2,490 m (8,170 ft)
- Prominence: 175 m (574 ft)
- Isolation: 1.9 km (1.2 mi)
- Coordinates: 42°26′52″N 19°47′25″E

Naming
- English translation: Highlander's Peak

Geography
- Country: Albania
- Region: Albanian Alps
- Municipality: Tropojë
- Parent range: Accursed Mountains

Geology
- Mountain type: summit
- Rock type: limestone

Maja e Malësores (lit. 'Highlander's Peak') is a summit in the Albanian Alps, rising to an elevation of 2,490 m (8,170 ft) above sea level. Forming part of the Kolajve ridgeline, it is located in the central section of the Accursed Mountains range, approximately 1.5 kilometers northwest of Jezercë, the highest peak of the range.

== Climbing route ==
The ascent to Maja e Malësores begins from the village of Vuthaj, passing through Zastan (a border outpost) and the valley of Buni i Jezercës. The route continues along the trail toward Maja e Bojës before turning left toward the summit.

Under winter conditions, when snow and fog are present, the route becomes significantly more challenging.

The hiking distance is approximately 24 km (round trip), with an elevation gain of about 1,700 m. The ascent usually takes around six hours, while the descent typically requires four hours, depending on weather conditions and the hiker's level of experience.

== See also ==
- List of mountains in Albania
