= Pogled (mountain peak) =

- Поглед; Pogledi
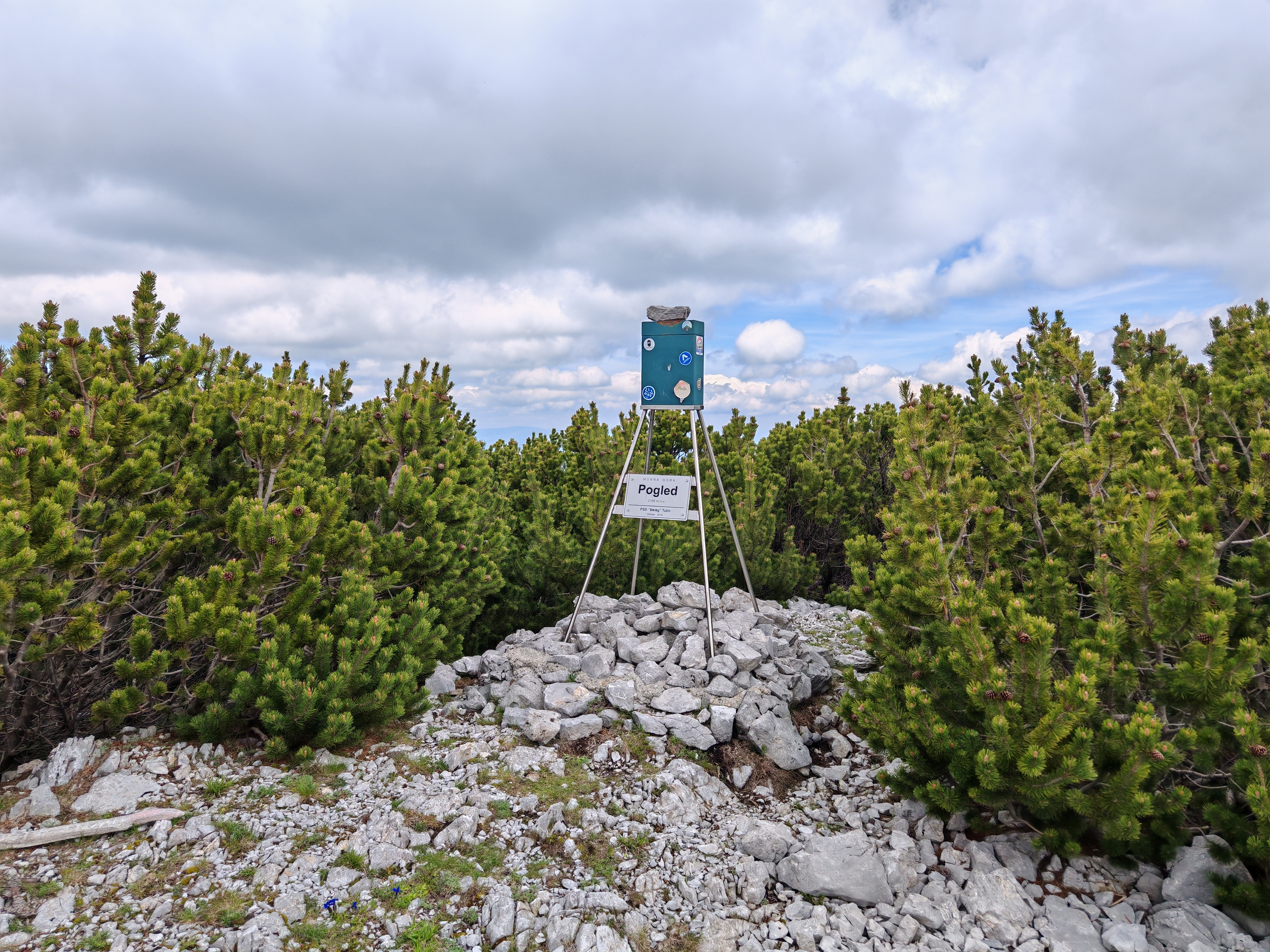
- View of Pogled mountain peak, June 2025

Highest point
- Elevation: 2,156 m (7,073 ft)
- Coordinates: 42°49′56″N 20°21′49″E

Geography
- Location within Serbia
- Location: Kosovo—Serbia border
- Parent range: Mokra Gora (Accursed Mountains)

Pogled (Serbian Cyrillic: Поглед; Albanian: Pogledi) is a mountain peak of Mokra Gora, situated on the border between Kosovo and Serbia. With an elevation of 2,156 meters, it is the highest peak of Mokra Gora mountain in the Accursed Mountains range. It lies just east of Mokra Gora's second highest peak, Beleg.
