= Ostrovicë =

Mountain chain in Albania

- Mali i Ostrovicës
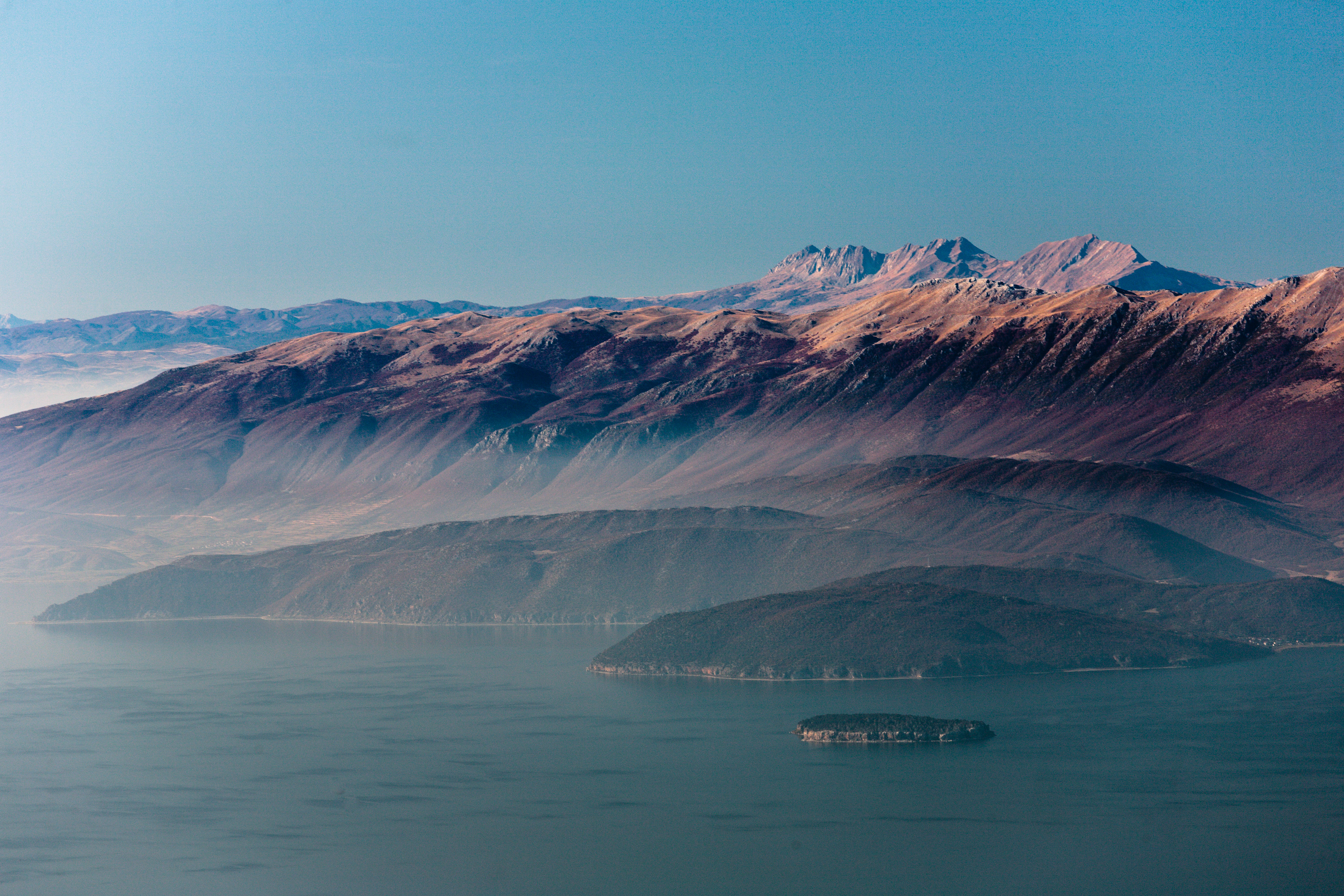
- View of Ostrovicë from Mt. Pelister with Lake Prespa in the foreground.

Highest point
- Elevation: 2,383 m (7,818 ft)
- Prominence: 153 m (502 ft)
- Isolation: 2.7 km (1.7 mi)
- Listing: Ribu
- Coordinates: 40°31′56″N 20°25′31″E

Geography
- Location within Albania
- Country: Albania
- Region: Central Mountain Region
- Municipality: Korçë, Skrapar
- Parent range: Ostrovicë-Bofnjë

Geology
- Rock age: Mesozoic
- Mountain type: massif
- Rock type(s): limestone, flysch

Ostrovicë (def. 'Ostrovica') is a massif situated on the border between Korçë and Skrapar municipalities, in southeastern Albania. Its highest peak, Çuka e Faqekuqit, reaches a height of 2,383 m (7,818 ft). It lies between the Çemericë river valley, a branch of Devoll river, in the east and the Çorovodë river valley, a branch of Osum river, in the west. Ostrovica boasts one of the tallest peaks of the southeastern region.

== Geology ==
Composed primarily of Mesozoic limestone and flysch, the mountain mass features steep slopes with glacial and karst relief forms that can be observed on its ridge. On the foothills, numerous springs emerge, which feed several branches of Osum and Devoll.

== Biodiversity ==
The vegetation consists mainly of alpine pastures. At the base of the mountain there are several settlements including Mazrek, Faqekuq, Çemericë, Gjonbabas and Lekas.

== See also ==
- List of mountains in Albania
