= Mokra Gora (mountain) =

Mountain in Kosovo, Montenegro and Serbia

- Мокра Гора; Malet e Moknës
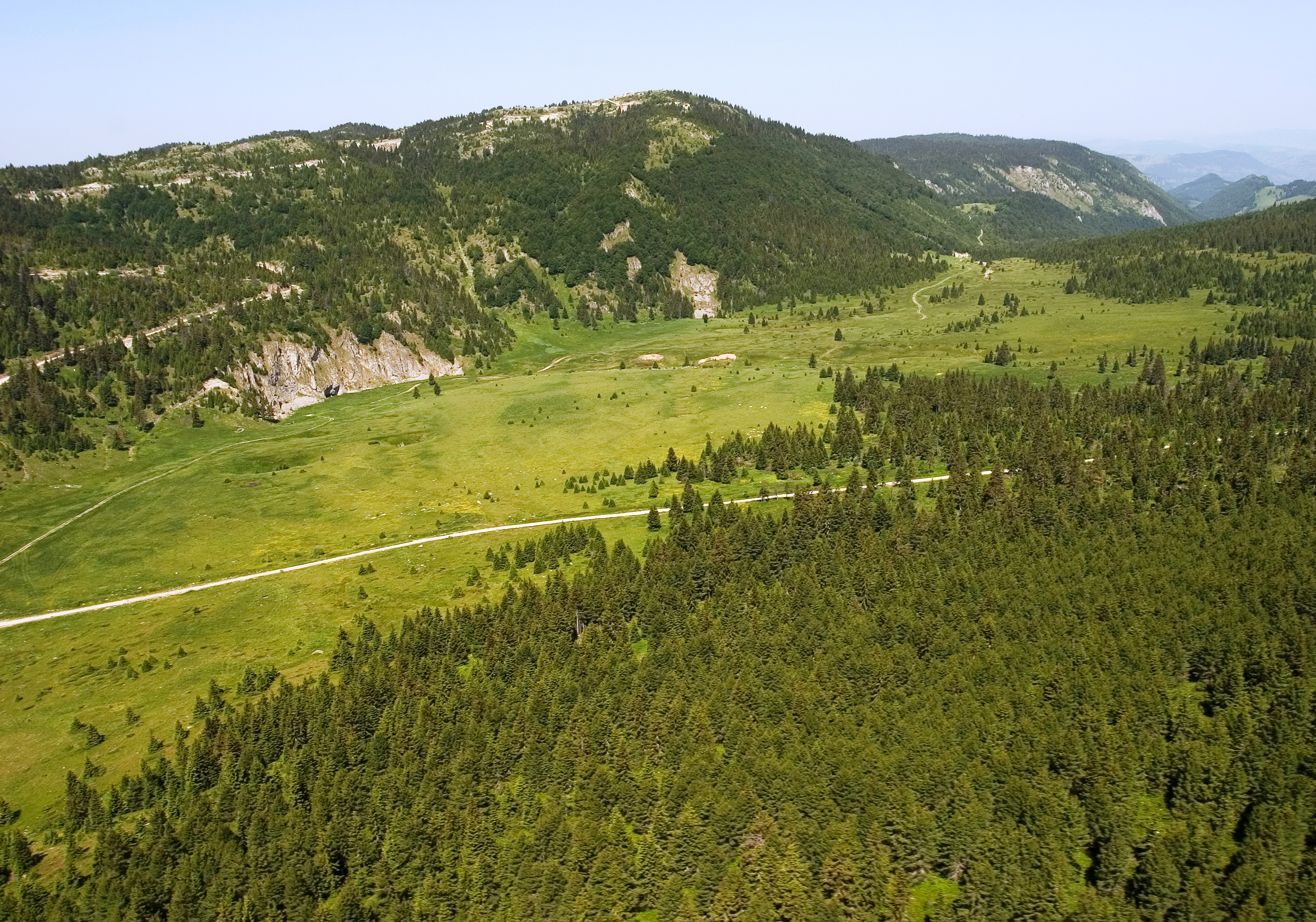

Highest point
- Elevation: 2,156 m (7,073 ft)
- Coordinates: 42°49′56″N 20°21′49″E

Geography
- Location within Kosovo Location within Montenegro Location within Serbia
- Location: Kosovo, Montenegro, Serbia
- Parent range: Dinaric Alps

Climbing
- Easiest route: Hike from Vrba village (Serbia)

Mokra Gora (Serbian Cyrillic: Мокра Гора, lit. 'Wet Mountain', pronounced [môkraː ɡǒra]; Albanian: Malet e Moknës) is a mountain on the border between Kosovo, Montenegro and Serbia.

It has two peaks higher than 2,000 m (6,562 ft). The highest is Pogled at 2,156 m (7,073 ft), and the other is Beleg at 2,142 m (7,028 ft). The Pogled peak is shared between Serbia and Kosovo, while Beleg is on the tripoint. The peak Berim is also part of this mountain. In Kosovo, the town of Istog lies just south of the mountain on the Metohija plain, which borders the mountain to the south.

Between the peaks of Mokra Gora, on the Kosovar side, lies a natural water source of clean drinking water. The source is located more than 1,800 m (5,906 ft) above sea level. The water is used by the local Water bottle brand "Ujë Mokne".

== Gallery ==
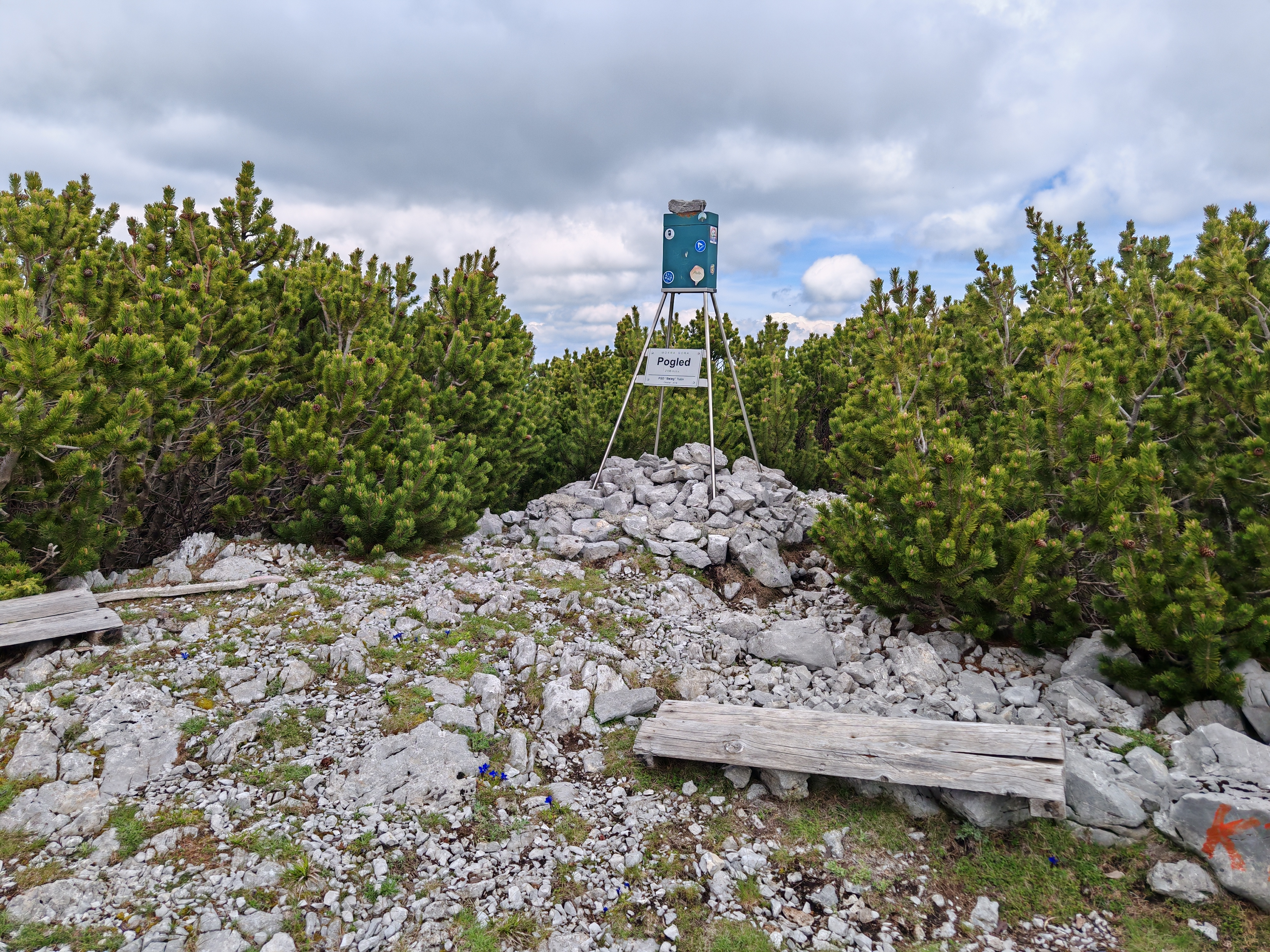
View of Pogled Peak

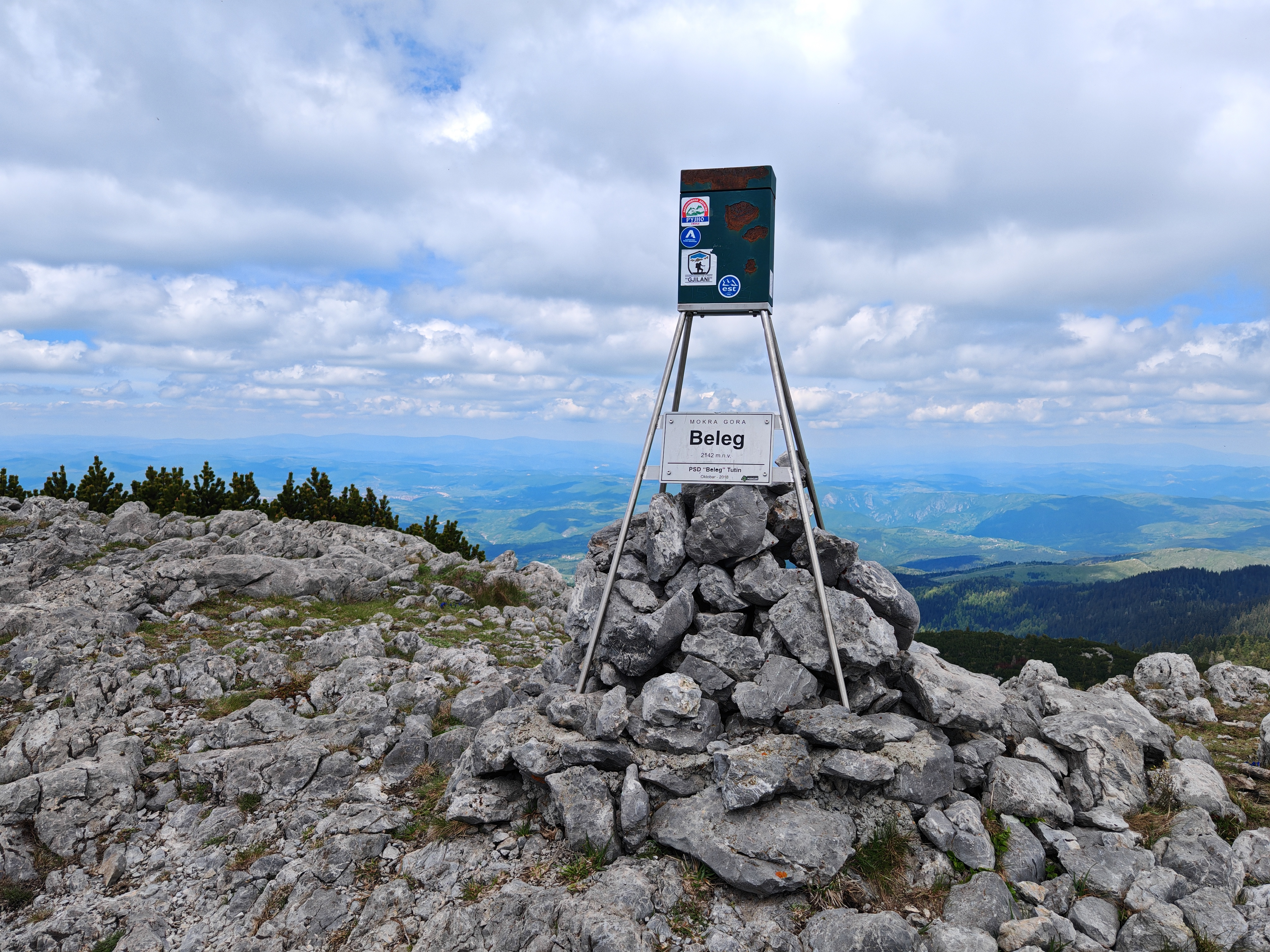
View of Beleg Peak

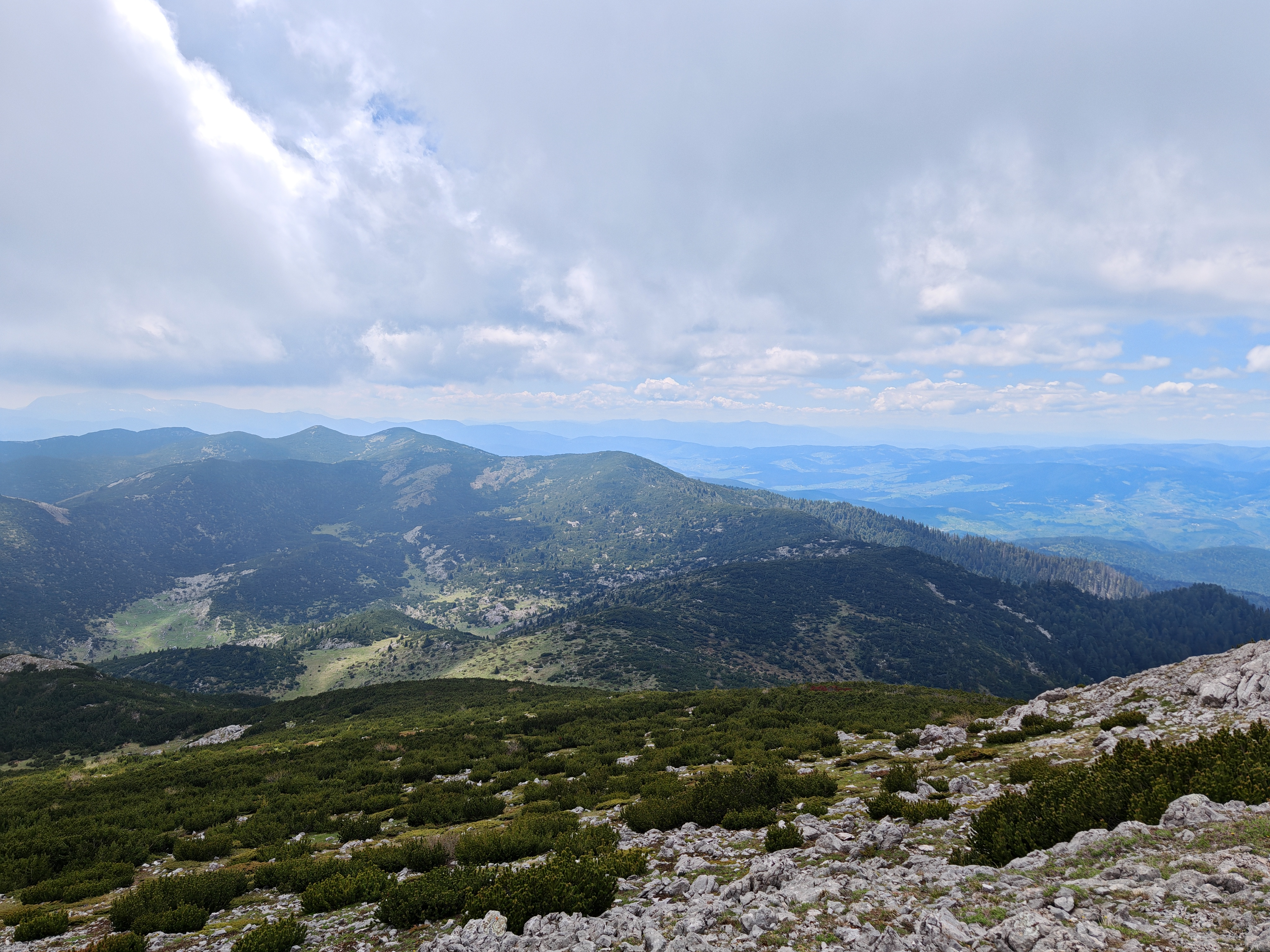
View on mountain slopes

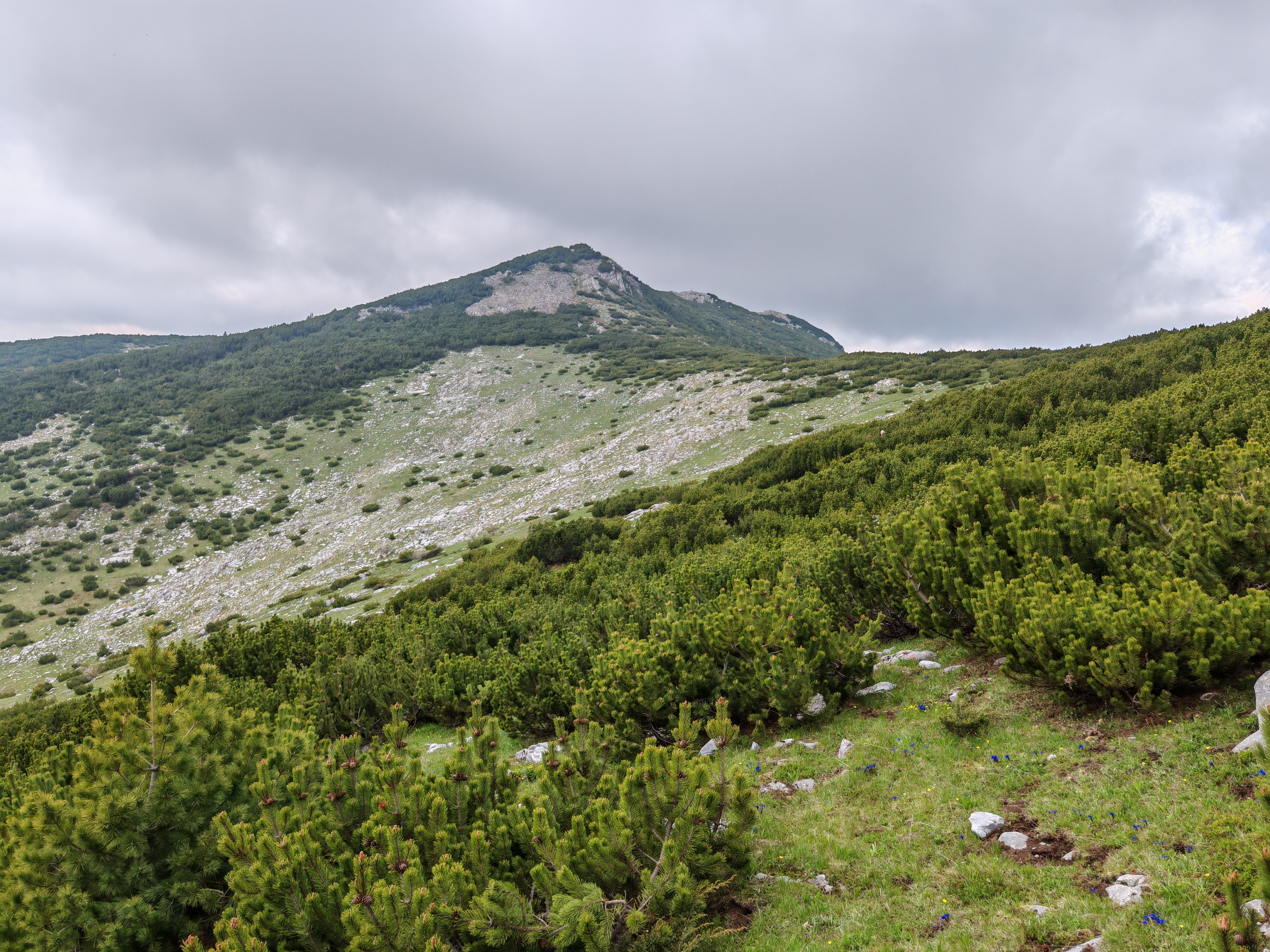
View on Sedlo and Beleg Peak

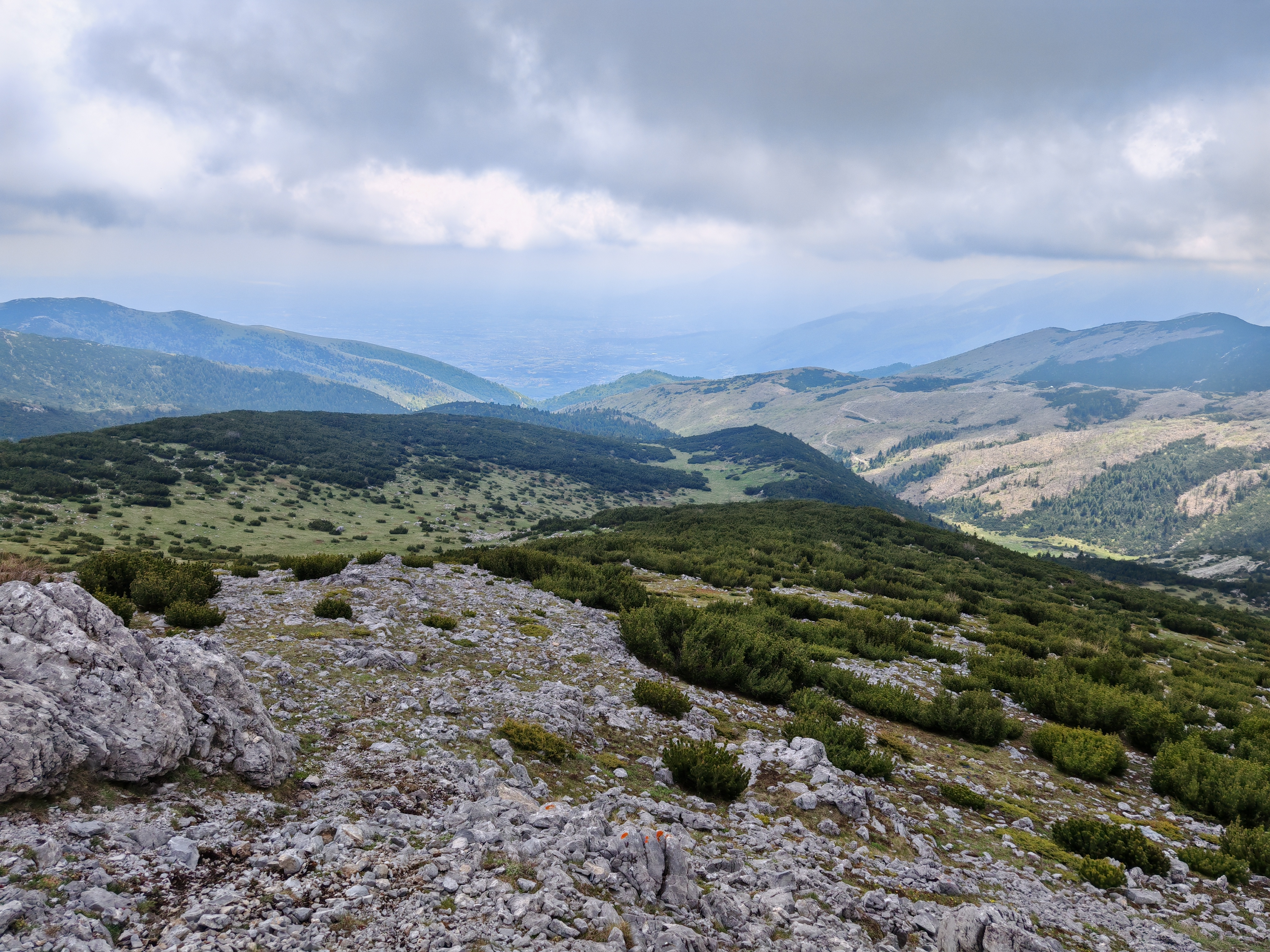
View on Metohija

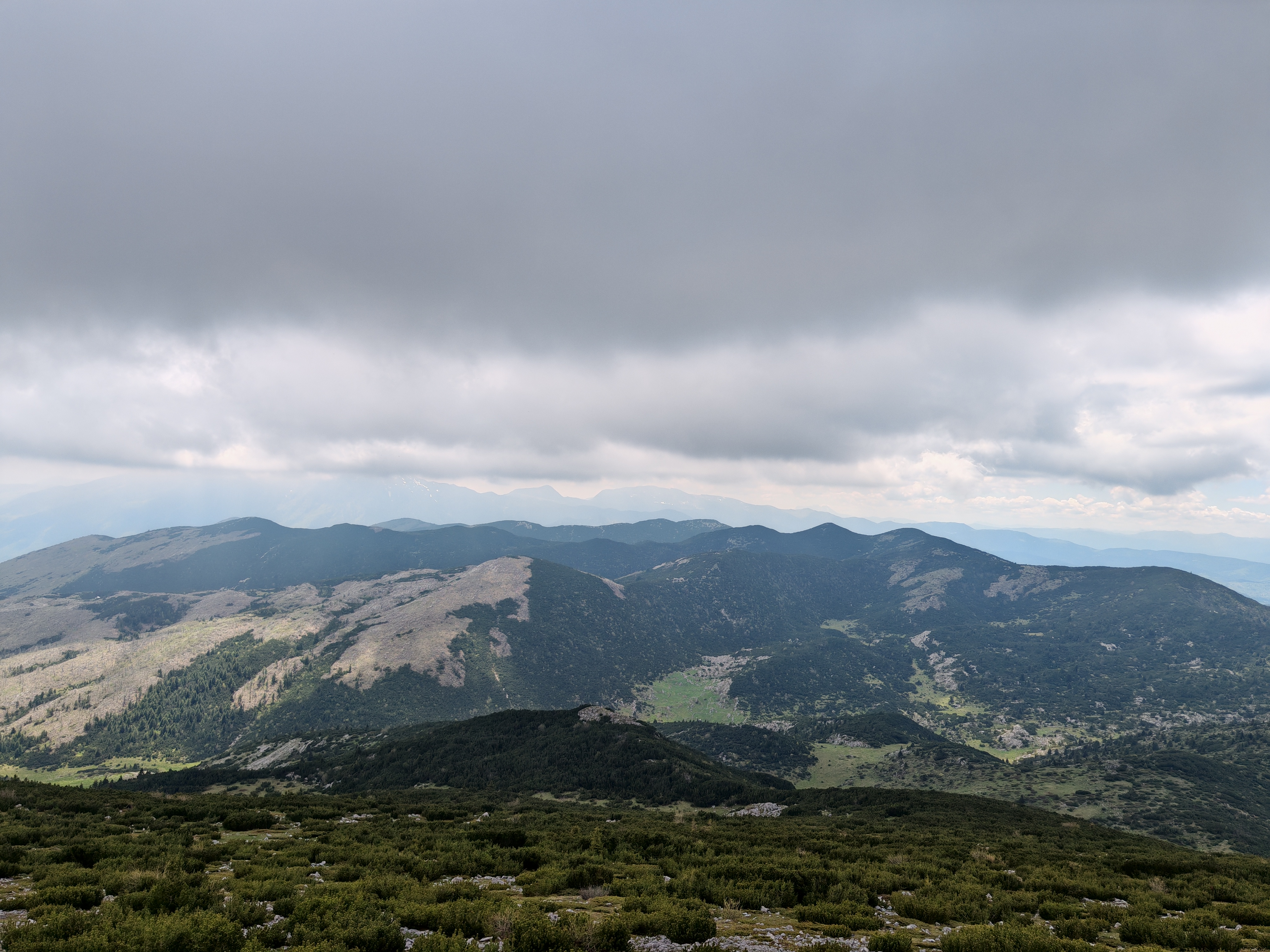
View on Montenegrin mountains

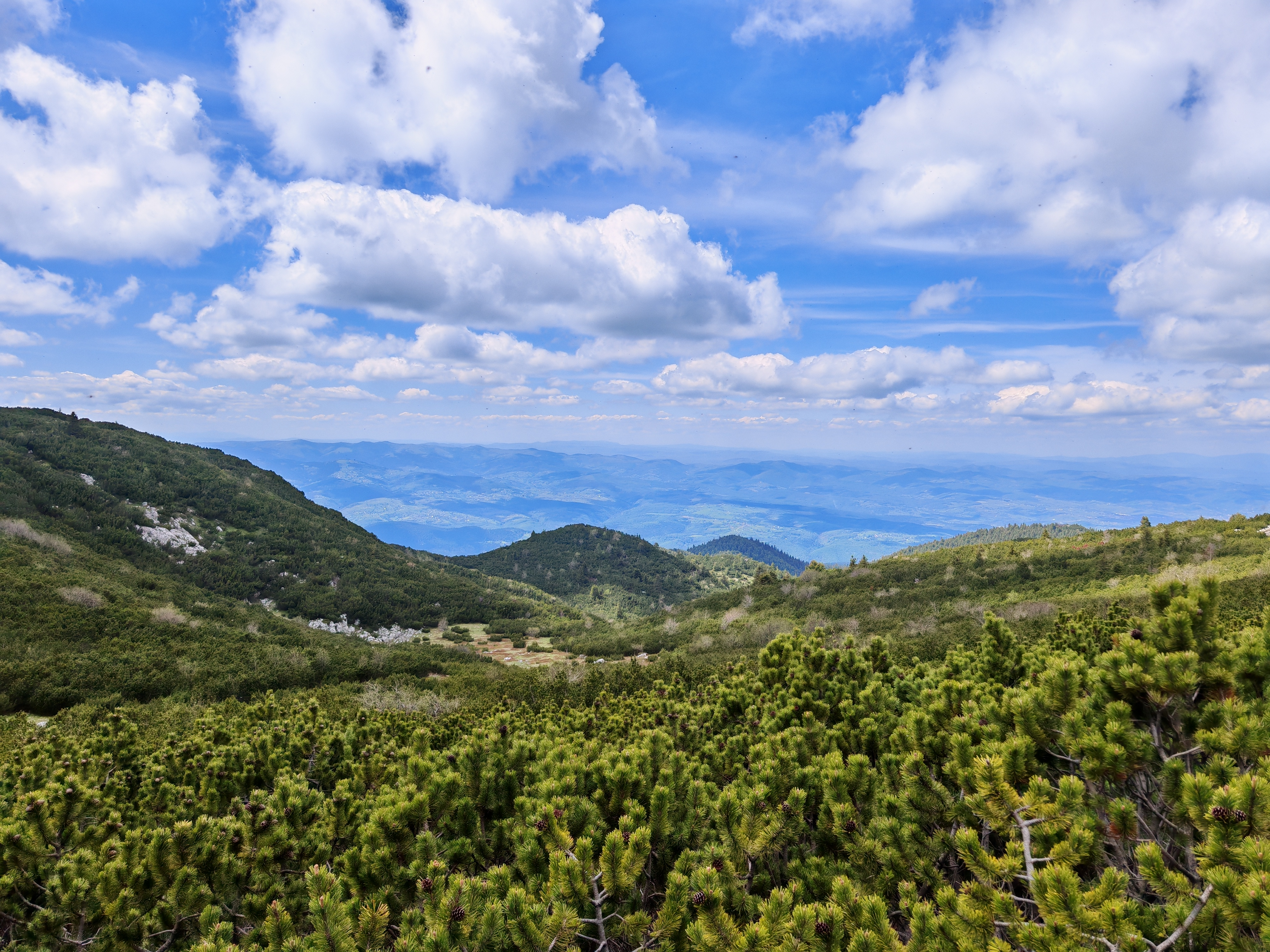
View on pine fields

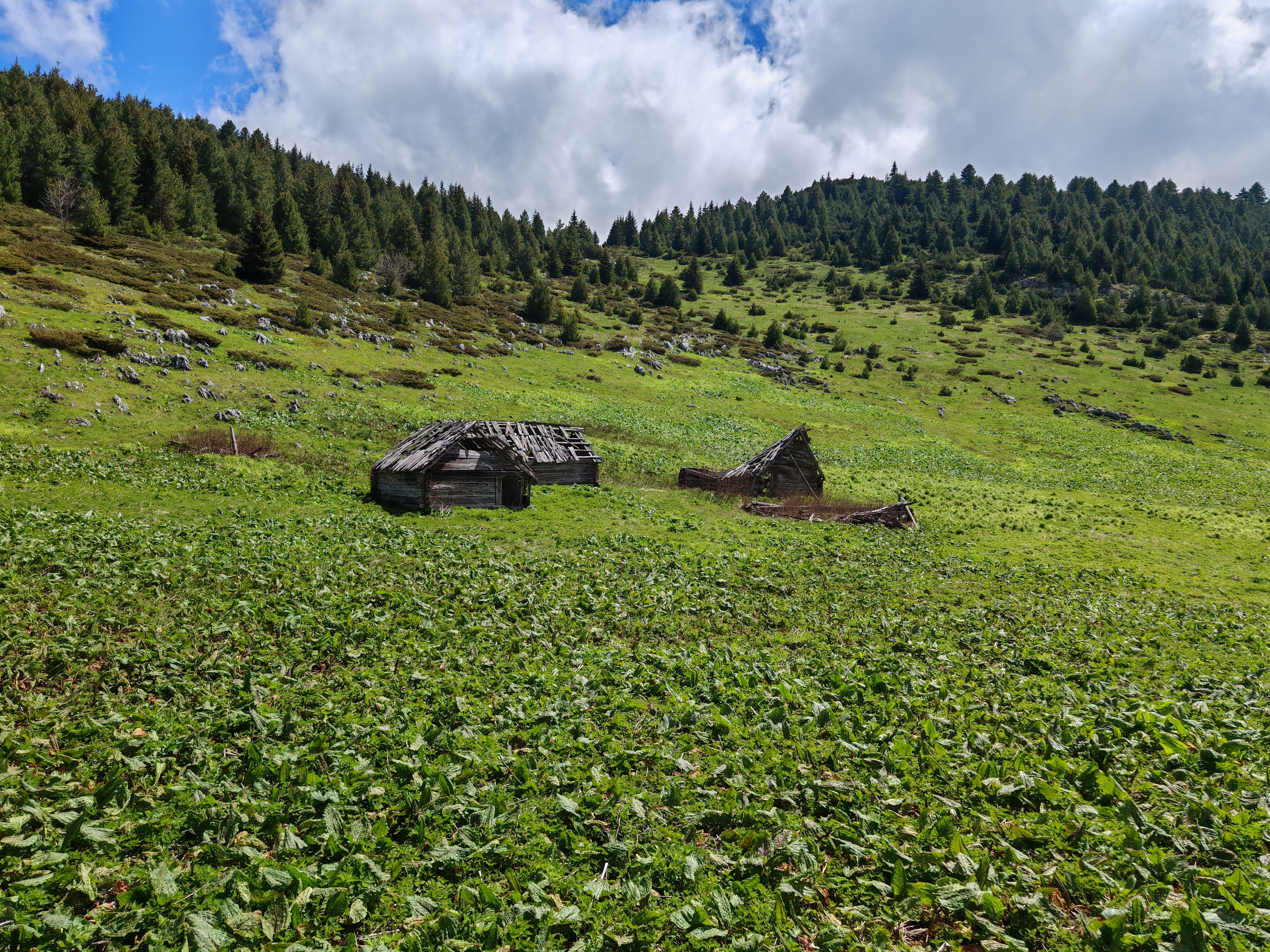
View on Zogića Stanovi katun

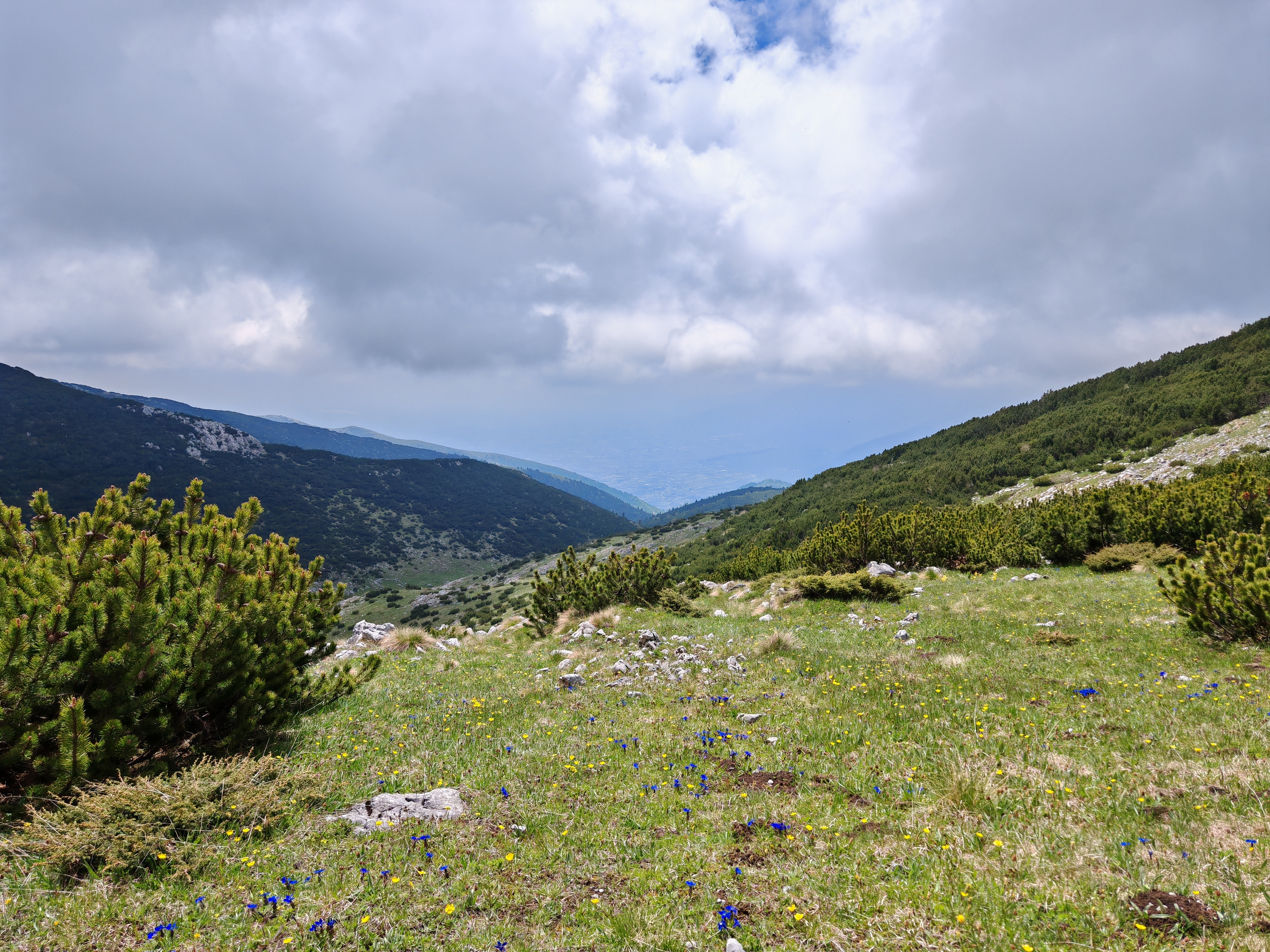
View on mountain slopes

== See also ==
- List of mountains in Kosovo
- List of mountains in Montenegro
- List of mountains in Serbia
