= Radomir (mountain) =

Mountain on the border of Greece and Bulgaria

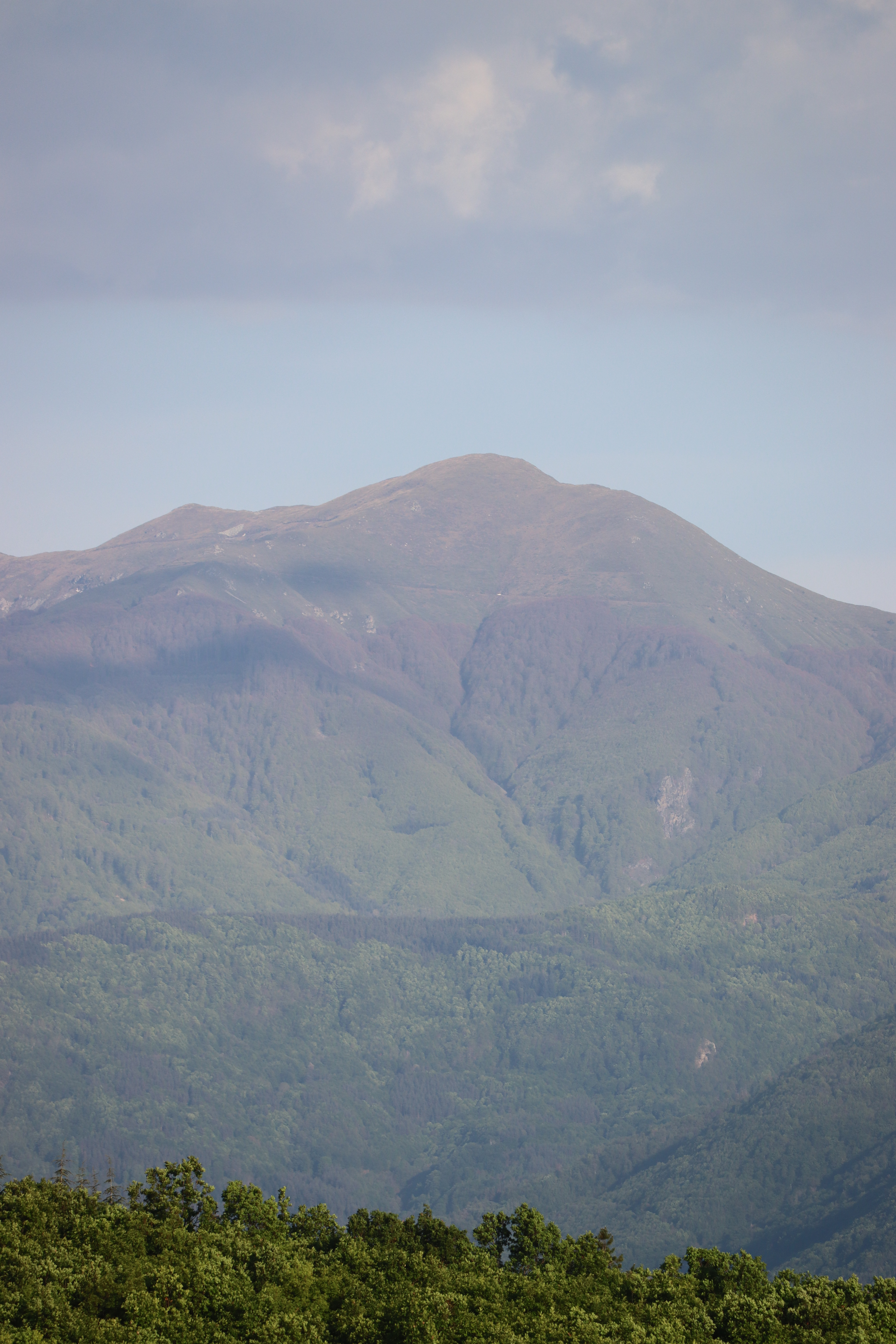
- Summit of Radomir

Highest point
- Elevation: 2,031 m (6,663 ft)
- Prominence: 1,595 m (5,233 ft)
- Listing: Ultra
- Coordinates: 41°19′18″N 23°07′19″E

Geography
- Location within Bulgaria
- Location: Blagoevgrad Province, Bulgaria and Serres regional unit, Central Macedonia, Greece
- Parent range: Belasica

Radomir (Bulgarian: Радомир) or Sidiropetra (Greek: Σιδηρόπετρα), is a mountain on the Bulgarian–Greek border. At 2,031 metres (6,663 ft) or 2,029 metres (6,657 ft) it is the highest peak in the Belasica range. It is also known by its old name Kalabak (Greek: Καλαμπάκα).

In Bulgarian since 1942, the peak was named after the Bulgarian Emperor Gavril Radomir who took part in the battle of Kleidion in the Belasitsa mountains.

Radomir is located 7 kilometres (4.3 mi) north of Neochori, the nearest town on the Greek side, (Note: Neochori (pop. 418) doesn't appear to have a town status. It may be a village in Kerkini municipal unit. In such case the nearest greek town to the Radomir mountain would probably be Sidirokastro, 24 kilometres (15 mi) away. The nearest village on the Bulgarian side is 4.5 kilometres (2.8 mi) distant Kolarovo (pop. 1826)) and 9 kilometres (5.6 mi) south-west of Petrich, the nearest town on the Bulgarian side.

== See also ==
- List of European ultra prominent peaks
