= Jezercë =

Mountain in Albania

- Maja e Rinisë
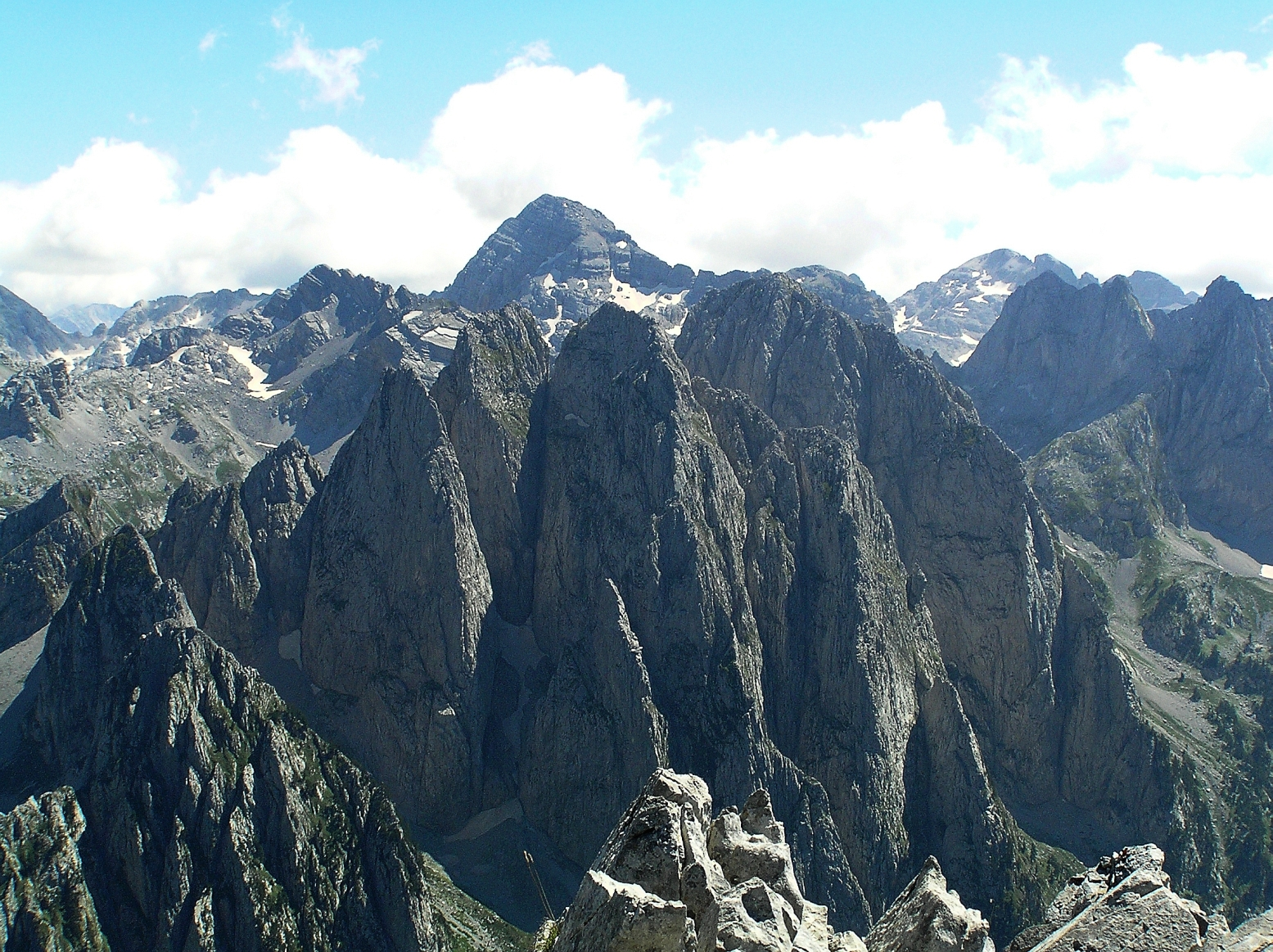
- Maja Jezercë as seen from Karanfili peak

Highest point
- Elevation: 2,694 m (8,839 ft)
- Prominence: 2,036 m (6,680 ft)
- Parent peak: Jezercë
- Isolation: 93.3 km (58.0 mi) to Mount Korab
- Listing: Ultra, Ribu
- Coordinates: 42°26′31″N 19°48′45″E

Naming
- English translation: Lakes Peak

Geography
- Location within Albania
- Country: Albania
- Region: Albanian Alps
- Municipality: Shkodër, Tropojë
- Parent range: Accursed Mountains

Geology
- Rock age: Triassic
- Mountain type: massif
- Rock type(s): limestone, dolomite

Climbing
- First ascent: 1929 by Sleeman, Elmslie and Ellwood
- Easiest route: North slope

Jezercë (Albanian definite form: Jezerca) is the highest peak in the Dinaric Alps, the second highest in Albania and sixth highest in Southeast Europe, standing at 2,694 m (8,839 ft) above sea level. It is the 28th most prominent mountain peak in Europe, and is regarded as one of the toughest and most dangerous climbs in the Accursed mountains

== Etymology ==
The toponym Jezerca derives from the Slavic word jezero 'lake', in reference to the cirque lakes in the lower part of the Buni i Jezercës on the northern side of the mountain. During communist rule, it was given the name Maja e Rinisë (lit. 'Mountain of Youth'), which never stuck.

== Geology ==
Jezercë is situated within the Accursed Mountains range, which is noted for several small glaciers - among the southernmost glacial masses in Europe after Snezhnika glacier (latitude of 41°46′09″ N) and Banski Suhodol Glacier in Pirin mountain in Bulgaria. Apart from certain areas north of the peak, the limestone mountain massif is part of the Alps of Albania National Park. It can be climbed from the north; most climbers come from Gusinje in Montenegro as well as from Theth.

The summit is 5 km (3.1 mi) from the border with Montenegro, between the valleys of Valbonë to the east and the Shala to the west. In part, the whole floor between the valley of Valbonë, Shala, Ropojana and Maja e Roshit 2,522 m (8,274 ft) is known as the Jezercë Block. Additionally, Jezercë borders other peaks such as Maja e Popllukës 2,569 m (8,428 ft) and Maja e Alies 2,471 m (8,107 ft) to the west, Maja a Rragamit 2,478 m (8,130 ft) to the east, Maja Kolaj 2,498 m (8,196 ft), Maja e Malësores 2,490 m (8,170 ft), Maja e Bojës 2,461 m (8,074 ft) in the northwest, Maja e Kokërdhakut 2,508 m (8,228 ft) and Maja e Etheve 2,393 m (7,851 ft) in the north.

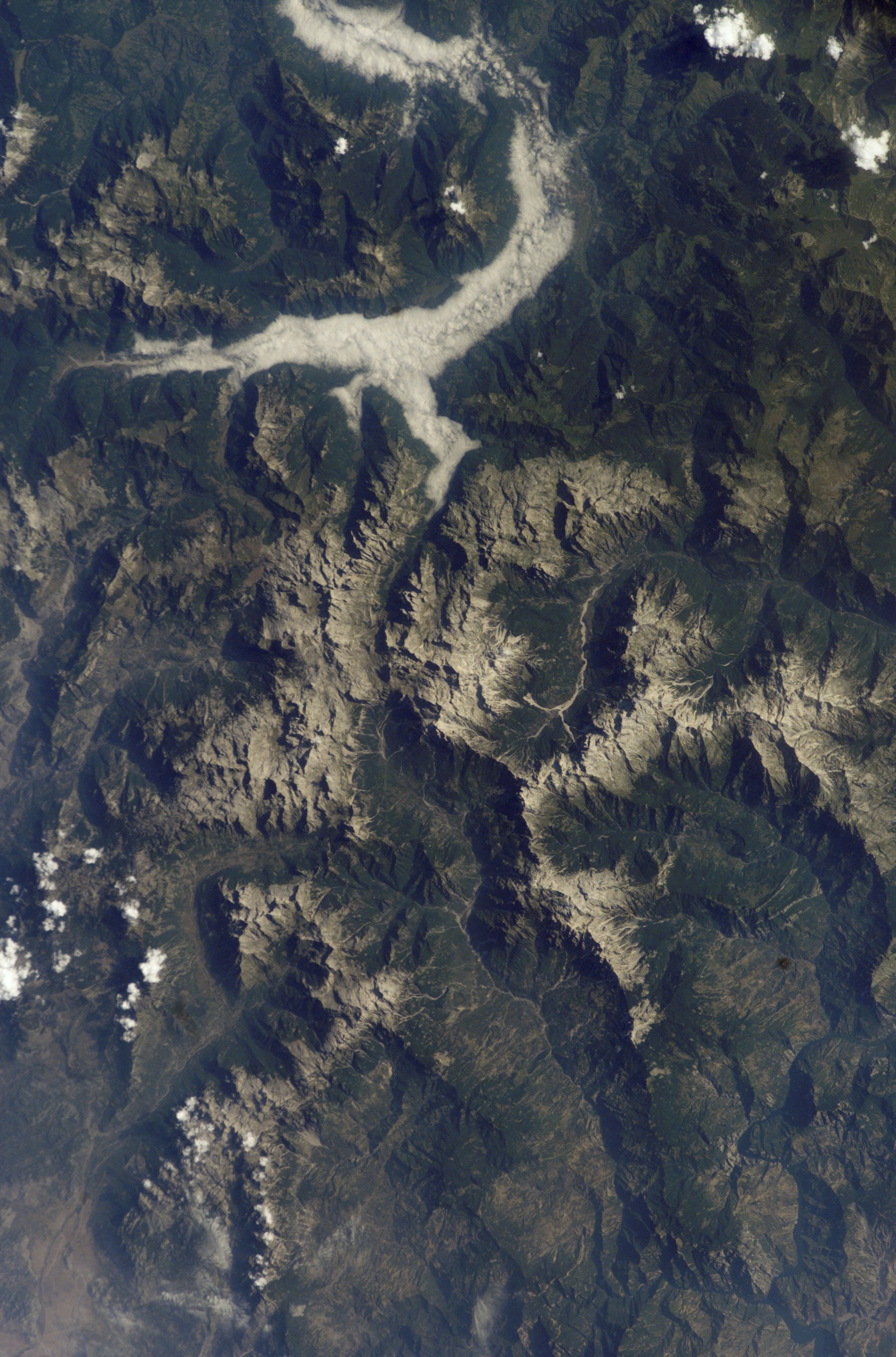
Satellite image of the Accursed Mountains, as captured by the ISS, with Jerzeca Block at the center (2002).

Jezerca is a large rocky peak of dolomitic limestone. There is almost no vegetation there. North, east and west of the mountain top is in great cirque from that in the glacial periods when glaciers were more extensive than today. Today the northern cirque is called Buni i Jezercës at a height of 1,980 metres (6,500 ft) and 2,100 metres (6,900 ft) in height around 400 metres (1,300 ft). Because it is located in the wettest region of Europe with around 6 metres (240 in) of rainfall equivalent believed to fall on the western slopes, snowfall is so great that only in dry years do even the less exposed sections melt away.

== See also ==
- List of mountains in Albania
- List of non-Alpine European Ultras
