= Belasica =

Mountain range in southeastern Europe

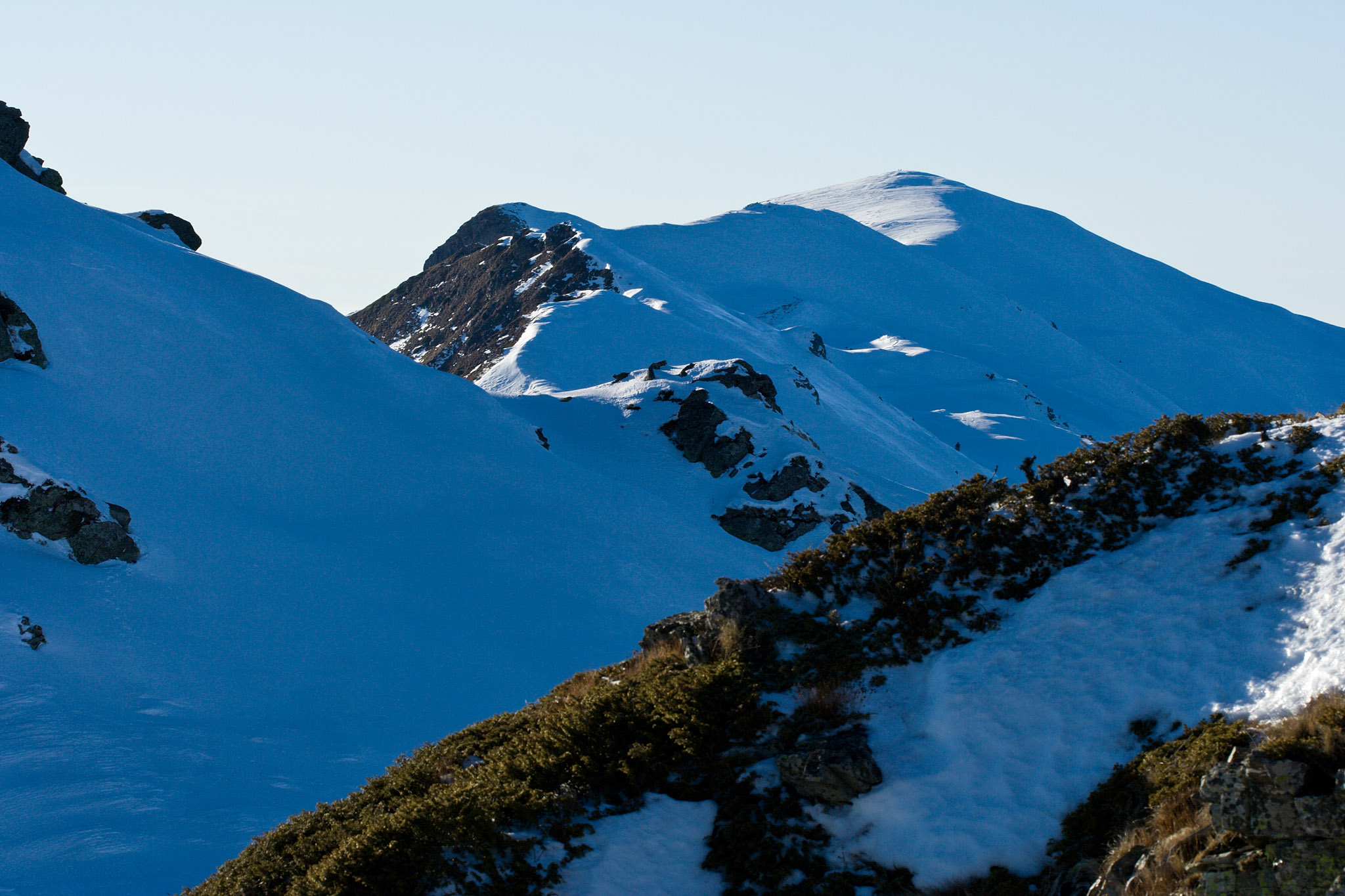
- Kalabak (Radomir) – the highest summit in Belasitsa mountain.

Highest point
- Peak: Radomir
- Elevation: 2,029 m (6,657 ft)

Naming
- Native name: Κερκίνη (Greek); Μπέλλες (Greek); Беласица (Macedonian); Беласица (Bulgarian)

Geography
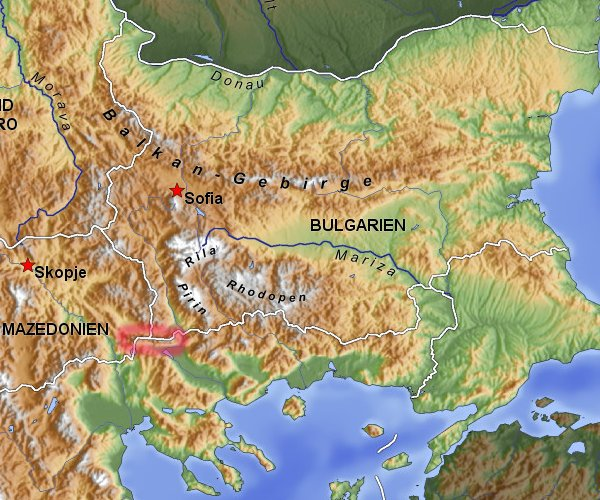
- Location of Belasica (circled in red)
- Countries: Greece, North Macedonia and Bulgaria
- Range coordinates: 41°20′19″N 22°55′39″E

Belasica (Macedonian and Bulgarian: Беласица, also translit. Belasitsa or Belasitza, Ottoman Turkish: بلش Turkish: Beleş), Belles (Greek: Μπέλλες, Bélles) or Kerkini (Greek: Κερκίνη, Kerkíni;), is a mountain range in the region of Macedonia in Southeastern Europe, shared by northeastern Greece (about 45%), southeastern North Macedonia (35%) and southwestern Bulgaria (20%).

== Geography ==
The mountain range is fault-block mountain about 60 km (37.28 mi) long and 7 to 9 km (4.35 to 5.59 mi) wide and is situated just northeast of Dojran Lake. The highest point is Radomir (Kalabaka) at 2,031 m, with elevation otherwise ranging between 300 and 1900 m above sea level. The borders of all three countries meet at Tumba Peak. The climate in the area shows strong Mediterranean influence.

The area of Belasica became a euroregion in 2003. Two football teams are named after the mountain range, PFC Belasitsa from the nearby Bulgarian town of Petrich and FK Belasica from Strumica in North Macedonia.

== History ==
Since ancient times Greeks refer to the range as Ὄρβηλος (Greek: [ˈor.vi.los], Ancient Greek: [ˈor.bɛː.los]). According to the ancient authors it was a mountain range in the border area between Thrace and Macedonia. It is generally equated today with the modern Belasica. The name Órbēlos is probably derived from the ancient Thracian/Paionian toponym of the mountain, which means "shining mountain", from belos – "blazing" or "shining", and or – "mountain". It was known for its Dionysos cult.

The area is also particularly famous for the Battle of Kleidion of 1014, which proved crucial for the fall of the First Bulgarian Empire.

== Honour ==
Kongur Glacier on Smith Island, South Shetland Islands is named after the peak and nature reserve of Kongur on Belasitsa Mountain.

== Photo gallery ==
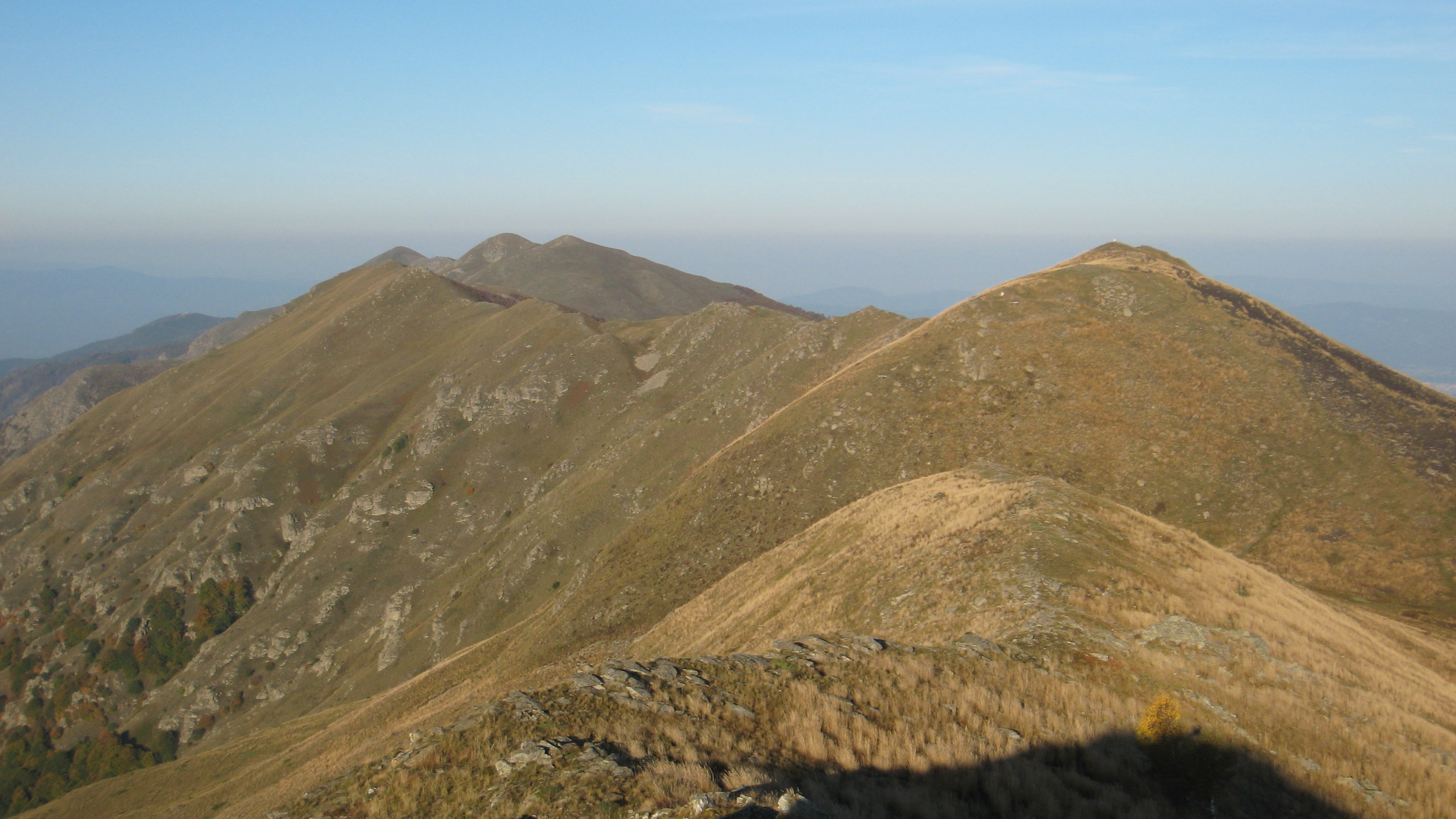
Looking along the main ridge

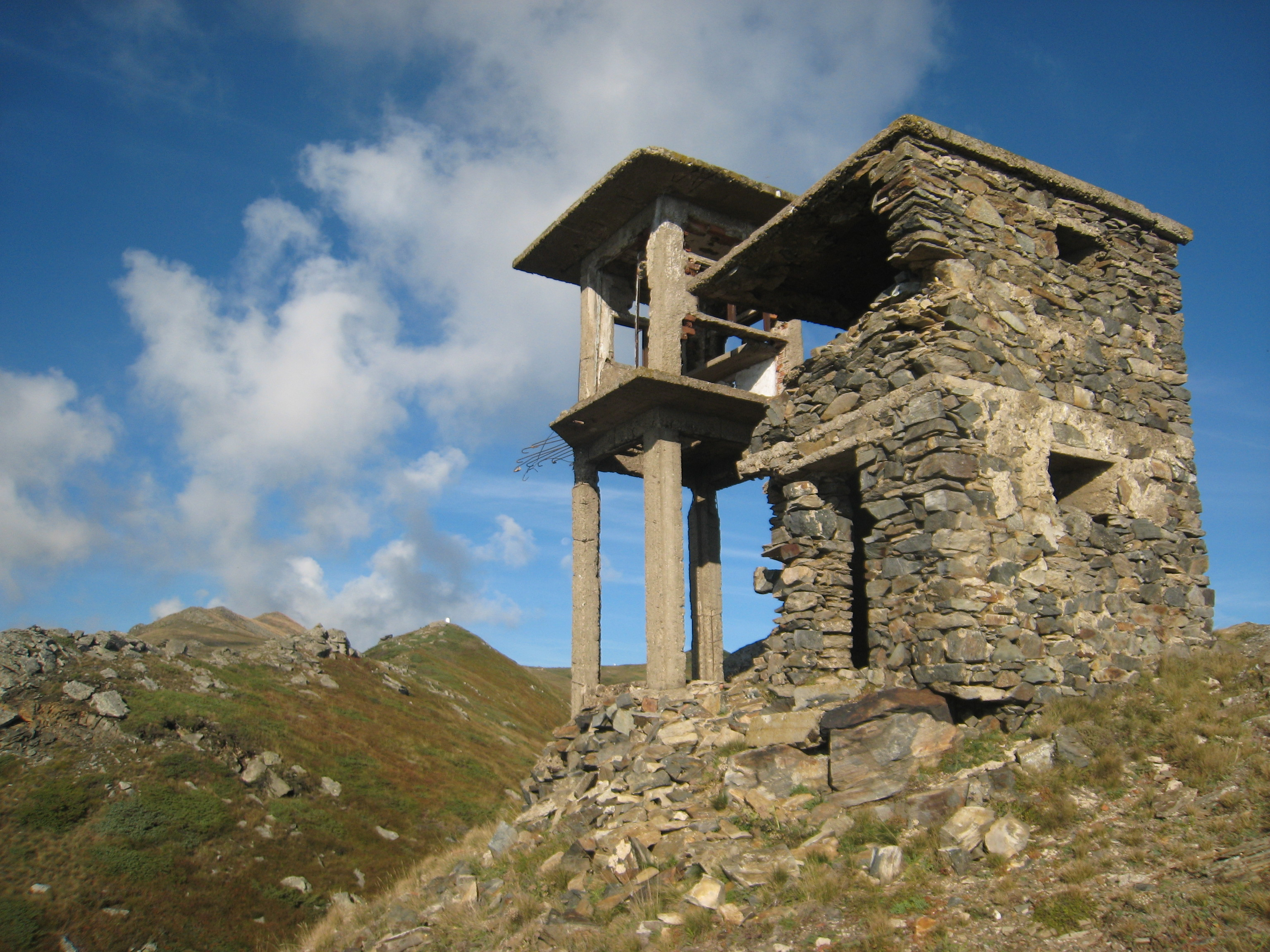
One of many ruined watchtowers on the Bulgarian side of the ridge

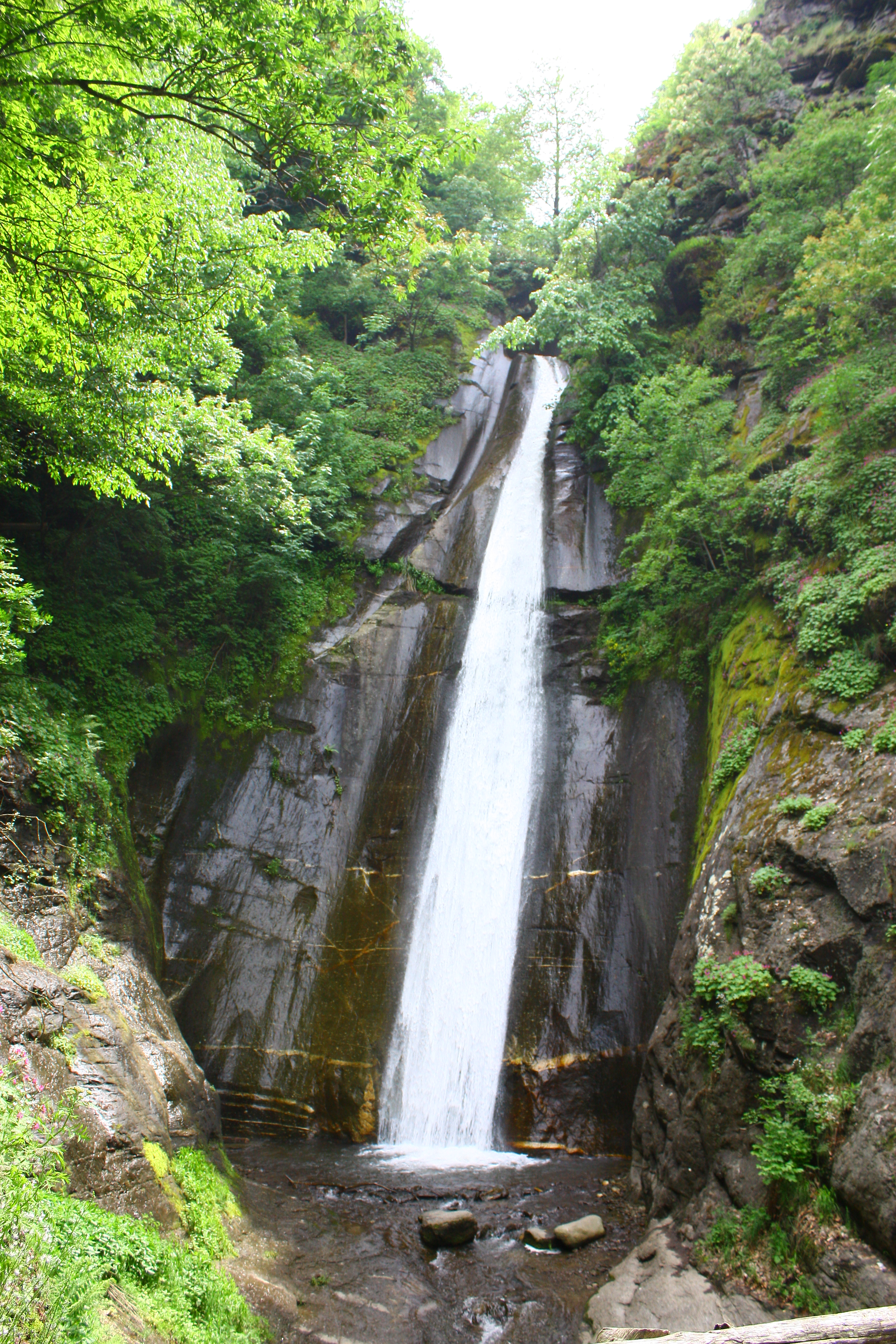
Smolare Falls on Belasica in North Macedonia

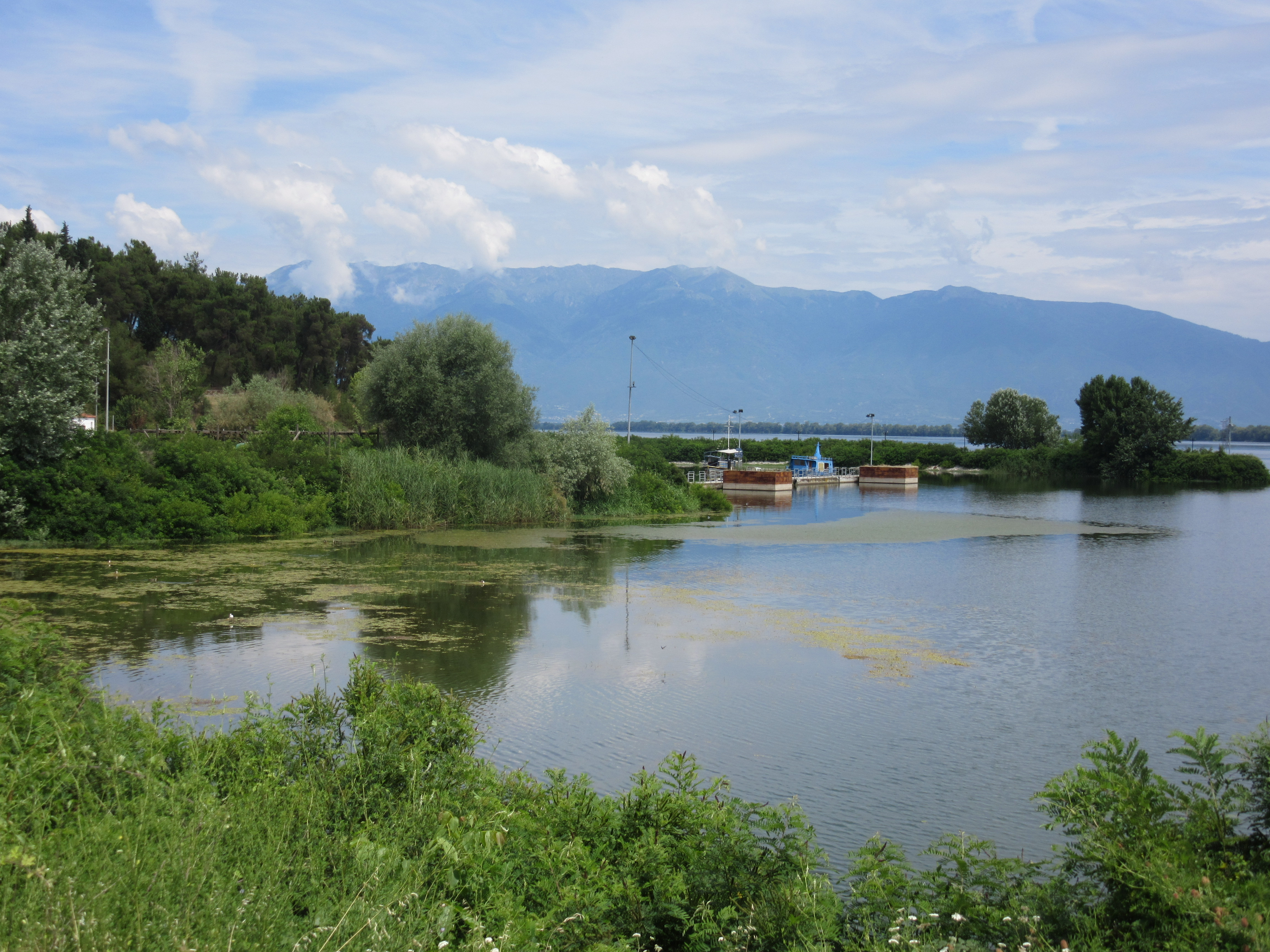
View of Belasica mountain range from Lake Kerkini

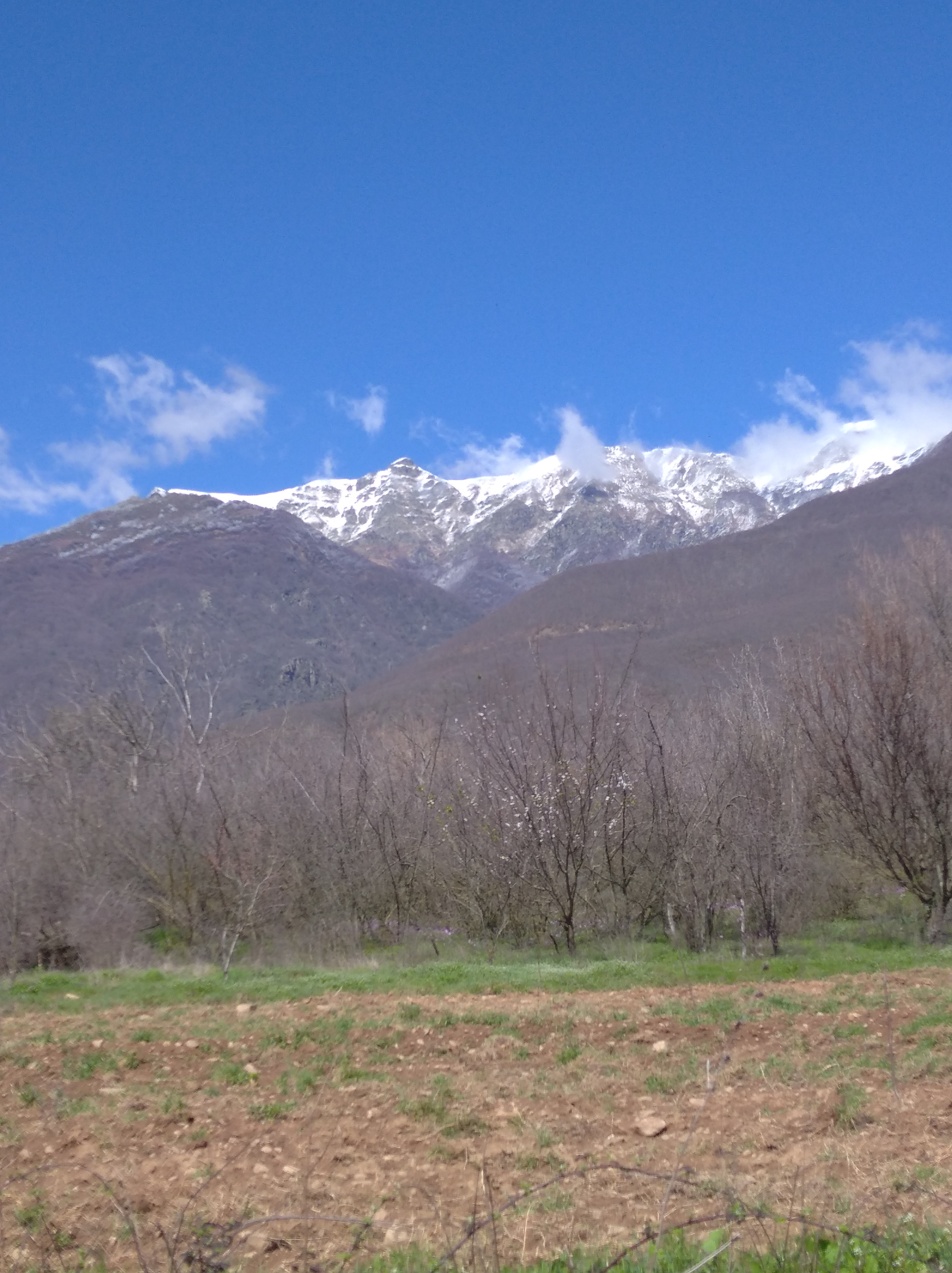
View of Belasica from the Greek side during the winter

== See also ==
- Belasitsa Nature Park
- Smolare Falls
