= Popluka =

Summit in Albania

- Maja e Poplukës
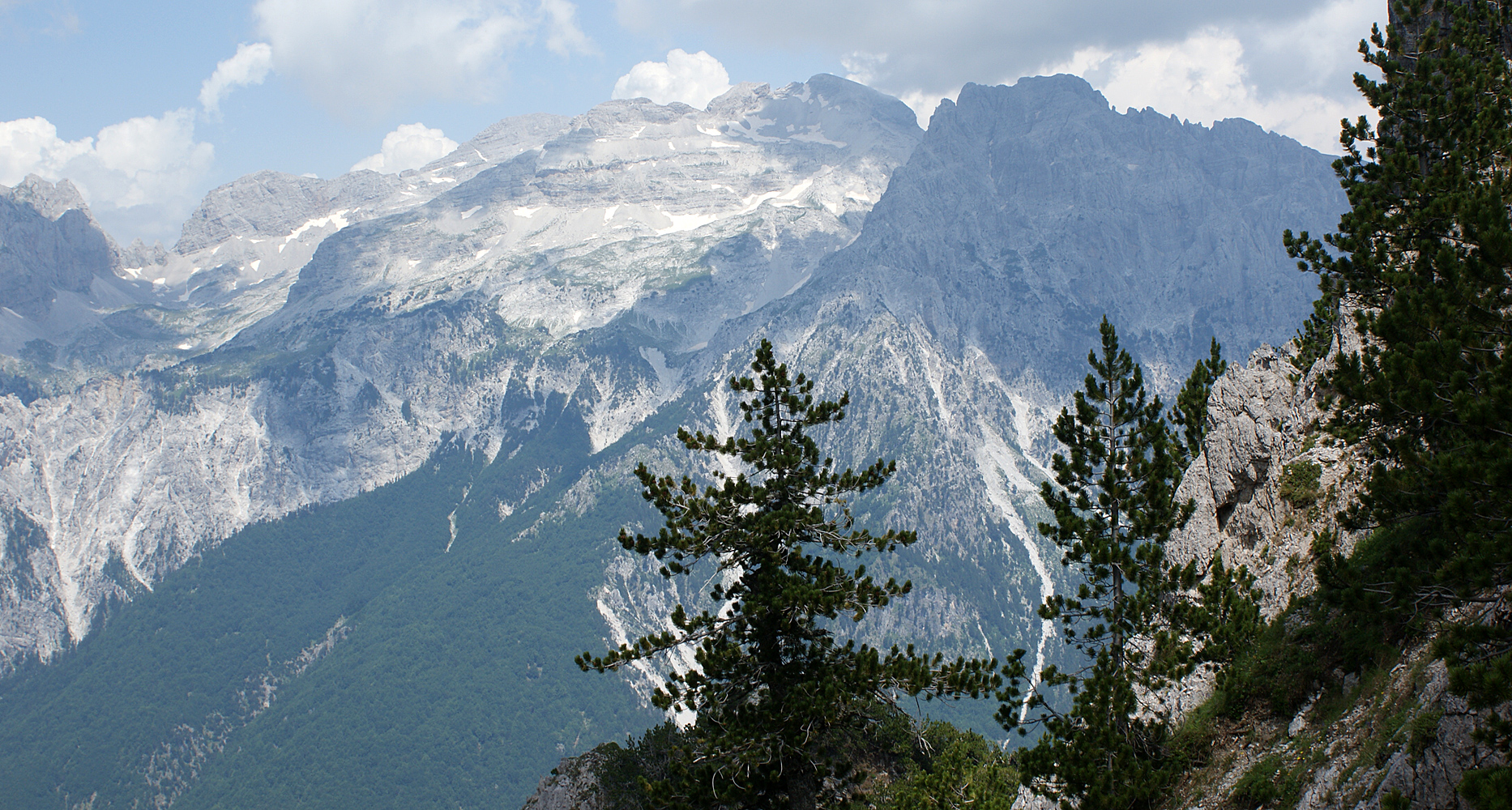
- Maja e Poplukës seen on the Jezerca massif

Highest point
- Elevation: 2,569 m (8,428 ft)
- Prominence: 171 m (561 ft)
- Isolation: 1.7 km (1.1 mi)
- Coordinates: 42°25′44″N 19°48′04″E

Naming
- Nickname: Maja "8 Marsi"

Geography
- Location within Albania
- Country: Albania
- Region: Albanian Alps
- Municipality: Tropojë
- Parent range: Accursed Mountains

Geology
- Rock age: Mesozoic
- Mountain type: summit
- Rock type: limestone

Popluka is a summit in the Accursed Mountains of northern Albania. Rising to an elevation of 2,569 m (8,428 ft) above sea level, it ranks as the 5th-highest peak in the range.

Located approximately 2 km south of Jezercë, the peak is relatively inconspicuous when viewed from surrounding valleys and appears particularly prominent and steep when seen from Valbona Pass.

== Geology ==
Popluka lies within the rugged limestone massif of the Accursed Mountains, near the border region between Albania and Montenegro. This range is characterized by sharp ridges, glacial cirques, karst formations and deep valleys shaped by alpine tectonic movements and glaciation.

== Climbing route ==
The ascent to Popluka is typically made from Valbona Valley. The standard route follows the trail toward Gjelaj, continuing to the first source of the Valbona River. From there, climbers proceed through Lugu i Valit to a mountain pass, where a rightward ascent leads to the summit.

The full hike generally takes about nine hours round trip, with an elevation gain of approximately 1,700 meters (5,577 ft).

== See also ==
- List of mountains in Albania
