= Maja e Bojës =

Summit in Albania

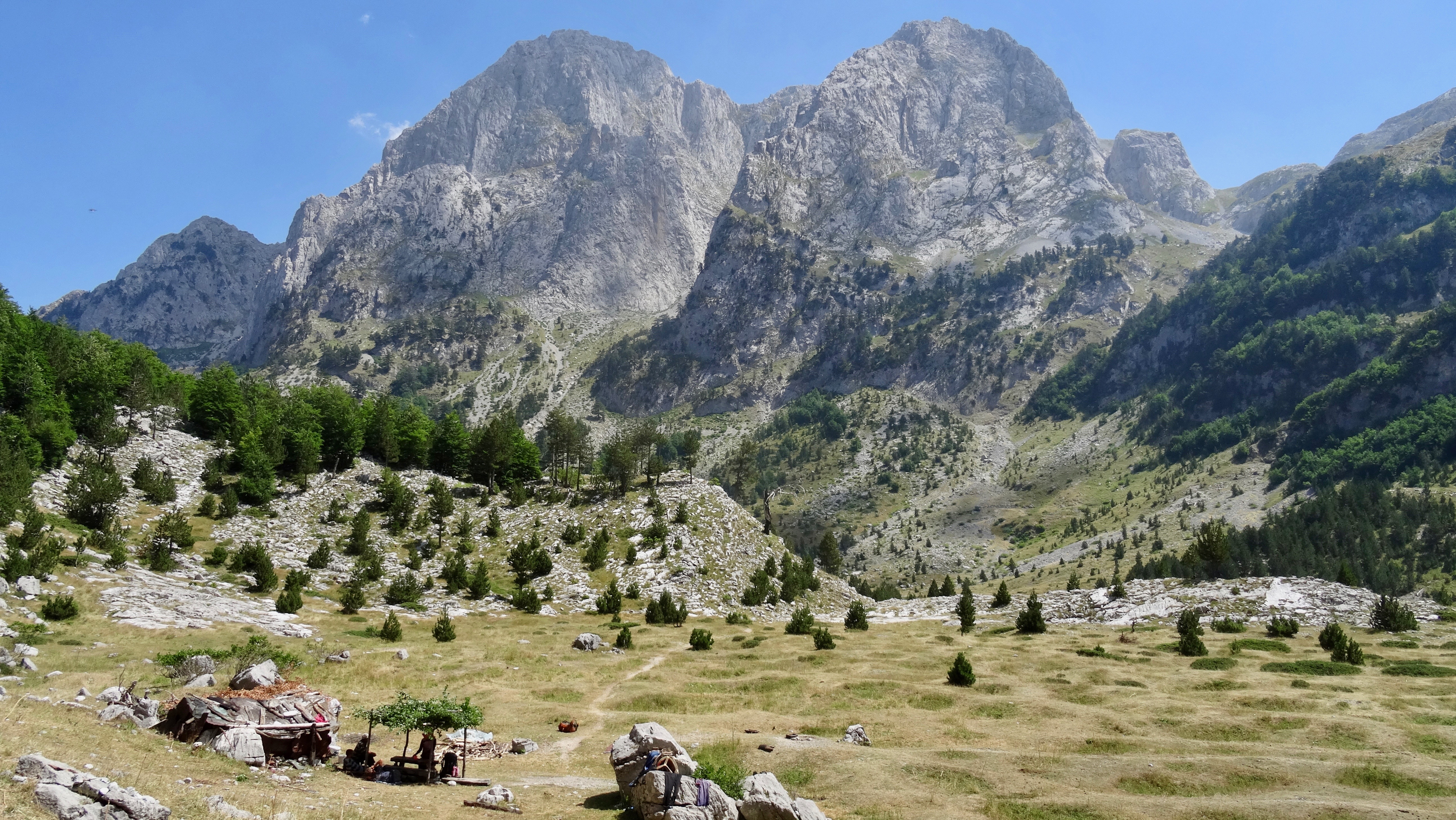
- Maja e Bojës (right) standing opposite Maja e Çokishtes

Highest point
- Elevation: 2,461 m (8,074 ft)
- Prominence: 352 m (1,155 ft)
- Isolation: 2.2 km (1.4 mi)
- Coordinates: 42°27′57″N 19°47′57″E

Naming
- English translation: Colored Peak

Geography
- Location within Albania
- Country: Albania
- Region: Albanian Alps
- Municipality: Tropojë
- Parent range: Accursed Mountains

Geology
- Rock age: Pleistocene
- Mountain type: summit
- Rock type: limestone

Maja e Bojës (lit. 'Colored Peak') is a summit located in the central part of the Accursed Mountains range, in northern Albania, close to the border with Montenegro. The peak rises to approximately 2,461 m (8,074 ft) above sea level and dominates the eastern side of the Buni i Jezercës glacial valley.

== Geography ==
Maja e Bojës lies in the heart of the Accursed Mountains, one of the most rugged alpine regions of the Balkan Peninsula. It is situated northwest of Jezercë, the highest summit of the range and forms part of a compact cluster of high peaks surrounding the Buni i Jezercës valley.

The peak stands above steep glacial cirques and rocky ridges, with sharp elevation differences between valley floors and summits. To the northwest, the terrain descends toward the Ropojana valley and to the southeast it overlooks the Buni i Jezercës basin.

== Geology ==
The summit displays classic alpine landforms, including steep headwalls, narrow ridgelines and scree-covered slopes. The surrounding valleys were shaped by Pleistocene glaciers, which carved deep cirques and left behind a series of seasonal glacial lakes in the Buni i Jezercës valley. Rock faces are predominantly steep and broken, contributing to the summit’s dramatic appearance and its appeal among mountaineers.

== See also ==
- List of mountains in Albania
