= Mount Dyultydag =

Mountain in Russia

Gora Dyultydag
- Гора Дюльтыдаг
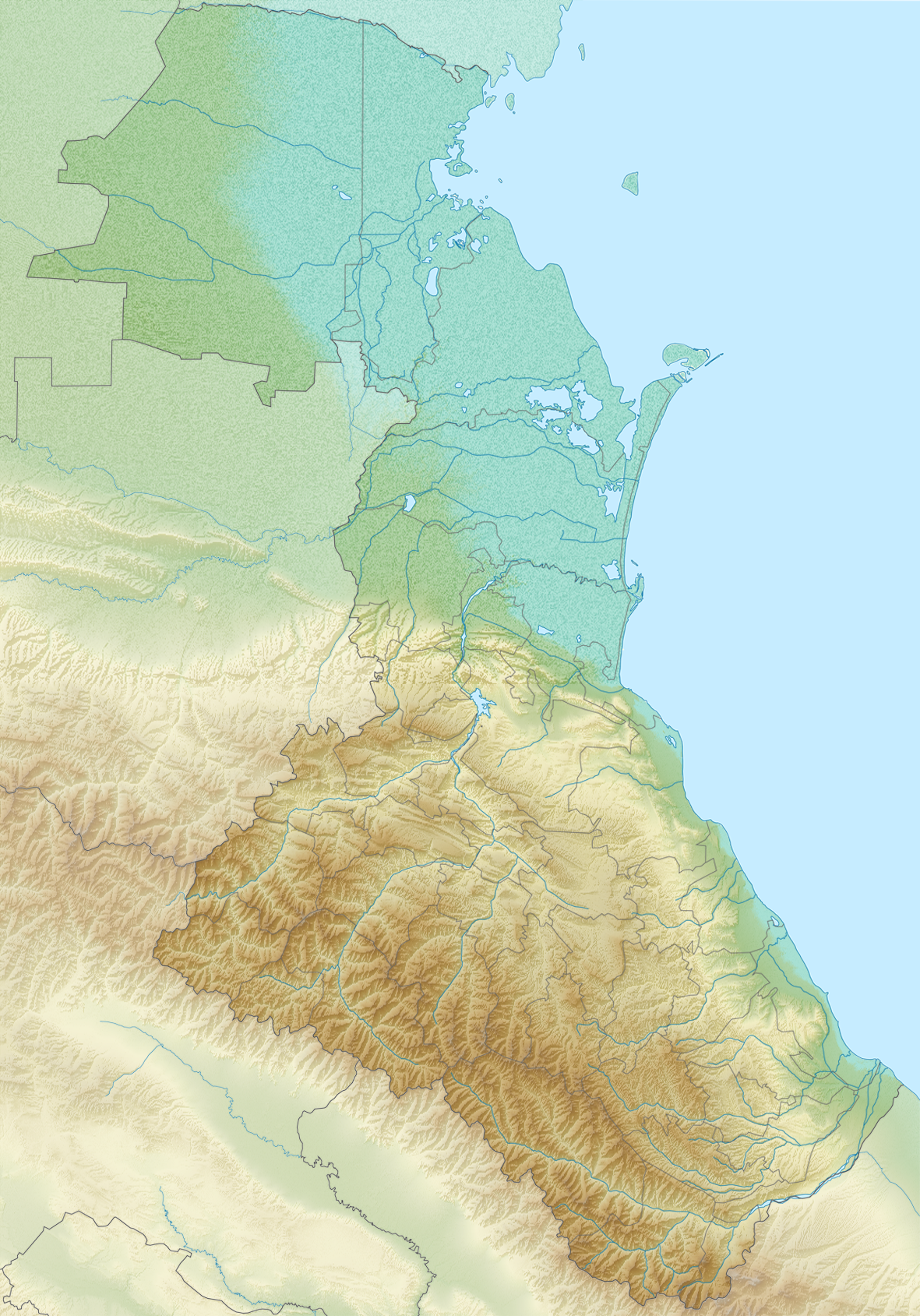
- Location within Caucasus Mountains Location within Republic of Dagestan

Highest point
- Elevation: 4,127 m (13,540 ft)
- Prominence: 1,834 m (6,017 ft)
- Isolation: 69.35 km (43.09 mi)
- Listing: Ultra, Ribu
- Coordinates: 41°57′34″N 46°55′20″E

Geography
- Location: Dagestan, Russia
- Country: Dagestan
- Parent range: Lateral Range; Caucasus Mountains

Gora Dyultydag, or simply Dyultydag (Russian: Дюльтыдаг), is a mountain located in Dagestan, Russia. At 4,127 m (13,540 ft) elevation, it is the highest point of the Dyultydag range of the Greater Caucasus.

== Toponymy ==
Dyultydag refers to both a mountain range and its higher summit, Gora Dyultydag.

Sometimes the Cyrillic name Дюльтыдаг is transliterated as Dyul'tydag.

== Geography ==
The mountain belongs to the Samur basin. Its peak stands about 15 km (9 mi) north of the border with Azerbaijan. The closest village to Dyultydag is Archib in Charodinsky District. In 1961 its summit was reported as perennial snow-capped. At an elevation of 4127 m Gora Dyultydag is Dagestan's fifth-highest mountain and the 45th-highest in Russia.

== See also ==
- List of European ultra prominent peaks
- List of ultras of West Asia
