= Këndrevica =

Summit in Albania

- Maja e Këndrevicës
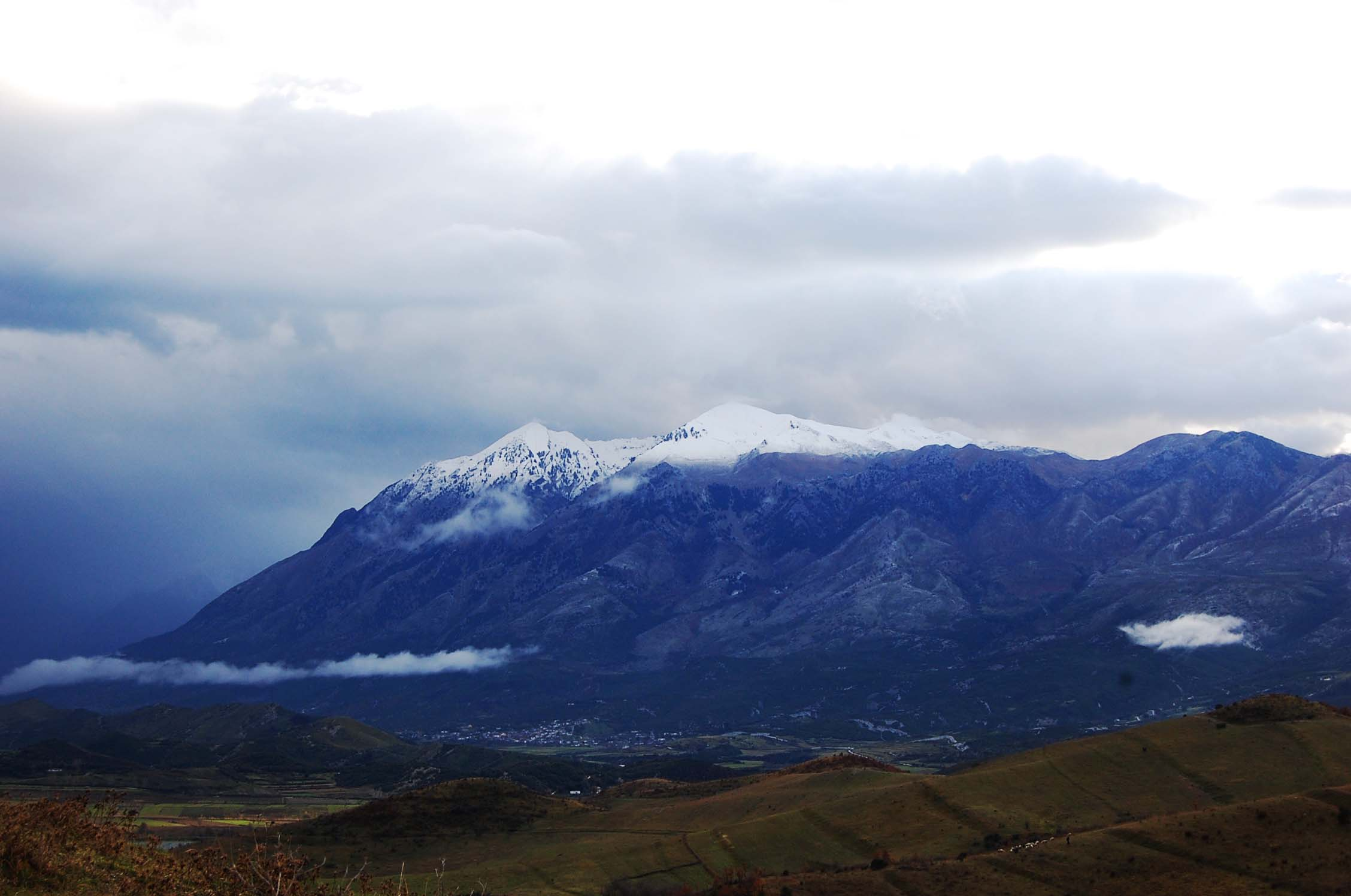
- A view of Këndrevica overlooking Shushica Valley

Highest point
- Elevation: 2,122 m (6,962 ft)
- Prominence: 1,662 m (5,453 ft)
- Isolation: 77.4 km (48.1 mi)
- Listing: Ultra, Ribu
- Coordinates: 40°17′11″N 19°50′59″E

Geography
- Location within Albania
- Country: Albania
- Region: Southern Mountain Region
- Municipality: Tepelenë
- Parent range: Kurvelesh Highlands

Geology
- Rock age(s): Mesozoic, Paleogene
- Mountain type: summit
- Rock type(s): limestone, flysch

Këndrevica is a summit in southern Albania, located approximately 15 kilometers west of Tepelenë. Rising to an elevation of 2,122 m (6,962 ft), it constitutes the highest peak of the Griba massif, in the Kurvelesh Highlands.

== Geology ==
The summit is composed entirely of Cretaceous limestone, characteristic of the Ionian geological zone. It features a pronounced pyramidal form, shaped by tectonic uplift and later modified by glacial processes.

Evidence of Quaternary glaciation is visible in three to four well-defined cirques carved into the eastern and northern slopes above 1,700 meters. These glacial depressions converge near the summit and are known locally as Gropa e Madhe and Gropa e Kondos.

The summit area is barren and arid. Intense karst development prevents the formation of surface watercourses, as rainfall quickly infiltrates through fissures and cavities in the limestone bedrock, causing the mountain to lack any permanent streams.

== Biodiversity ==
Despite the absence of forest vegetation, Këndrevica supports extensive alpine pastures in the summer season. During the hottest months, large numbers of small livestock (primarily sheep) are brought from different areas of southern Albania to graze on its high meadows.

== Climbing route ==
Këndrevica is accessible from multiple directions. One commonly used route approaches the mountain from the northeastern side, starting near the village of Nivicë. There, an asphalt road shortens the initial approach by approximately 4 kilometers before the ascent continues on foot.

The climb proceeds along steep slopes toward the peak of Kllogjri (1,967 m), after which the route follows a ridge with a more gradual incline leading to the summit.

The full hiking circuit is approximately 17 kilometers in length, with an elevation gain of about 1,300 meters. The round-trip hike typically requires around seven hours to complete, depending on pace and conditions.

== See also ==
- List of mountains in Albania
