= Griba =

Mountain in Albania

- Mali i Gribës
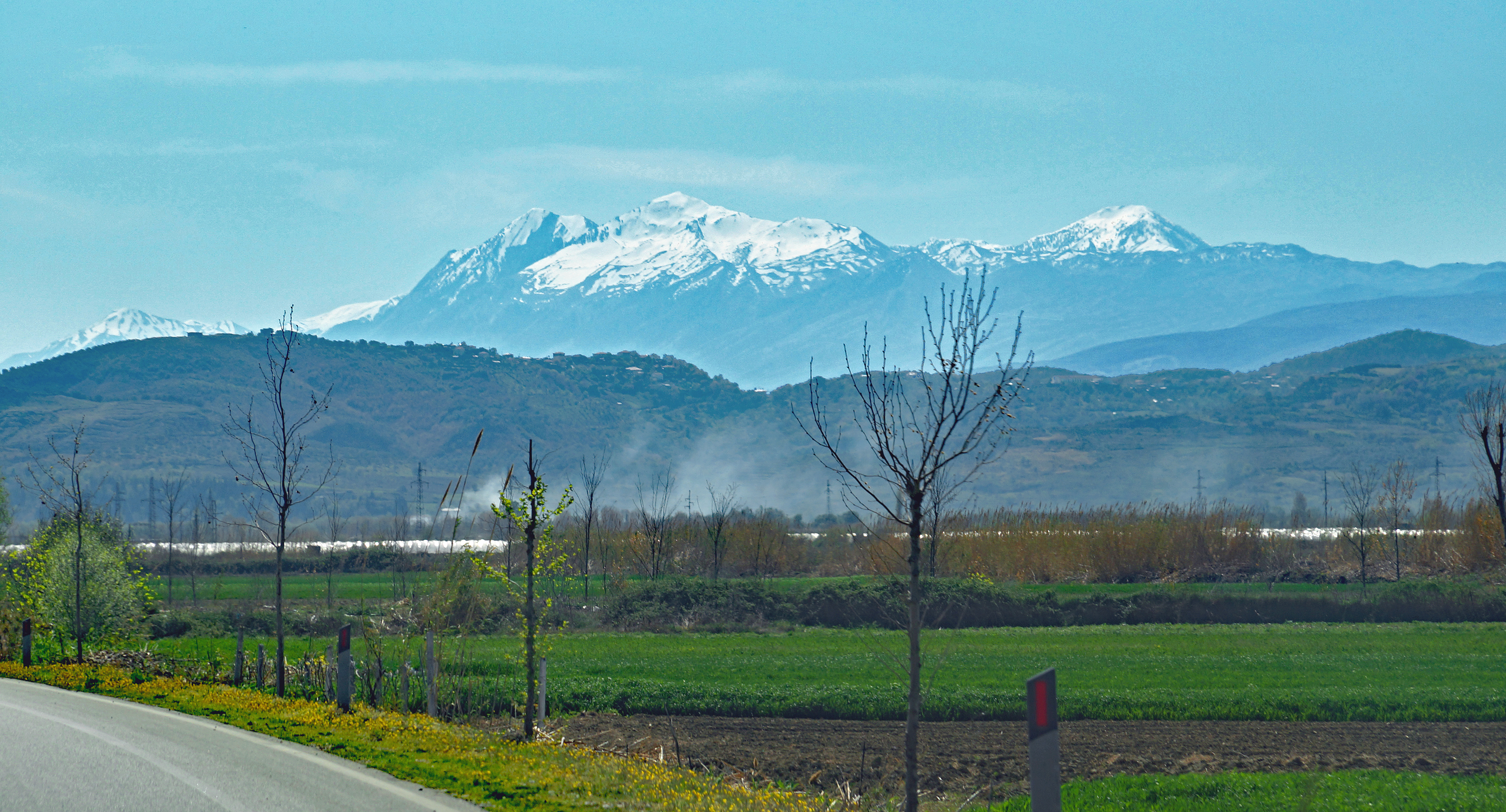
- Maja e Këndrevicës seem from Vjosa valley

Highest point
- Elevation: 2,122 m (6,962 ft)
- Prominence: 1,662 m (5,453 ft)
- Isolation: 77.4 km (48.1 mi)
- Coordinates: 40°17′11″N 19°50′59″E

Geography
- Location within Albania
- Country: Albania
- Region: Southern Mountain Region
- Municipality: Tepelenë
- Parent range: Kurvelesh Highlands

Geology
- Rock age(s): Mesozoic, Paleogene
- Mountain type: massif
- Rock type(s): limestone, flysch

Griba is a massif situated in the Upper Kurvelesh region, within the boundaries of Tepelenë municipality, in southern Albania. Its highest peak, Këndrevica, reaches a height of 2,122 m (6,962 ft).

Other high peaks include Maja e Tartarit 1,971 m (6,467 ft), Maja e Kulthit 1,907 m (6,257 ft), Maja e Sorrës 1,857 m (6,093 ft), Maja e Lopsit 1,837 m (6,027 ft), etc.

== Geology ==
The massif features a cone-shaped body with steep inclines and a flat peak and is composed primarily of Mesozoic and Paleogene limestones, with lesser amounts of flysch, giving it an asymmetrical anticlinal structure. Its ridge is marked by numerous karst pits and evidence of quaternary glaciations can be seen with the presence of cirques and moraines.

== Biodiversity ==
Vegetation is sparse but there are plenty of summer pastures and a variety of medicinal plants. In Dhëmblan, the laurel forest has been designated a protected nature reserve. The area is home to a thriving population of Rock Partridge.

== See also ==
- List of mountains in Albania
