= Addala-Shukhgelmeer =

Mountain in Russia

Gora Addala-Shukhgelmeer
- Аддала-Шухгельмеэр
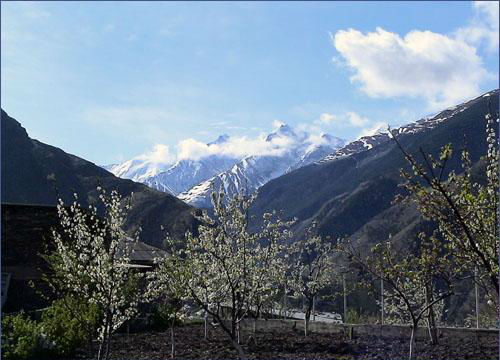

Highest point
- Elevation: 4,152 m (13,622 ft)
- Prominence: 1,792 m (5,879 ft)
- Isolation: 42.31 km (26.29 mi)
- Listing: Ultra, Ribu
- Coordinates: 42°20′18″N 46°15′00″E

Geography
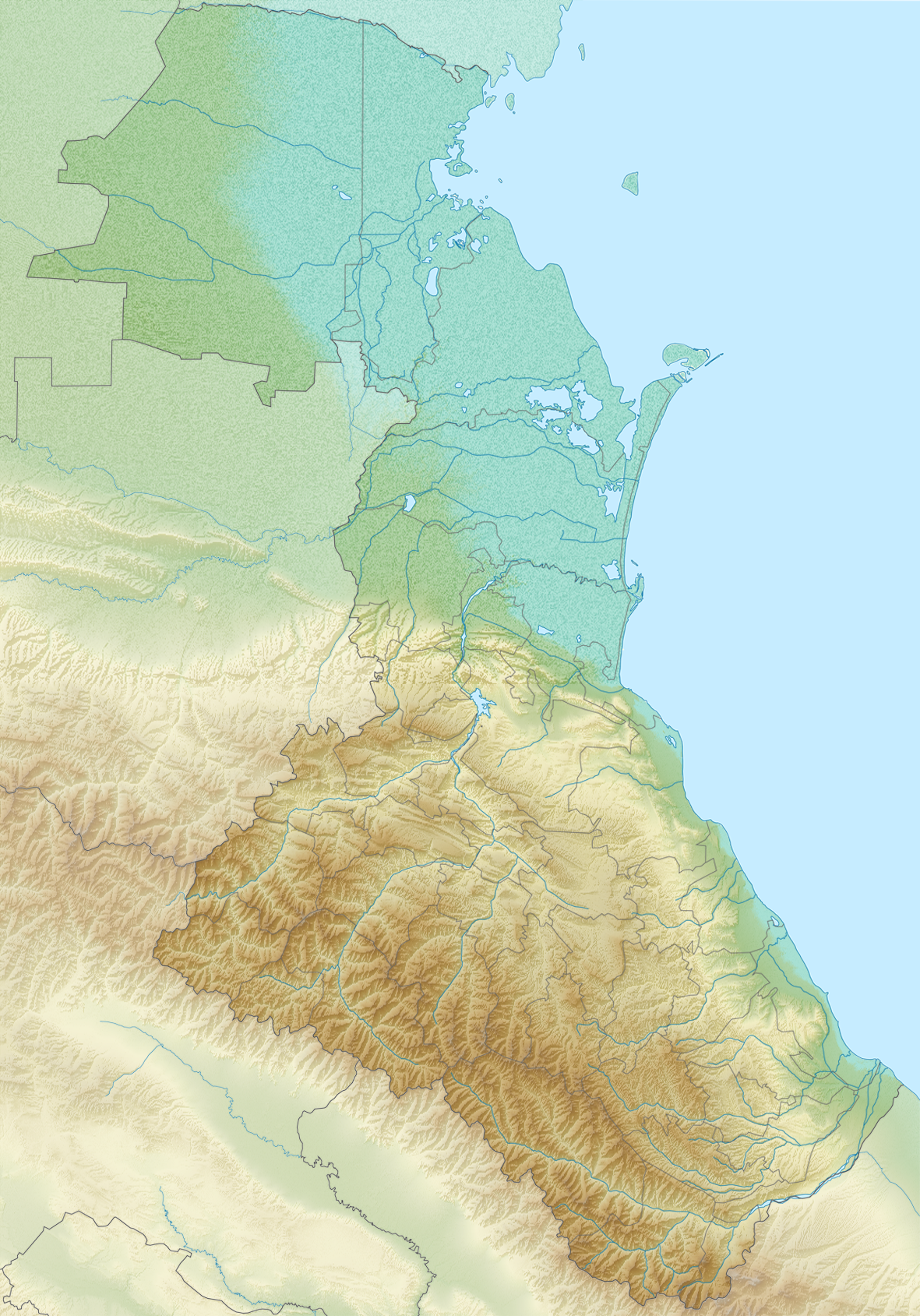
- Location within Caucasus Mountains Location within Republic of Dagestan
- Location: Dagestan, Russia
- Country: Dagestan
- Parent range: Caucasus Mountains

Addala-Shukhgelmeer (Russian: Аддала-Шухгельмеэр, romanized: Addala-Šuchgeljmeer) is a mountain in the Caucasus Mountains of Dagestan, Russia.

Under the mountain lies the mountain village of Aknada (Kizilyurt District). At an elevation of 4,152 m (13,622 ft) Addala-Shukhgelmeer is the 3rd highest mountain of Dagestan and the 40th highest in Russia.

== See also ==
- List of European Ultras
- List of ultras of West Asia
