= List of European ultra-prominent peaks =

This is a list of all the mountains in Europe with ultra-prominent peaks with topographic prominence greater than 1,500 metres or 4,900 feet.

== European peaks by prominence ==
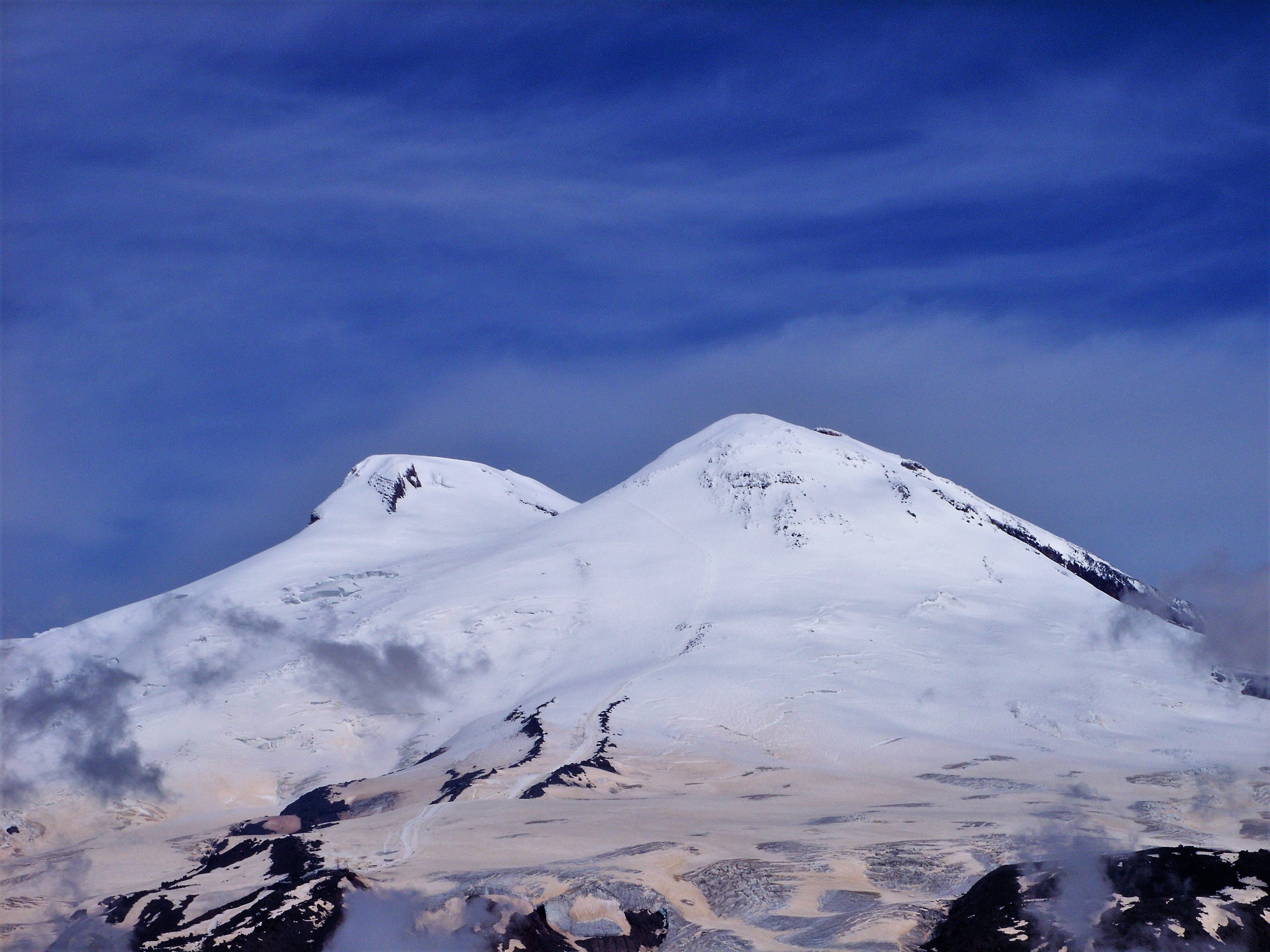
Mount Elbrus, highest mountain in Russia, and in Europe

The column "Col" in the chart below denotes the highest elevation to which one must descend from a peak in order to reach peaks with higher elevations; note that the elevation of any peak is the sum of its prominence and col.

No	Peak	Country	Elevation (m)	Prominence (m)	Col (m)
1	Mount Elbrus	Russia	5,642	4,741	901
2	Monte Bianco/ Mont Blanc	Italy/ France	4,810	4,697	113
3	Mount Etna	Italy (Sicily)	3,357	3,357	0
4	Mulhacén	Spain	3,479	3,285	194
5	Aneto	Spain	3,404	2,812	592
6	Monte Cinto	France (Corsica)	2,706	2,706	0
7	Corno Grande	Italy	2,912	2,476	436
8	Musala	Bulgaria	2,925	2,473	432
9	Mount Ida	Greece (Crete)	2,456	2,456	0
10	Grossglockner	Austria	3,798	2,423	1375

The above European Top 10 list excludes peaks on lands and islands that are part of European countries but are outside or on the limits of the European continent and its tectonic and geographic boundaries, like Teide (with prominence of 3,715 m, 12,188 ft), Tenerife Island, Spain; Belukha peak of the Altai Mountains in Russia (with prominence of 3,343 m, 10,968 ft); and Piton des Neiges (with prominence of 3,069 m, 10,069 ft), Réunion, France.

For ease of reference, the complete list below is divided into sections. Islands in the Atlantic, like Azores and Iceland, the Arctic archipelagos of Jan Mayen, Svalbard, and Novaya Zemlya, Mediterranean Sicily and the other Mediterranean islands, territories of European countries, have also been included as sections (with the exception of Greenland), and are taken into account for the Top 10 List, although being somehow on the European boundaries. Mount Etna active volcano is somehow on, or just outside the boundaries of the Eurasian Plate, resting on the subduction boundary where the African tectonic plate is being pushed under the Eurasian plate, but geographically is part of Europe, and is also included in the Top 10 list.

The sections include peaks on the African Plate, the Canary Islands and Madeira, and some peaks on or just outside the European boundaries located in the Caucasus Mountains (European Russia and the Caucasus states) and the Ural Mountains, both forming the geographic boundaries between the Europe and Asia, but those last mentioned aren't included in the Top 10 List. Mount Narodnaya, the highest peak in the Ural Mountains, is on the main watershed ridge, so on the limits of Europe, and cannot be considered a strictly European mountain and peak. Mount Elbrus is a dormant stratovolcano, forming part of the Caucasus Mountains, and geographically it is laying entirely in Europe and Russia, 20 km (12 mi) north of the main ridge and watershed of the Greater Caucasus, considered as the one that is forming the limits of Europe, that also forms great part of the length of the border between Russia and Georgia. Mount Bazardüzü, also in the Caucasus, has a prominence of 2,454 metres (8,051 ft), but is located on the boundary between Europe and Asia, on the border between Russia and Azerbaijan, so it cannot be considered a strictly European mountain and peak.

== Alps ==
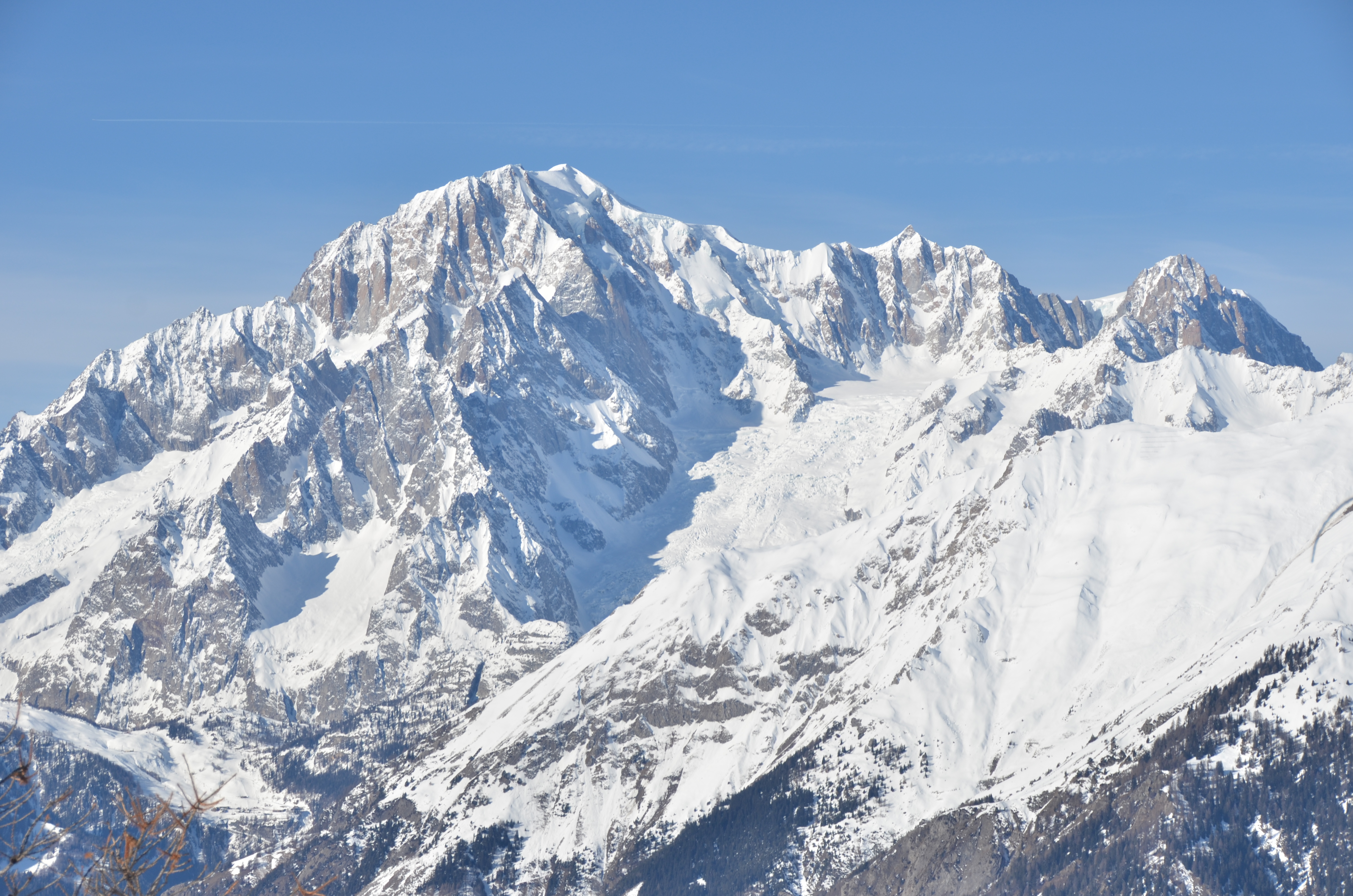
Mont Blanc, France/Italy

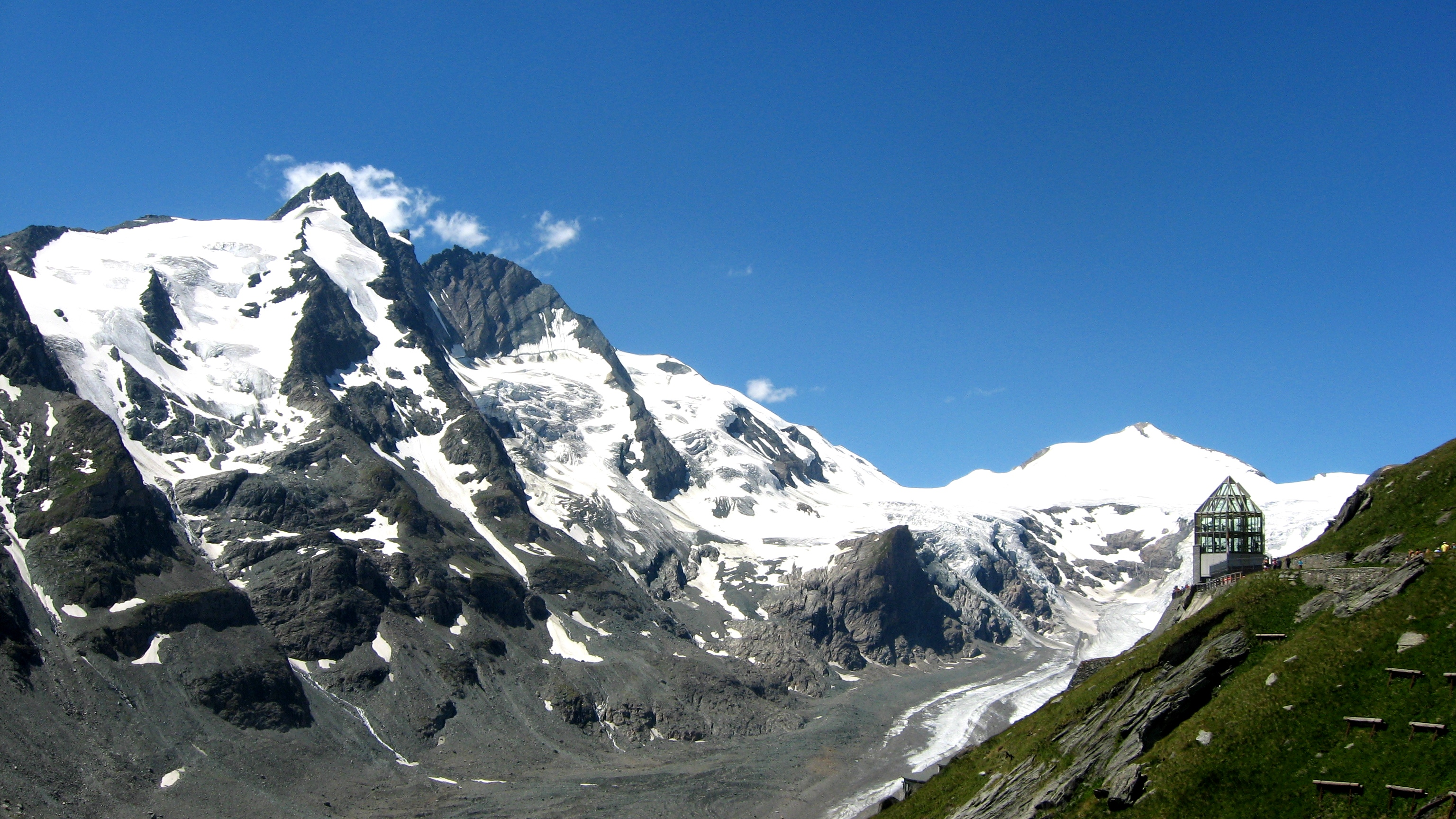
Großglockner, Austria

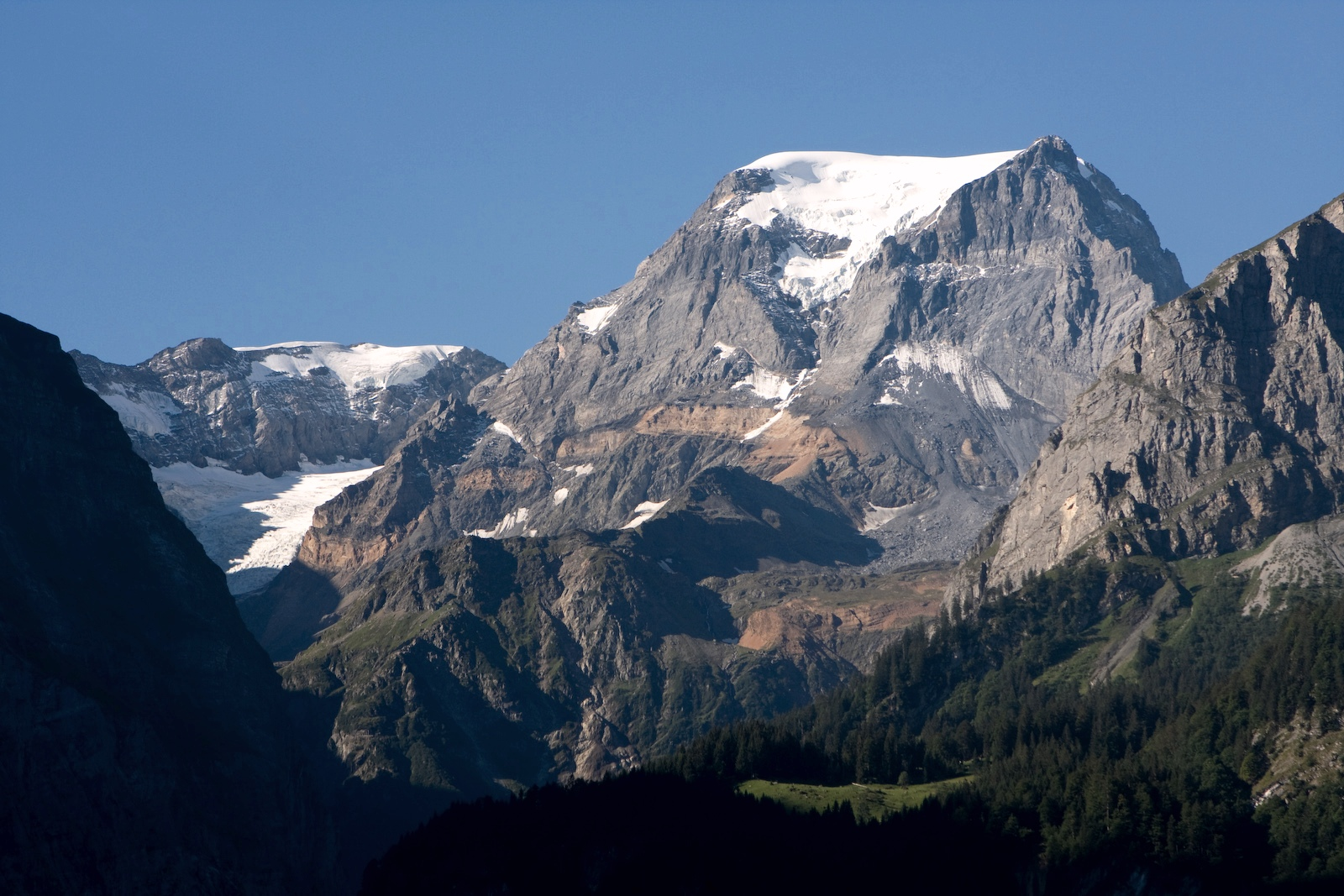
Tödi, Switzerland

No	Peak	Country	Elevation (m)	Prominence (m)	Col height (m)
1	Mont Blanc	France / Italy	4,810	4,697	113
2	Großglockner	Austria	3,798	2,423	1375
3	Finsteraarhorn	Switzerland	4,274	2,279	1995
4	Wildspitze	Austria	3,768	2,261	1507
5	Piz Bernina	Switzerland	4,048	2,236	1812
6	Hochkönig	Austria	2,941	2,181	760
7	Dufourspitze (Monte Rosa)	Switzerland / Italy	4,634	2,165	2469
8	Hoher Dachstein	Austria	2,995	2,136	859
9	Marmolada	Italy	3,343	2,131	1212
10	Monte Viso	Italy	3,841	2,062	1779
11	Triglav	Slovenia	2,864	2,052	812
12	Barre des Écrins	France	4,102	2,045	2057
13	Säntis	Switzerland	2,503	2,021	482
14	Ortler	Italy	3,905	1,953	1952
15	Monte Baldo/Cima Valdritta	Italy	2,218	1,950	268
16	Gran Paradiso	Italy	4,061	1,891	2170
17	Pizzo di Coca	Italy	3,050	1,878	1172
18	Cima Dodici	Italy	2,336	1,874	462
19	Dents du Midi	Switzerland	3,257	1,796	1461
20	Chamechaude	France	2,082	1,771	311
21	Zugspitze	Germany / Austria	2,962	1,746	1216
22	Monte Antelao	Italy	3,264	1,735	1529
23	Arcalod	France	2,217	1,713	504
24	Grintovec	Slovenia	2,558	1,706	852
25	Großer Priel	Austria	2,515	1,700	810
26	Grigna Settentrionale	Italy	2,409	1,686	723
27	Monte Bondone	Italy	2,180	1,679	501
28	Presanella	Italy	3,558	1,676	1882
29	Birnhorn	Austria	2,634	1,665	969
30	Col Nudo	Italy	2,471	1,644	827
31	Pointe Percée	France	2,750	1,643	1107
32	Jôf di Montasio	Italy	2,753	1,597	1156
33	Mölltaler Polinik	Austria	2,784	1,579	1205
34	Tödi	Switzerland	3,614	1,570	2044
35	Birkkarspitze	Austria	2,749	1,564	1185
36	Ellmauer Halt	Austria	2,344	1,551	793
37	Grande Tête de l'Obiou	France	2,790	1,542	1248
38	Hochtor	Austria	2,369	1,520	849
39	Grimming	Austria	2,351	1,518	833
40	Grand Combin	Switzerland	4,309	1,512	2797
41	La Tournette	France	2,351	1,514	837
42	Zirbitzkogel	Austria	2,396	1,502	894
43	Piz Kesch	Switzerland	3,418	1,502	1916
44	Cima Brenta	Italy	3,151	1,501	1650

== Apennines, Italian peninsula and neighbouring islands ==
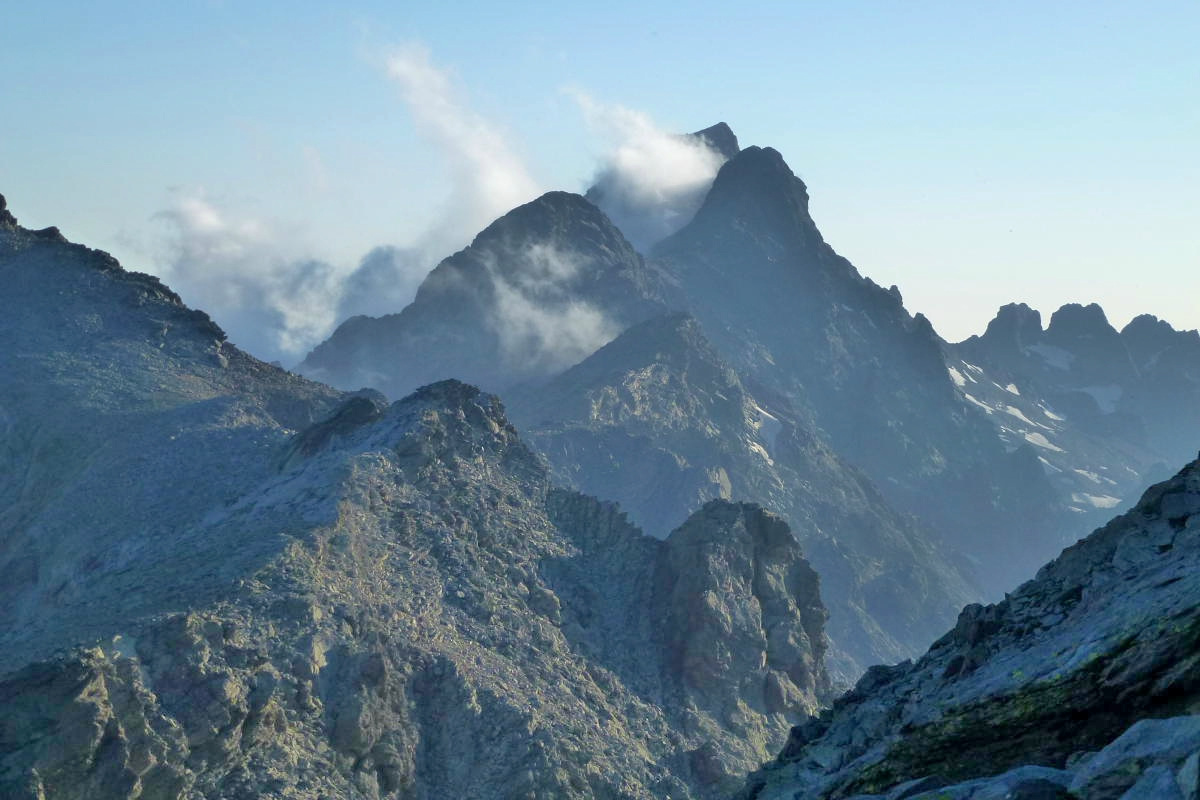
Monte Cinto, Corsica

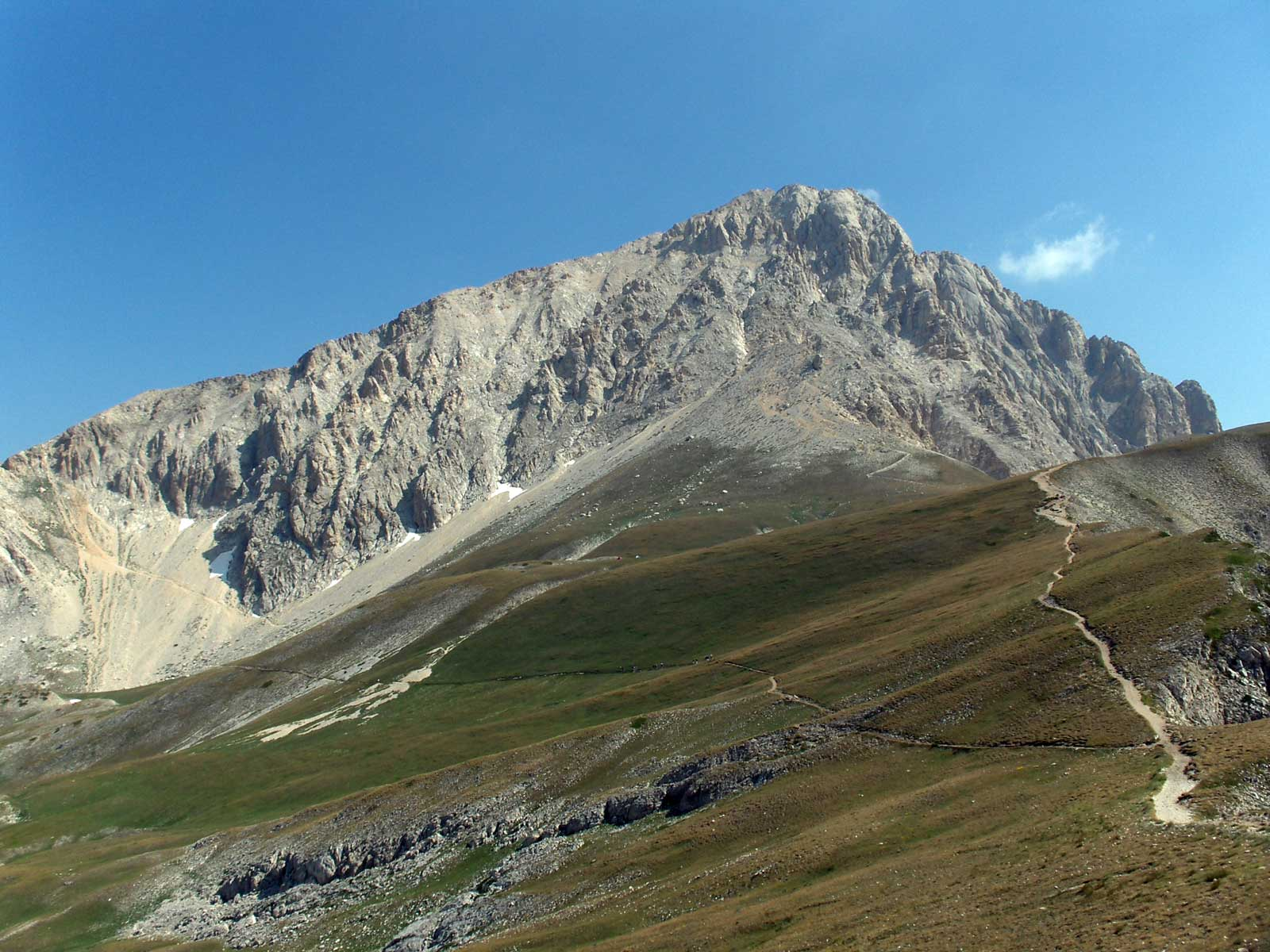
Corno Grande, Italy

No	Peak	Country	Elevation (m)	Prominence (m)	Col (m)
1	Mount Etna	Italy (Sicily)	3,357	3,357	0
2	Monte Cinto	France (Corsica)	2,706	2,706	0
3	Corno Grande	Italy	2,912	2,476	436
4	Punta La Marmora	Italy (Sardinia)	1,834	1,834	0
5	Monte Amaro	Italy	2,795	1,812	983
6	Monte Dolcedorme	Italy	2,267	1,715	552
7	Montalto	Italy	1,955	1,709	246
8	Monte Cimone	Italy	2,165	1,577	588

== Arctic islands ==
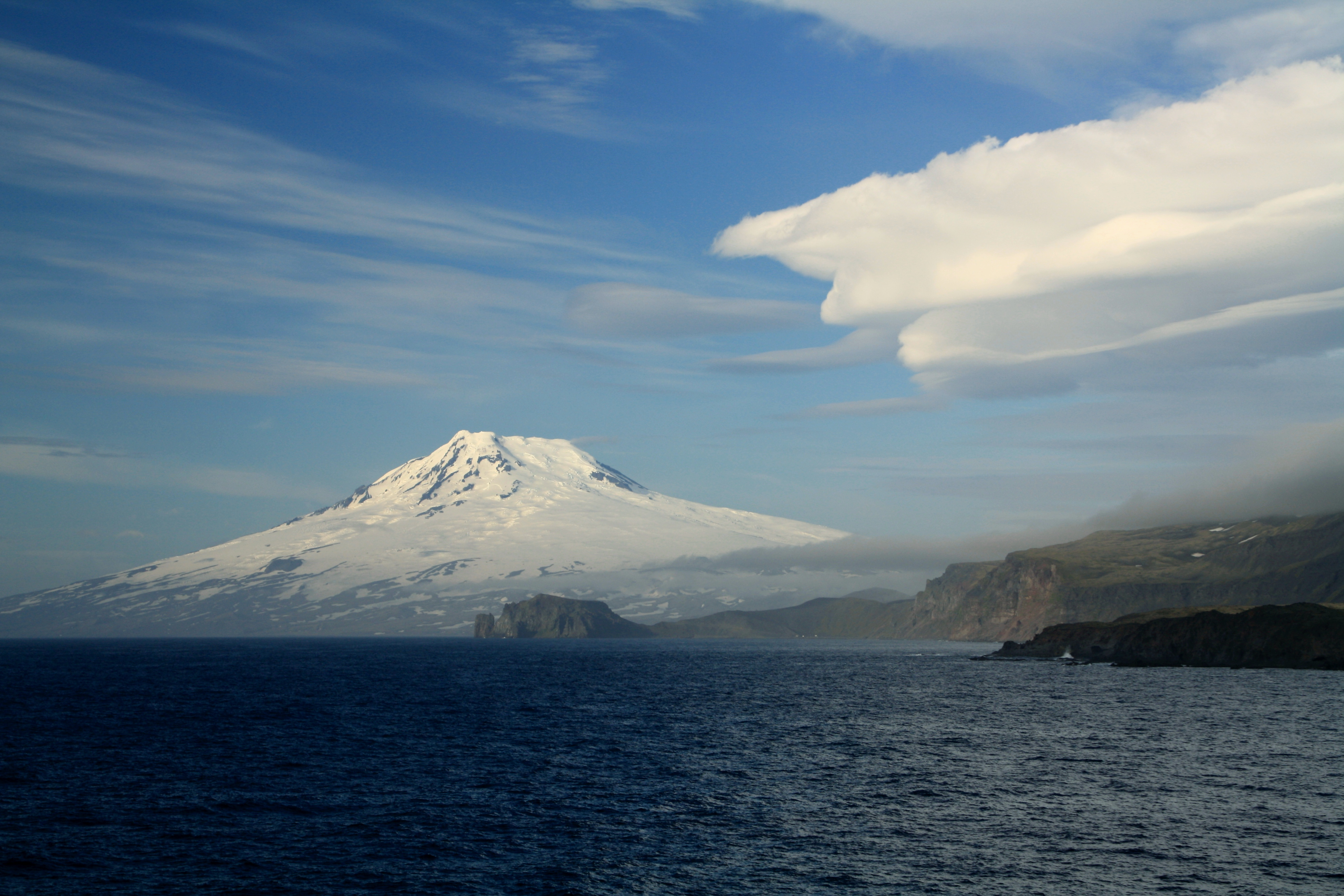
Beerenberg, Norway

No	Peak	Country	Elevation (m)	Prominence (m)	Col (m)
1	Beerenberg	Norway (Jan Mayen)	2,277	2,277	0
2	Newtontoppen	Norway (Svalbard)	1,717	1,717	0
3	Mount Kruzenshtern	Russia (Novaya Zemlya)	1,549	1,549	0

== Atlantic islands ==
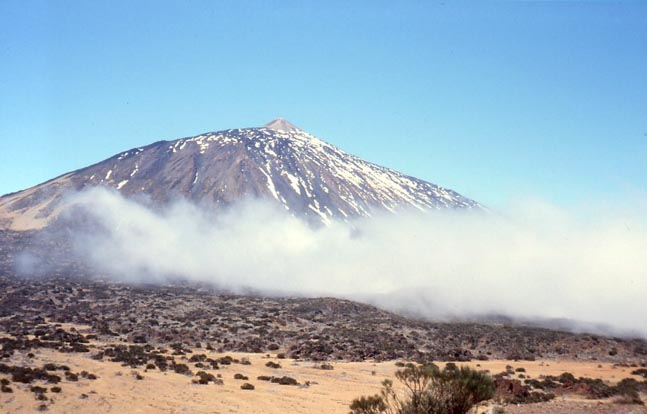
Teide, Canary Islands (Spain)

No	Peak	Country	Elevation (m)	Prominence (m)	Col (m)
1	Teide	Spain (Canaries)	3,715	3,715	0
2	Roque de los Muchachos	Spain (Canaries)	2,423	2,423	0
3	Mount Pico	Portugal (Azores)	2,351	2,351	0
4	Hvannadalshnúkur	Iceland	2,110	2,110	0
5	Pico de las Nieves	Spain (Canaries)	1,949	1,949	0
6	Pico Ruivo	Portugal (Madeira)	1,861	1,861	0
7	Pico de Malpaso	Spain (Canaries)	1,501	1,501	0

== Southeast Europe ==
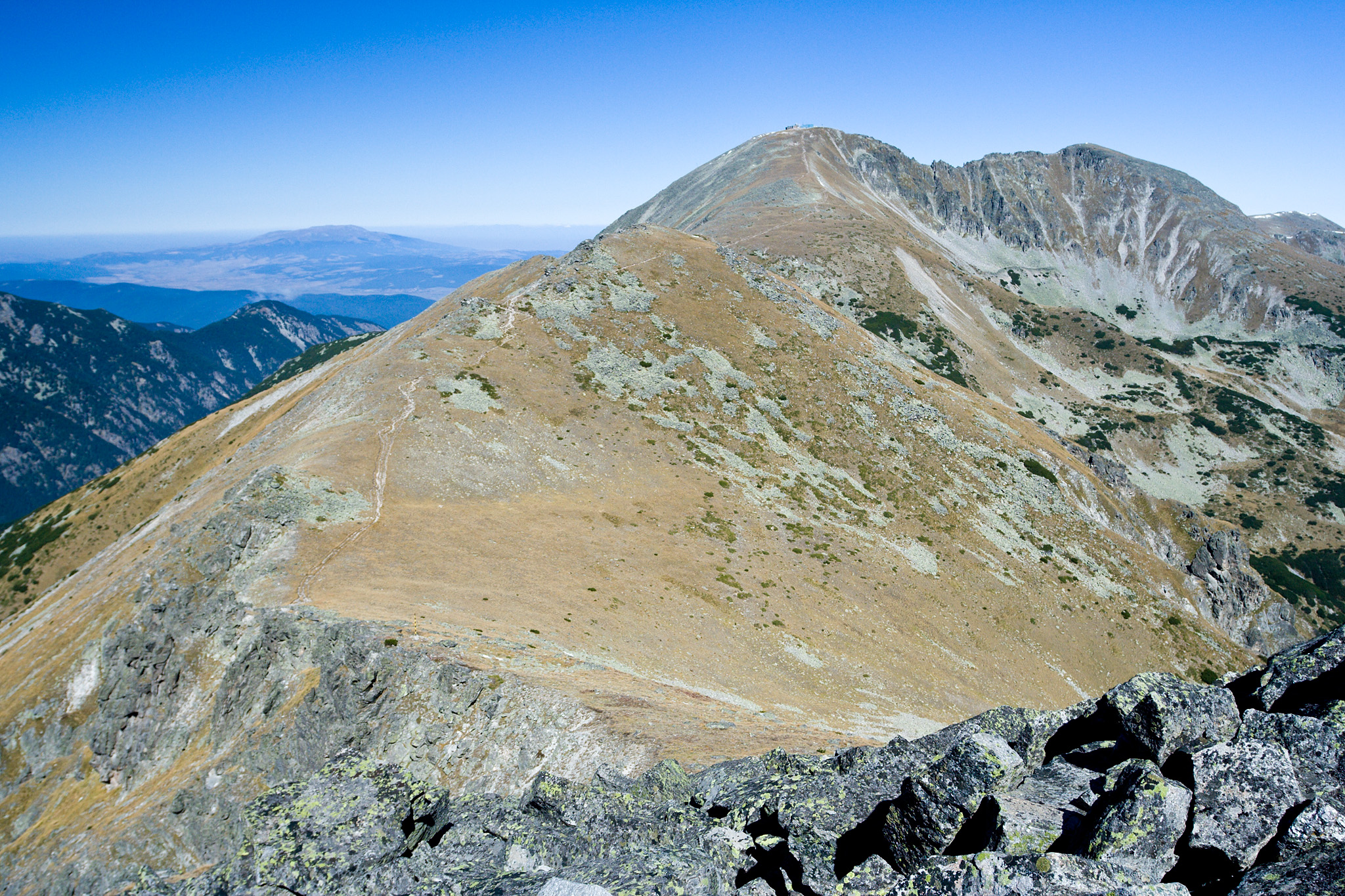
Musala, Bulgaria

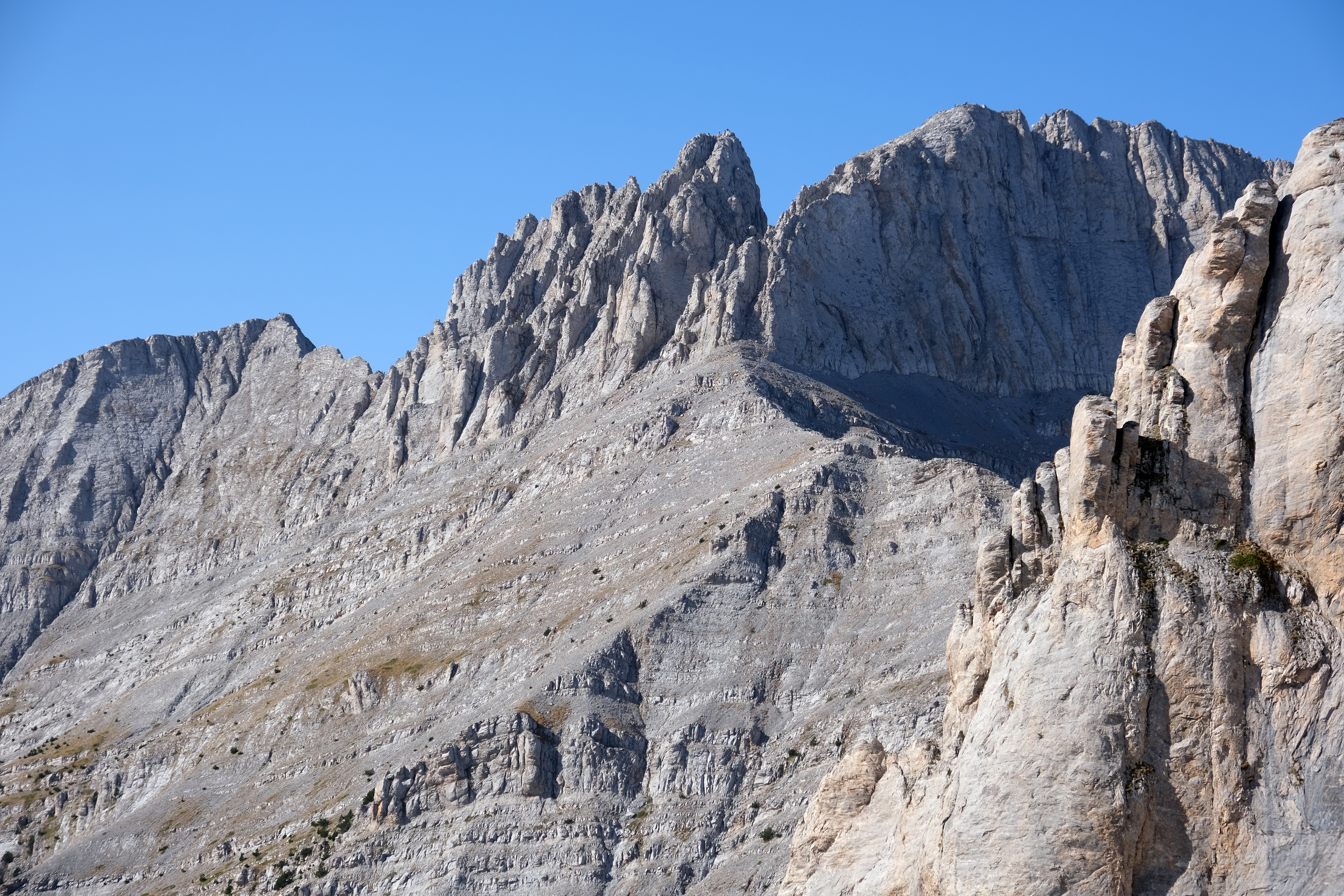
Mount Olympus, Greece

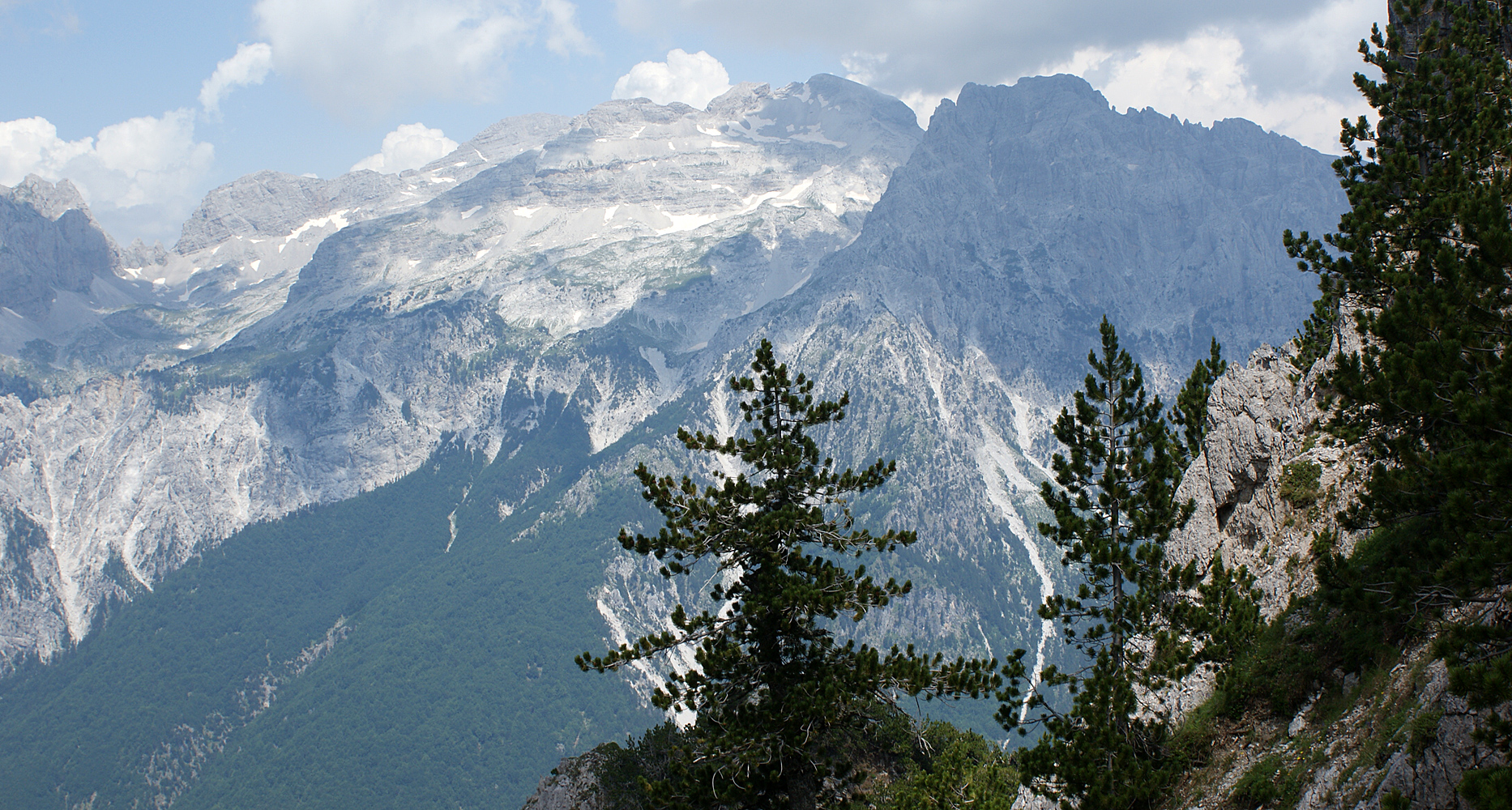
Maja e Jezercës, Albania

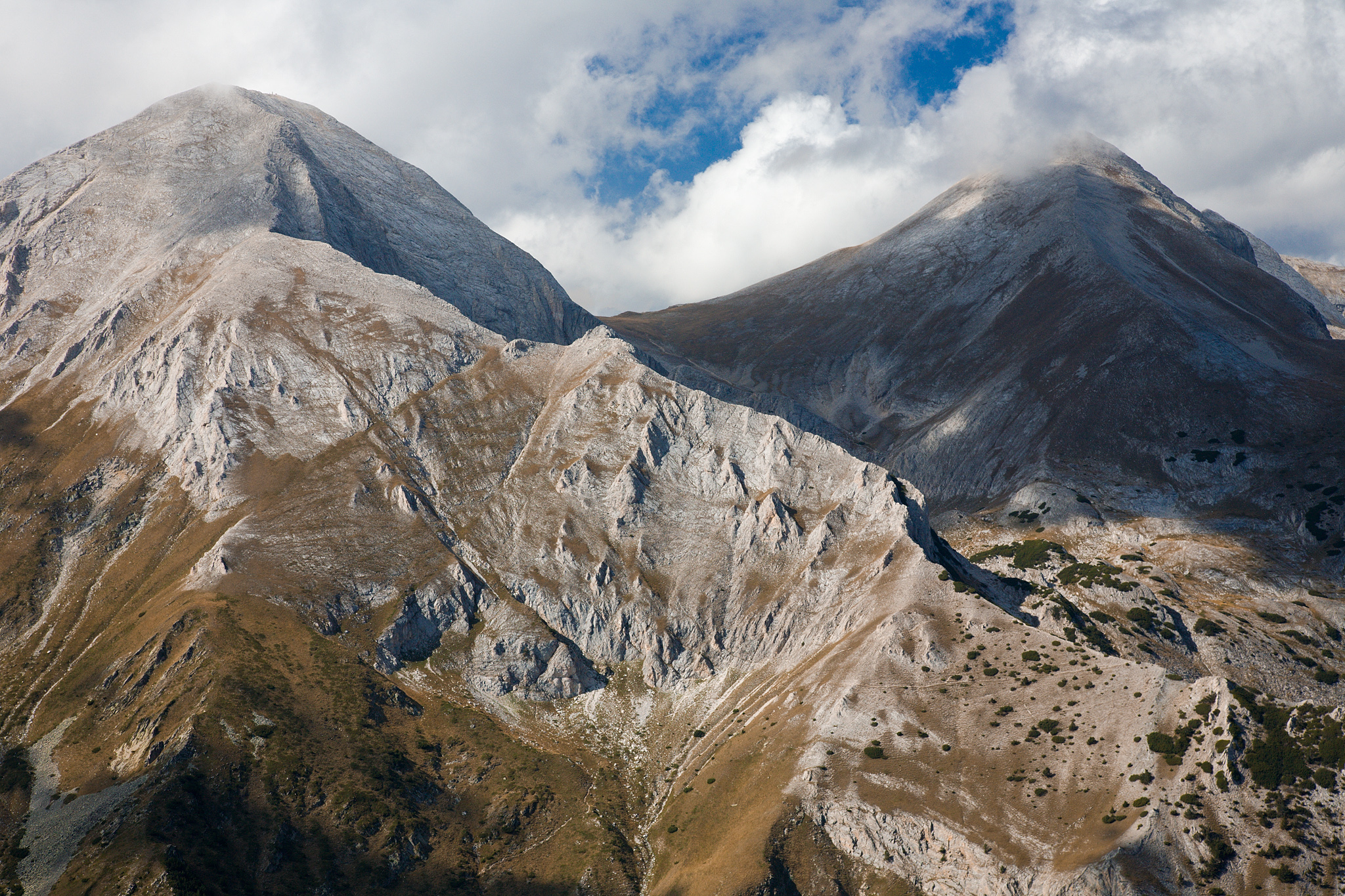
Vihren, Pirin Mountain, Bulgaria

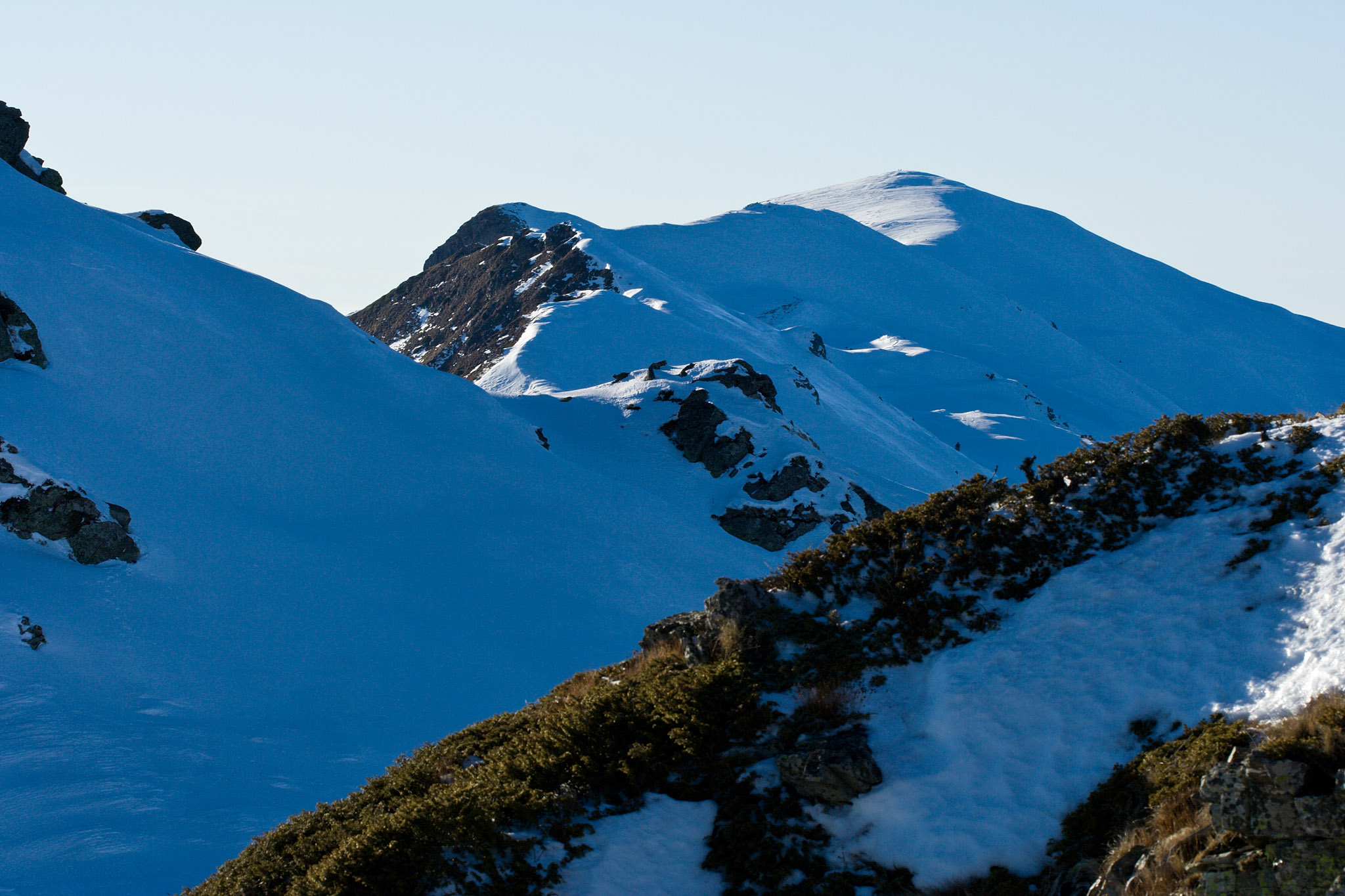
Radomir/Kalabak/Kerkini, Belasitsa, Bulgaria and Greece

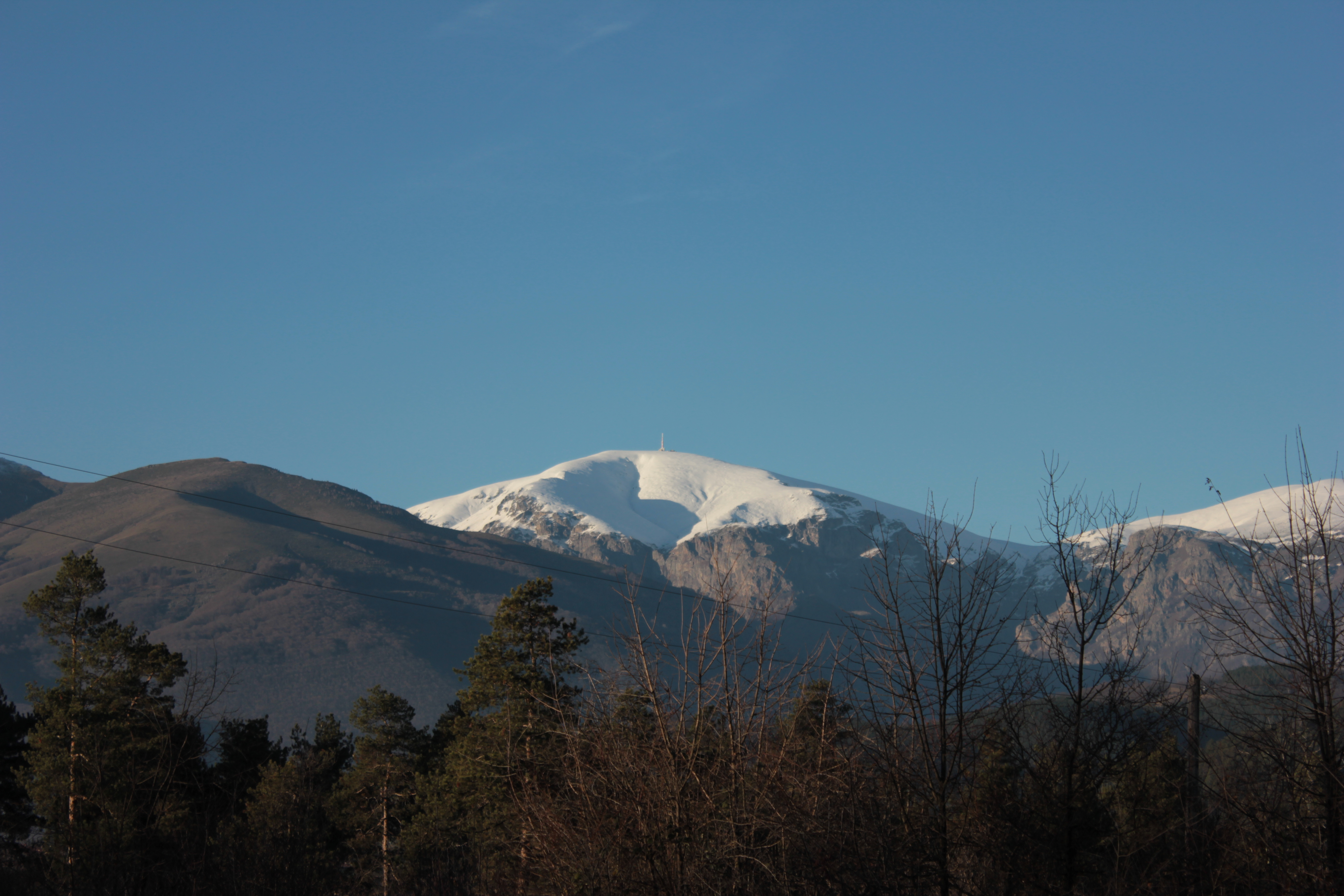
View of Botev Peak from I-6 road (Bulgaria)

No	Peak	Country	Elevation (m)	Prominence (m)	Col (m)
1	Musala	Bulgaria	2,925	2,473	452
2	Mount Olympus (Mytikas)	Greece	2,917	2,353	564
3	Korab	Albania /North Macedonia	2,764	2,169	595
5	Jezercë	Albania	2,694	2,036	658
6	Mount Athos	Greece	2,030	2,012	18
7	Mount Ossa	Greece	1,978	1,854	124
8	Papingu	Albania	2,482	1,792	690
9	Vihren	Bulgaria	2,914	1,783	1131
10	Pangaion Hills	Greece	1,956	1,773	183
11	Kajmakchalan	North Macedonia /Greece	2,528	1,758	770
12	Smolikas	Greece	2,637	1,736	901
13	Mount Giona	Greece	2,510	1,702	808
14	Jakupica	North Macedonia	2,540	1,666	874
15	Këndrevica	Albania	2,121	1,666	455
16	Radomir	Bulgaria / Greece	2,031	1,595	436
17	Mount Parnassus	Greece	2,457	1,590	867
18	Botev Peak	Bulgaria	2,376	1,567	809
19	Çikë	Albania	2,044	1,563	481
20	Valamara	Albania	2,373	1,526	847
21	Pelister	North Macedonia	2,601	1,516	1085
22	Psili Koryfi	Greece	1,589	1,514	75

== Carpathian Mountains ==
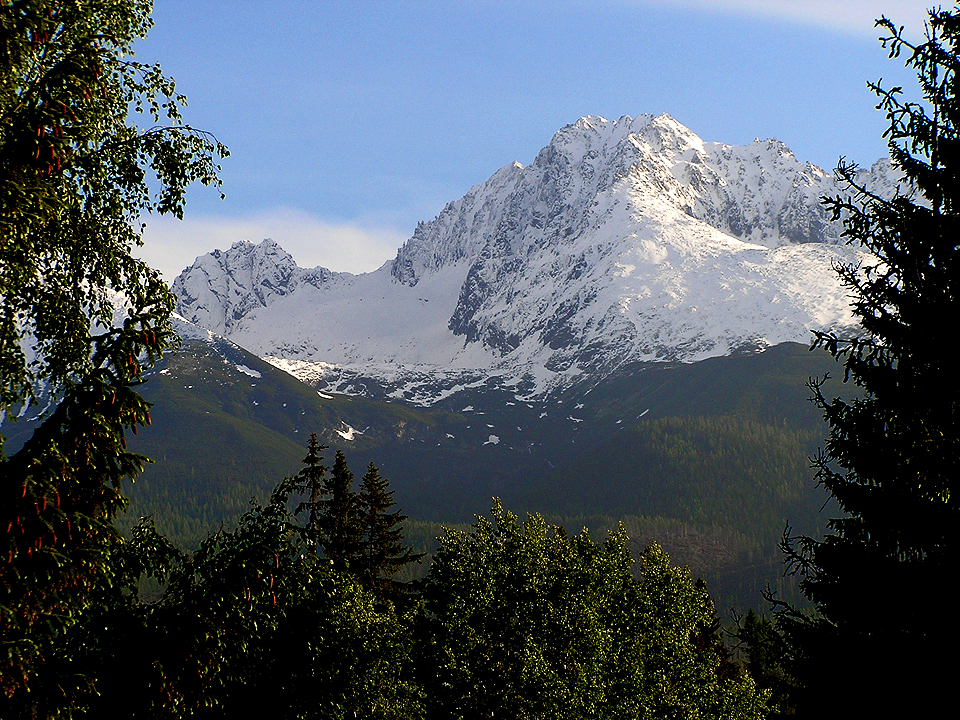
Gerlachovský štít, Slovakia

No	Peak	Country	Elevation (m)	Prominence (m)	Col (m)
1	Gerlachovský štít	Slovakia	2,655	2,356	300
2	Parângu Mare	Romania	2,519	2,103	416
3	Moldoveanu Peak	Romania	2,544	2,046	498
4	Peleaga	Romania	2,509	1,759	750
5	Pietrosul Rodnei	Romania	2,303	1,565	738

== Caucasus Mountains ==
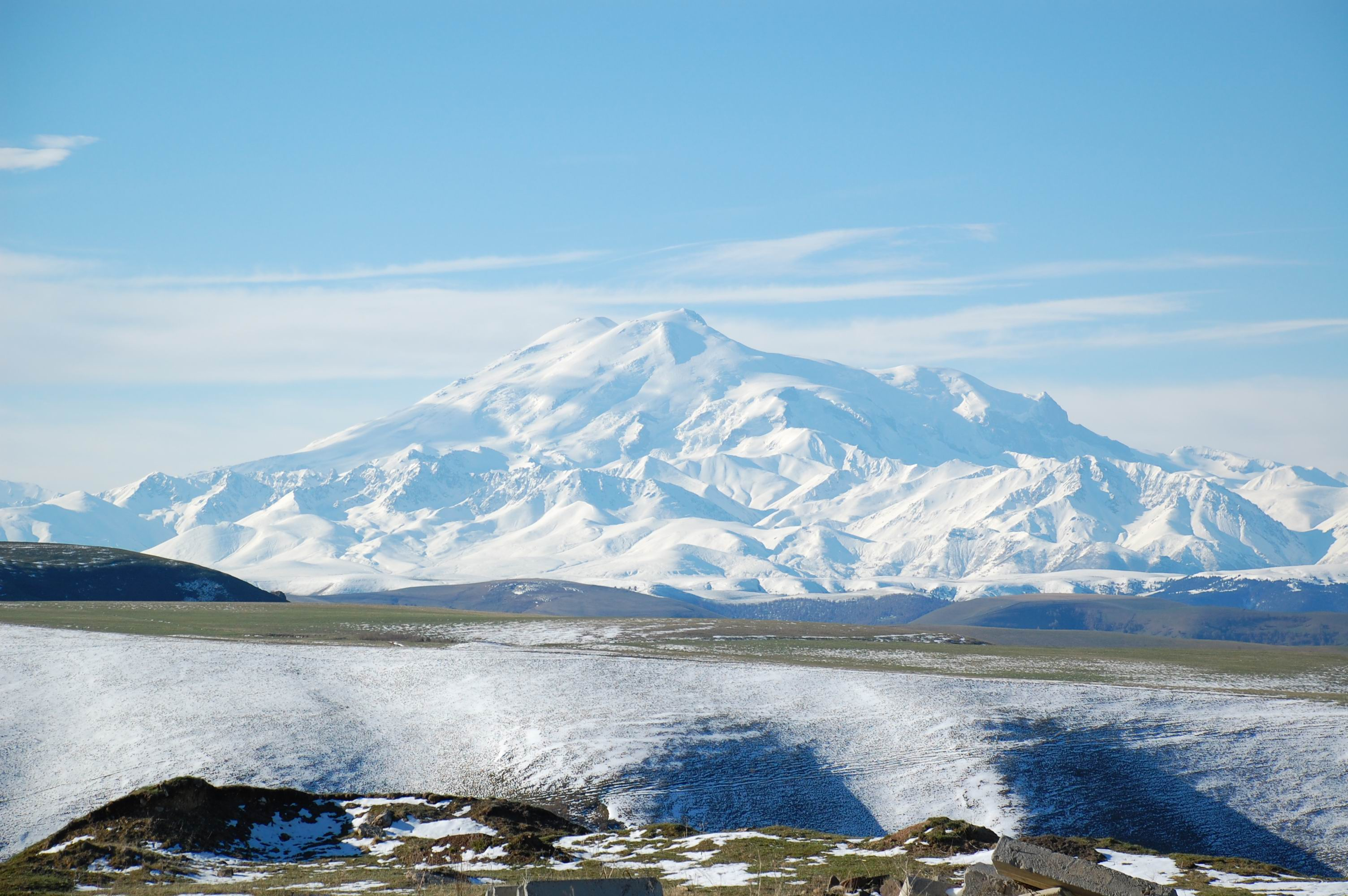
Mount Elbrus, Russia, Europe

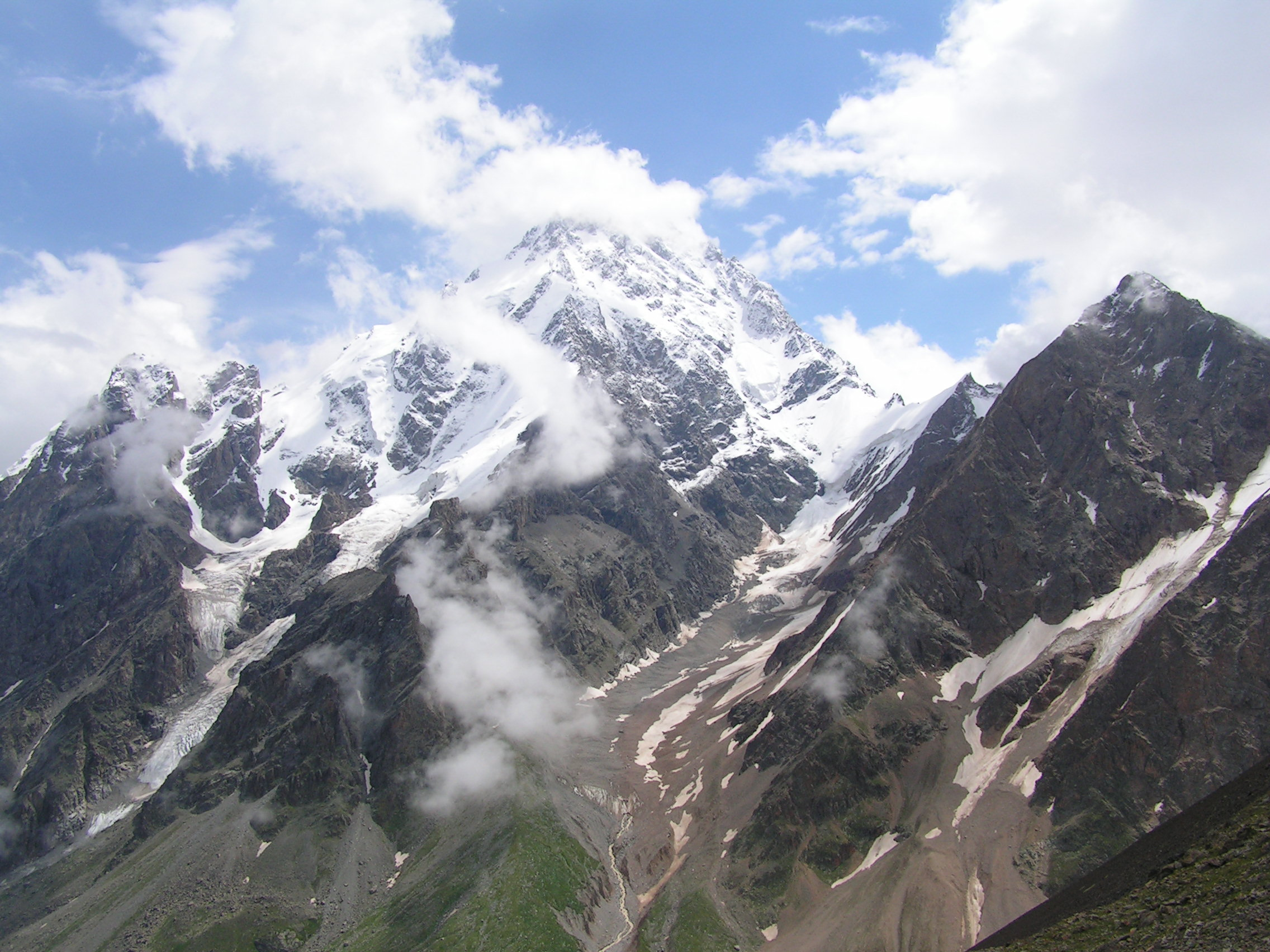
Dykh-Tau, Russia, Europe

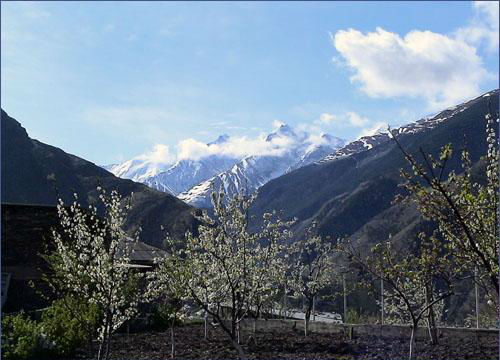
Mount Addala-Shukhgelmeer, Russia, Europe

No	Peak	Country	Elevation (m)	Prominence (m)	Col (m)
1	Mount Elbrus	Russia	5,642	4,741	901
2	Mount Bazarduzu	Russia / Azerbaijan	4,466	2,454	2012
3	Mount Kazbek	Russia / Georgia	5,034	2,353	2681
4	Tebulosmta	Russia / Georgia	4,493	2,145	2348
5	Dykh-Tau	Russia	5,205	2,002	3203
6	Dyultydag	Russia	4,127	1,834	2293
7	Gora Addala Shukgelmezr	Russia	4,152	1,792	2360
8	Gora Shan	Russia / Georgia	4,451	1,775	2676

The boundary between Asia and Europe is following the main ridge of the Caucasus Mountains, also forming most of the border between Georgia and Russia. From the above listed 8 peaks, four (Mount Elbrus, Dykh-Tau, Dyultydag, Gora Addala Shukgelmezr) are entirely in Europe, and four are on the border itself and so are both in Asia and Europe.

== Crimea ==
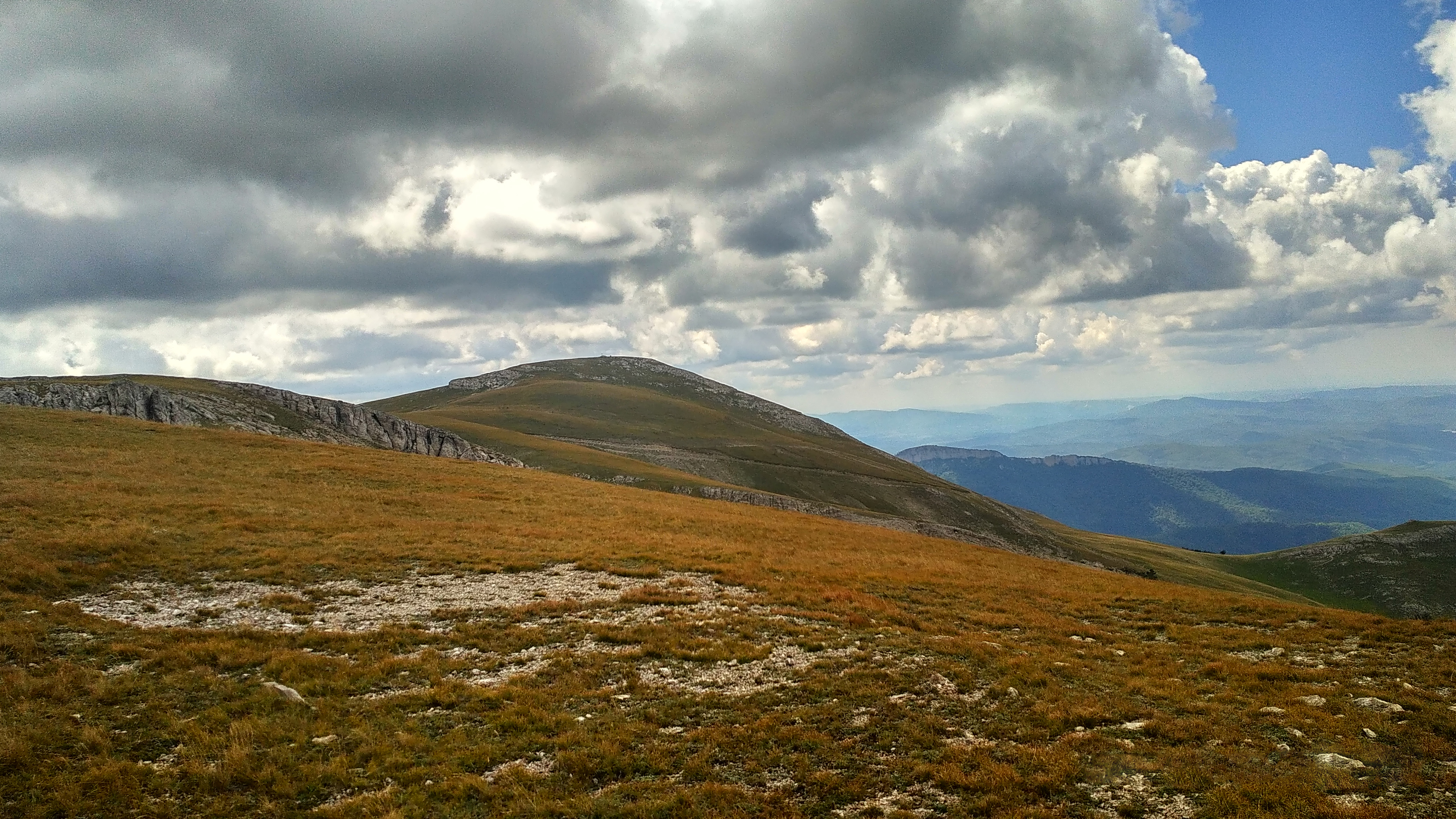
Roman-Kosh, Crimea

No	Peak	Country	Elevation (m)	Prominence (m)	Col (m)
1	Roman-Kosh	Territory of Ukraine, occupied by Russia	1,545	1,541	4

== Greek islands and Peloponnese ==
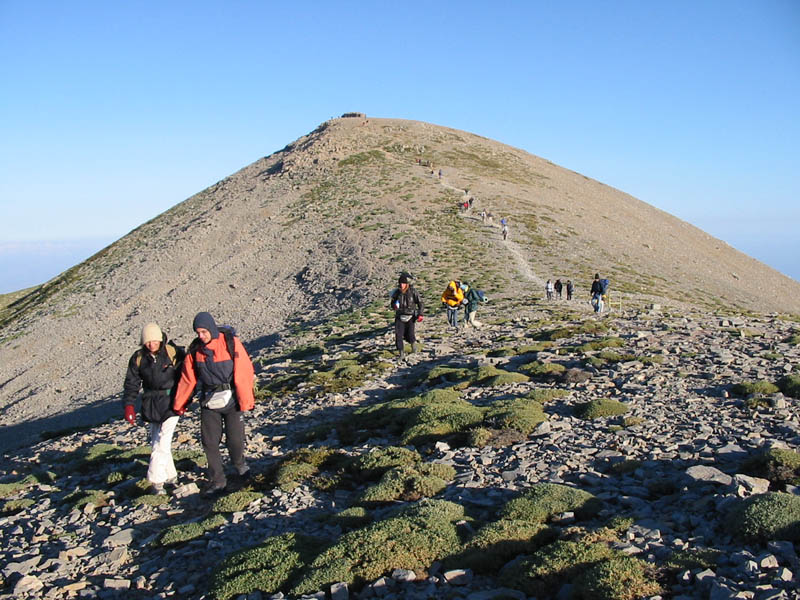
Mount Ida, Greece

No	Peak	Country	Elevation (m)	Prominence (m)	Col (m)
1	Mount Ida	Greece (Crete)	2,456	2,456	0
2	Taygetus	Greece	2,404	2,344	60
3	Lefka Ori	Greece (Crete)	2,453	2,038	415
4	Mount Kyllini	Greece	2,376	1,870	506
5	Dikti	Greece (Crete)	2,148	1,798	350
6	Dirfi	Greece (Euboea)	1,743	1,743	0
7	Mount Ainos	Greece (Kefalonia)	1,628	1,628	0
8	Fengari	Greece (Samothrace)	1,611	1,611	0

== Pyrenees & Iberian Peninsula ==
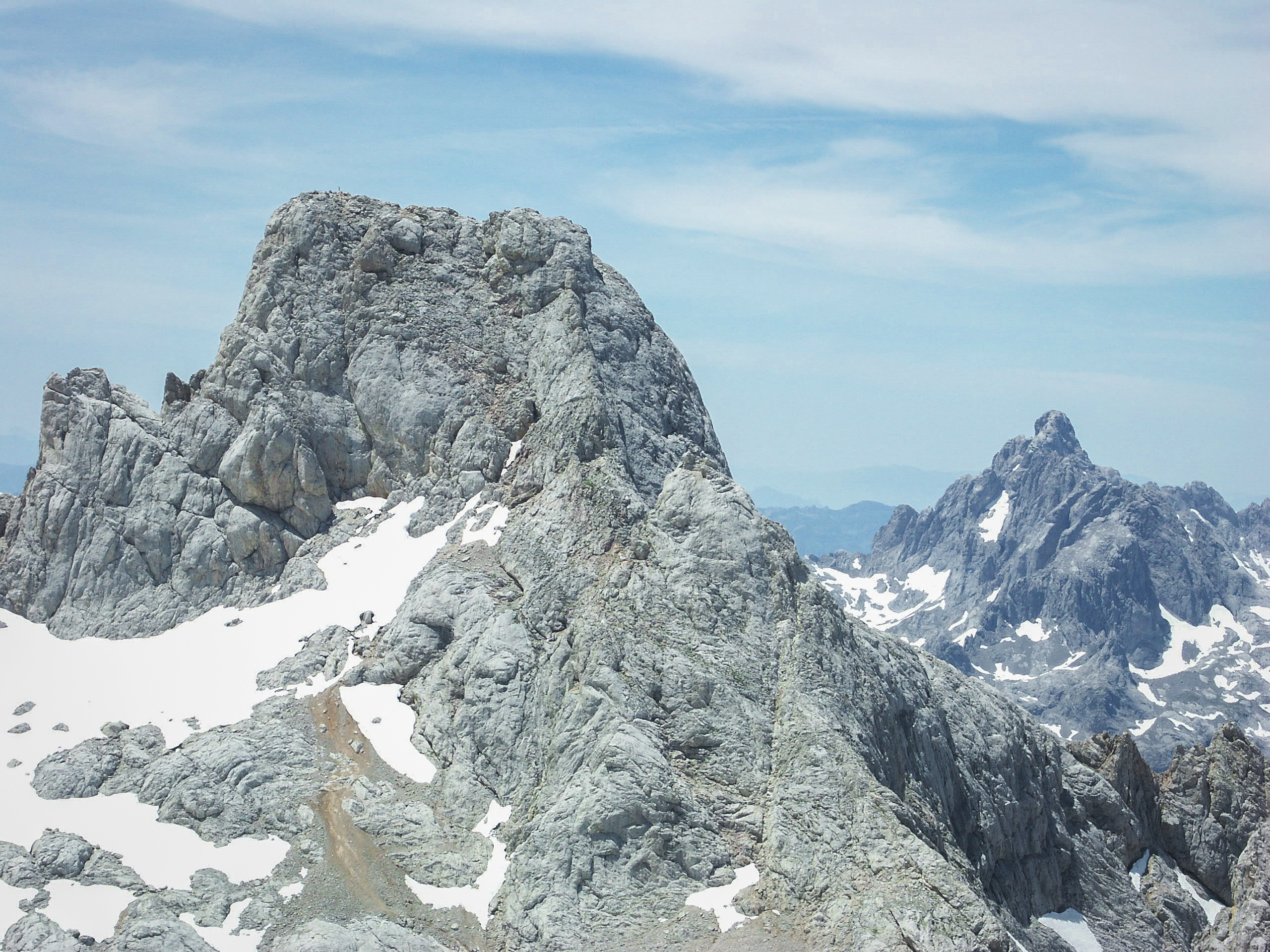
Torre de Cerredo, Spain

No	Peak	Country	Elevation (m)	Prominence (m)	Col (m)
1	Mulhacén	Spain	3,479	3,285	194
2	Aneto	Spain	3,404	2,812	592
3	Torre de Cerredo	Spain	2,648	1,931	717
4	Pico Almanzor	Spain	2,592	1,690	902

== Massif Central ==
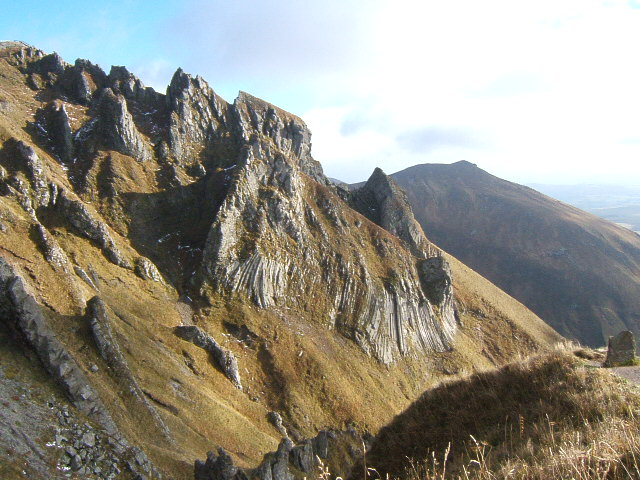
Puy de Sancy, France

No	Peak	Country	Elevation (m)	Prominence (m)	Col (m)
1	Puy de Sancy	France	1,885	1,578	307

== Scandinavia ==
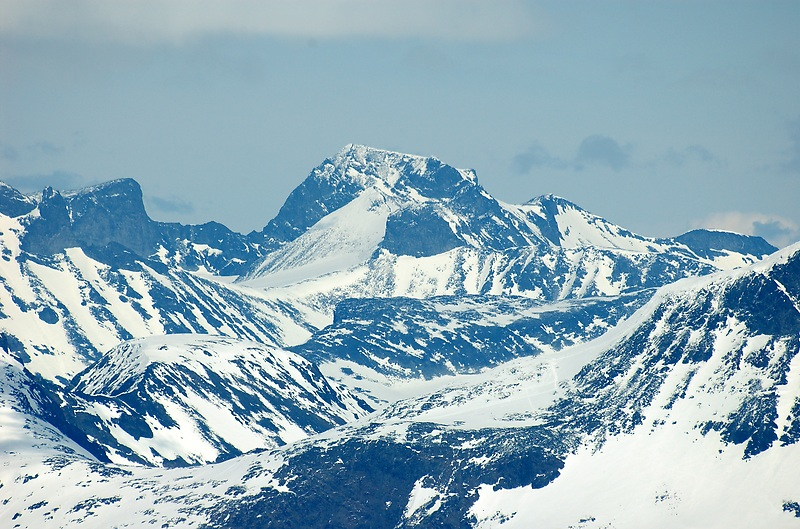
Galdhøpiggen, Oppland

No	Peak	Country	Elevation (m)	Prominence (m)	Col (m)
1	Galdhøpiggen	Norway	2,469	2,372	97
2	Kebnekaise	Sweden	2,099	1,740	359
3	Jiehkkevárri	Norway	1,834	1,741	93
4	Snøhetta	Norway	2,286	1,675	611
5	Store Lenangstind	Norway	1,624	1,576	48
6	Sarektjåhkkå	Sweden	2,089	1,519	570

== Ural Mountains ==
No	Peak	Country	Elevation (m)	Prominence (m)	Col (m)
1	Mount Narodnaya	Russia	1,894	1,772	123

== Peaks over 1500 m elevation that miss the 1500-m cutoff ==
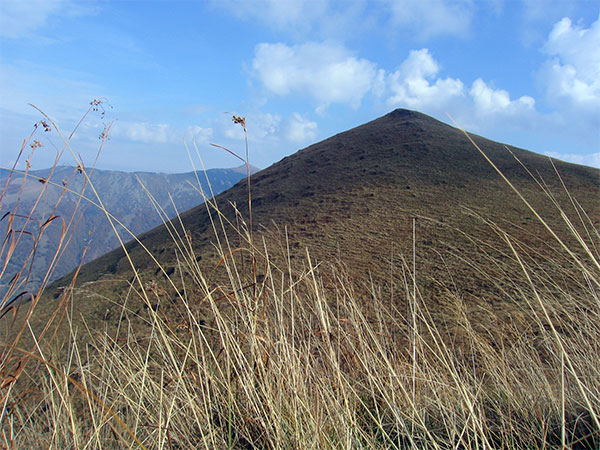
Midžor, Bulgaria and Serbia

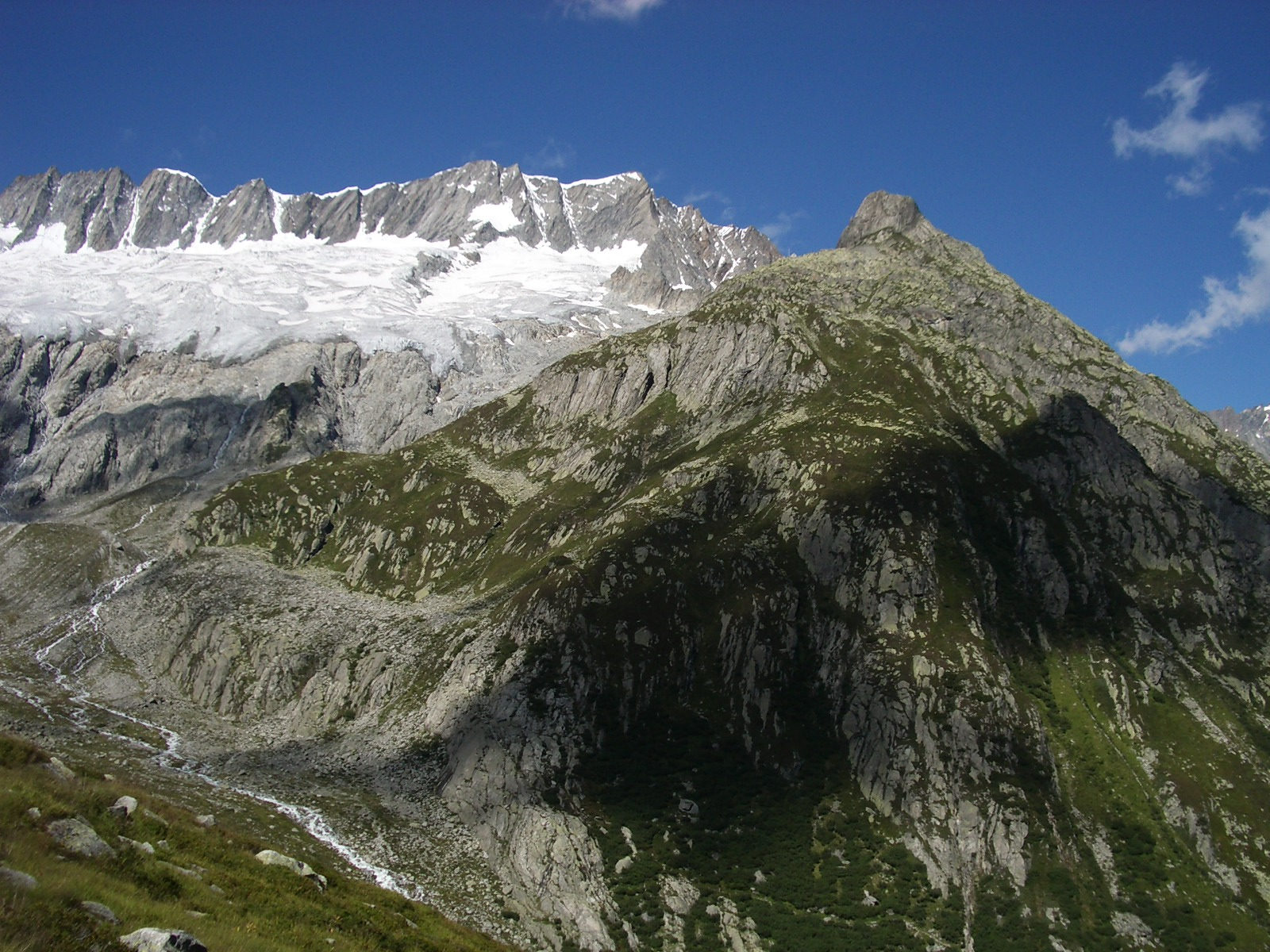
Dammastock, Switzerland

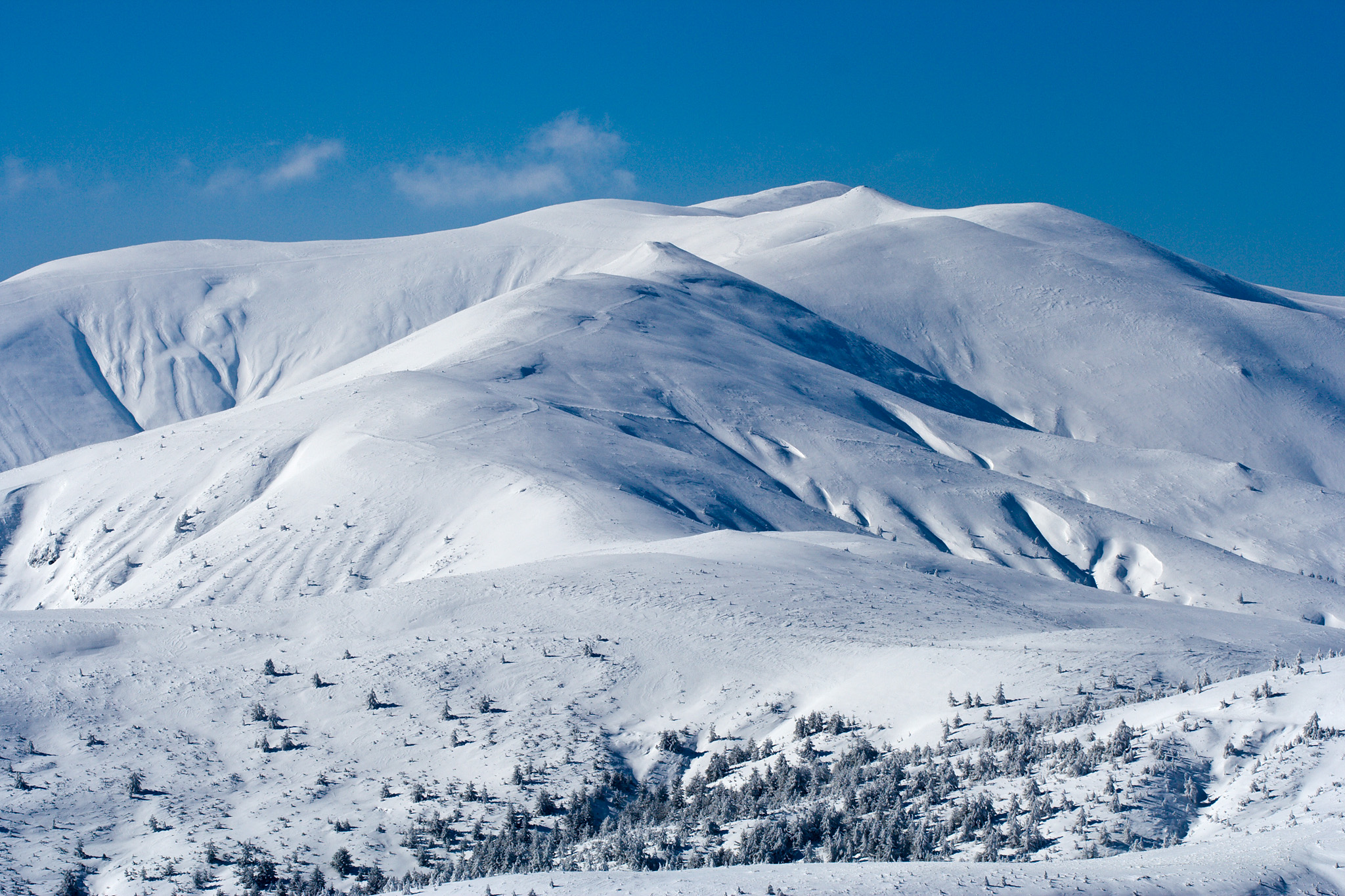
Ruen peak, Osogovo, Bulgaria and North Macedonia

No	Peak	Country	Elevation (m)	Prominence (m)	Col (m)
1	Taillefer	France	2,857	1,490	1367
2	Monte Amiata	Italy	1,738	1,490	248
3	Midžor	Bulgaria/Serbia	2,169	1,479	690
4	Curcubăta Mare	Romania	1,849	1,478	371
5	Bobotov Kuk	Montenegro	2,522	1,477	1045
6	Monte Togano	Italy	2,301	1,474	827
7	Pourianos Stavros (Pelion)	Greece (Thessaly)	1,610	1,473	137
8	Torrecilla	Spain (Andalucia)	1,919	1,472	447
9	Dammastock	Switzerland (Urner)	3,630	1,465	2,165
10	Monte Vettore	Italy (Apennines)	2,476	1,463	1013
11	Raucheck	Austria	2,430	1,463	967
12	Haldensteiner Calanda	Switzerland	2,806	1,461	1,345
13	Gjegnen	Norway	1,670	1,460	210
14	Monte Cristallo	Italy	3,221	1,420	1,801
15	Ruen	Bulgaria / North Macedonia	2,251	1,416	835
16	Schneeberg	Austria	2,076	1,348	728
17	Mount Yamantau	Russia	1,640	1,330	310
18	Cherni Vrah	Bulgaria	2,290	1,259	1031
19	Torre	Portugal	1,993	1,204	789

== Highest European ultra-prominent peaks ==
List of the highest European ultra-prominent peaks (elevation above 2,900 m and prominence above 1,500 m):

No	Peak	Country	Elevation (m)	Prominence (m)	Col (m)
1	Mount Elbrus	Russia	5,642	4,741	901
2	Dykh-Tau	Russia	5,205	2,002	3203
3	Mont Blanc	France/Italy	4,810	4,697	113
4	Dufourspitze (Monte Rosa)	Switzerland	4,634	2,165	2469
5	Grand Combin	Switzerland	4,314	1,517	2797
6	Finsteraarhorn	Switzerland	4,274	2,280	1994
7	Gora Addala Shukgelmezr	Russia	4,152	1,792	2360
8	Dyultydag	Russia	4,127	1,834	2293
9	Barre des Écrins	France	4,102	2,045	2057
10	Gran Paradiso	Italy	4,061	1,891	2170
11	Piz Bernina	Switzerland	4,049	2,234	1815
12	Ortler	Italy	3,905	1,953	1952
13	Monte Viso	Italy	3,841	2,062	1779
14	Grossglockner	Austria	3,798	2,423	1375
15	Wildspitze	Austria	3,768	2,261	1507
16	Tödi	Switzerland	3,614	1,570	2044
17	Presanella	Italy	3,558	1,676	1882
18	Mulhacén	Spain	3,479	3,285	194
19	Piz Kesch	Switzerland	3,418	1,502	1916
20	Aneto	Spain	3,404	2,812	592
21	Marmolada	Italy	3,343	2,131	1212
22	Mount Etna	Italy (Sicily)	3,357	3,357	0
23	Monte Antelao	Italy	3,264	1,735	1529
24	Dents du Midi	Switzerland	3,257	1,796	1461
25	Cima Tosa	Italy	3,173	1,521	1652
26	Pizzo di Coca	Italy	3,050	1,878	1172
27	Hoher Dachstein	Austria	2,995	2,136	859
28	Zugspitze	Austria/Germany	2,962	1,746	1216
29	Hochkönig	Austria	2,941	2,181	760
30	Musala	Bulgaria	2,925	2,473	432
31	Mount Olympus (Mytikas)	Greece	2,917	2,353	564
32	Vihren	Bulgaria	2,915	1,784	1131
33	Corno Grande	Italy	2,912	2,476	436

== See also ==
- Most isolated major summits of Europe
- Southernmost glacial mass in Europe
