= Scutari vilayet =

Division of the Ottoman Empire located in Montenegro and Albania

Vilâyet-i İşkodra Vilajeti i Shkodrës
- Vilayet of the Ottoman Empire
- 1867–1913
- Flag

- The Scutari Vilayet in 1867–1912
- Capital: Scutari (present-day Shkodër)
- Area
  - Coordinates: 42°4′N 19°30′E
- Population
  - 1911: 349,455
- History
  - Vilayet Law: 1867
  - First Balkan War: 1913
Preceded by	Succeeded by
Sanjak of Scutari	Provisional Government of Albania; Kingdom of Montenegro
- Today part of: Montenegro; Albania

The Vilayet of Scutari, Shkodër or Shkodra (Turkish: İşkodra Vilayeti or Vilayet-i İşkodra; Albanian: Vilajeti i Shkodrës) was a first-level administrative division (vilayet) of the Ottoman Empire that existed from 1867 to 1913, located in parts of what today is Montenegro and Albania. In the late 19th century it reportedly had an area of 13,800 square kilometres (5,310 square miles). It bordered the Principality of Montenegro, the Kosovo vilayet, the Manastir vilayet, and the Janina vilayet.

== History ==
The Scutari Vilayet was established in 1867. The Sanjak of Scutari was established when Ottoman Empire acquired Shkodra after the Siege of Shkodra in 1478–79. A big part of the Principality of Zeta was added to the territory of the Sanjak of Scutari in 1499. In 1514 this territory was separated from the Sanjak of Scutari and established as a separate Sanjak of Montenegro, under the rule of Skenderbeg Crnojević. When he died in 1528, the Sanjak of Montenegro was merged into the Sanjak of Scutari, as a unique administrative unit and with a certain degree of autonomy.

In 1867, the Sanjak of Scutari merged with the Sanjak of Skopje and became the Scutari Vilayet. Its sanjaks were the Sanjak of Scutari, Prizren, and Sanjak of Dibra. In 1877, Prizren passed to the Kosovo Vilayet and Dibra passed to the Monastir Vilayet, while Durrës (Dıraç) township became the Sanjak of Durrës. After the Russo-Turkish War (1877–1878) Bar, Podgorica, İşpozi and Zabyak townships were ceded to Montenegro in 1878. Also Ülgün was ceded to Montenegro in 1881.

In the late Ottoman period, unlike in other areas of the empire, Albanian Catholics in Scutari vilayet had access to emerging Albanian language schooling, subsidized by Austria-Hungary. Local Catholic clergy were also involved in developing mostly religious Albanian literature, aimed at preserving and strengthening the Roman Catholic faith in the region. Due partly to the location of being near the border with Montenegro the state exempted the townspeople of Scutari from regular military service and unlike other urban dwellers within the empire they paid fewer taxes.

Ottoman control mainly existed in the few urban centres and valleys of the vilayet and was minimal and almost non-existent in the mountains, where Malisors (Albanian highlanders) lived an autonomous existence according to kanun (tribal law) of Lek Dukagjini. Disputes would be solved through tribal law within the framework of vendetta or gjakmarrja (blood feuding) and the activity was widespread among the Malisors, while Ottoman officials strongly disproved of the practice. Nineteen percent of male deaths in Scutari vilayet were caused by murders due to vendetta and blood feuding during the late Ottoman period. Malisors viewed Ottoman officials as a threat to their tribal way of living and left it to their bayraktars (chieftains) to deal with the Ottoman political system.

The Malisors (highlanders) lived in three geographical regions within İşkodra sanjak. Malësia e Madhe (Great Highlands) with its religiously mixed Catholic-Muslim five large tribes (Hoti, Kelmendi, Shkreli, Kastrati and Gruda) and seven smaller tribes; Dukagjin Highlands with seven Catholic tribes such as the Shala, Shoshi, Toplana, Nikaj; and Mirdita which was also a large powerful tribe that could mobilise 5,000 irregular troops. The government estimated the military strength of Malisors in İşkodra sanjak as numbering over 30,000 tribesmen and Ottoman officials were of the view that the highlanders could defeat Montenegro on their own with limited state assistance.

The Dıraç sanjak contained the fertile plain of Zadrima between Mirdita and the Drin river. Political life in the sanjak was dominated by a few powerful Albanian landowners such as the Toptani family, who controlled the area around Kruja and Tirana as a family fiefdom holding around 123,000 acres. To protect economic interests landowning beys in the area maintained small private armies, numbering between 200 and 500 men, who also served as bodyguards during travel. In the 1880s from an Albanian point of view the sanjaks of İşkodra and Dıraç along with the whole of İşkodra vilayet belonged to the region of Gegënia.

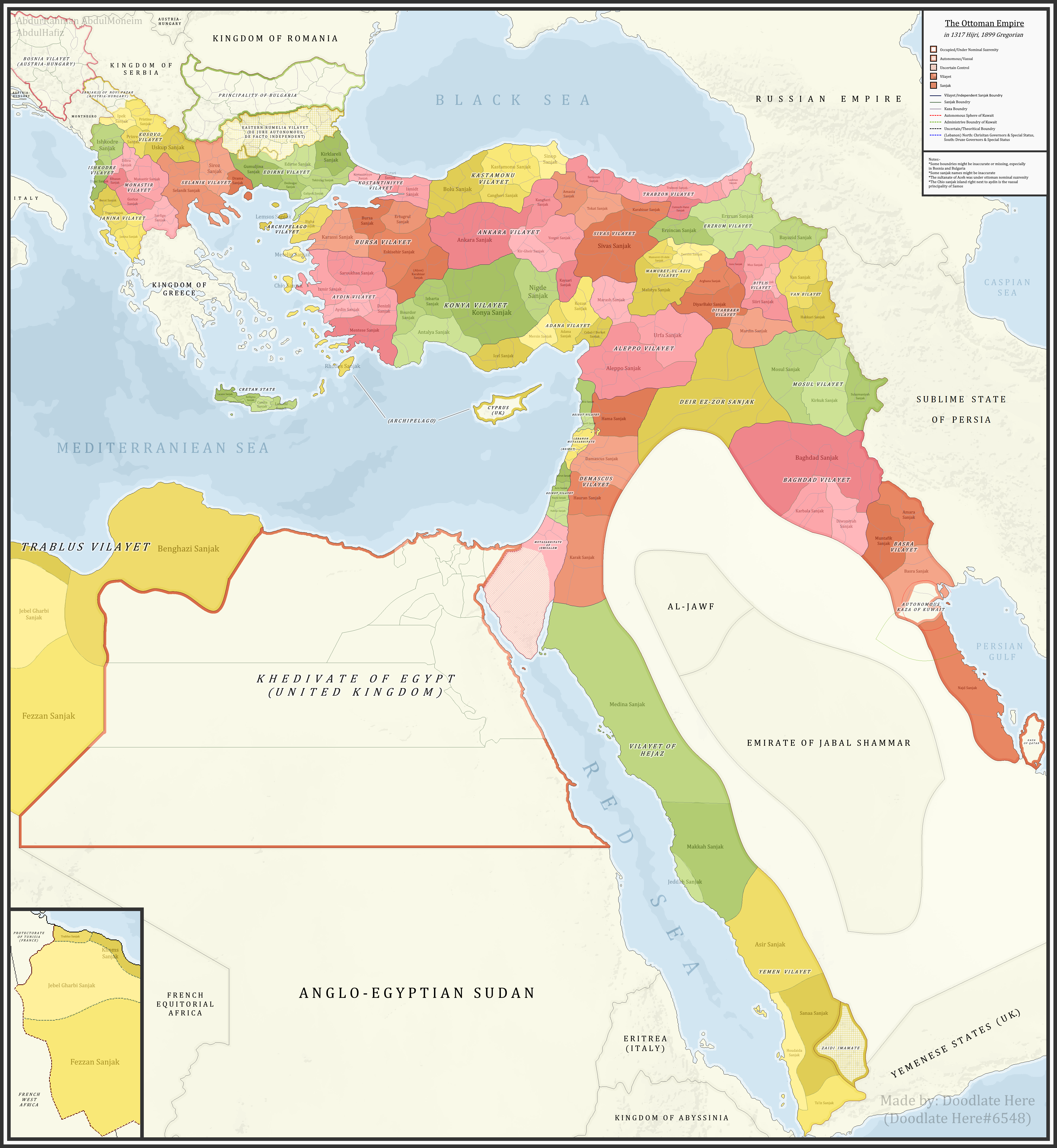
A map showing the administrative divisions of the Ottoman Empire in 1317 Hijri, 1899 Gregorian, Including the Vilayet of Scutari and its Sanjaks.

In 1912 and the beginning of 1913 the vilayet was under the occupation by members of the Balkan League during the First Balkan War. In 1914 the territory of the Scutari Vilayet became a part of the Principality of Albania, established based on peace contract, signed at the conclusion of the London Conference in 1913.

== Administrative divisions ==
Sanjaks of the Vilayet:

1. Sanjak of Scutari (Shkodër, Lezhë, Orosh, Pukë, Tuzi)
2. Sanjak of Durrës (Durrës, Tirana, Krujë, Kavajë, Shijak)

== Demographics ==
During the 1880s, the population of İşkodra vilayet ranged between 200,000 and 300,000 people, split between the two sanjaks of İşkodra (Catholic majority) and Dıraç (Muslim majority). Albanians were the main ethnicity in the vilayet consisting more than 90 percent of the population.

Ottoman-Albanian intellectual Sami Frashëri during the 1880s estimated the population of Shkodër as numbering 37,000 inhabitants that consisted of three-quarters being Muslims and the rest Christians made up of mostly Catholics and a few hundred Orthodox.

=== 1874 estimation ===
According to the Russian consulate Ivan Yastrebov's estimations, there were 80.000 Catholic males, 20.000 Orthodox males, and 9.500 Muslim males in the Sanjak of Scutari. The majority of the population spoke the Albanian language. He asserted that the Orthodox, and a number of Muslims, spoke the Serbian language.

=== 1911 estimation ===
According to Ottoman census data, the total population of the vilayet in 1911 was 349,455 with the following ethnoreligious composition (Orthodox Serbs and Albanians were counted as Greeks):

- Muslims - 218,089
- Catholics - 120,611
- Greeks - 10,755

=== 1912 estimation ===
A publication from 21 December 1912 in the Belgian magazine Ons Volk Ontwaakt (Our Nation Awakes) estimated 185,200 inhabitants:

- Muslim Albanians - 80,000
- Muslim Serbs - 40,000
- Orthodox Serbs - 30,000
- Catholic Albanians - 14,000
- Orthodox Vlachs - 10,000
- Jews - 5,000
- Muslim Gypsies - 5,000
- Muslim Turks - 1,200

== See also ==
- Vilayets of the Ottoman Empire
