= Nikaj-Mërtur =

Nikaj-Mërtur may refer to:

- Nikaj-Mërtur region, a regional nature park in northern Albania
- Nikaj, historical Albanian tribe and region
- Mërturi, historical Albanian tribe and region
