= Highlands of Gjakova =

Ethnographic region in Albania

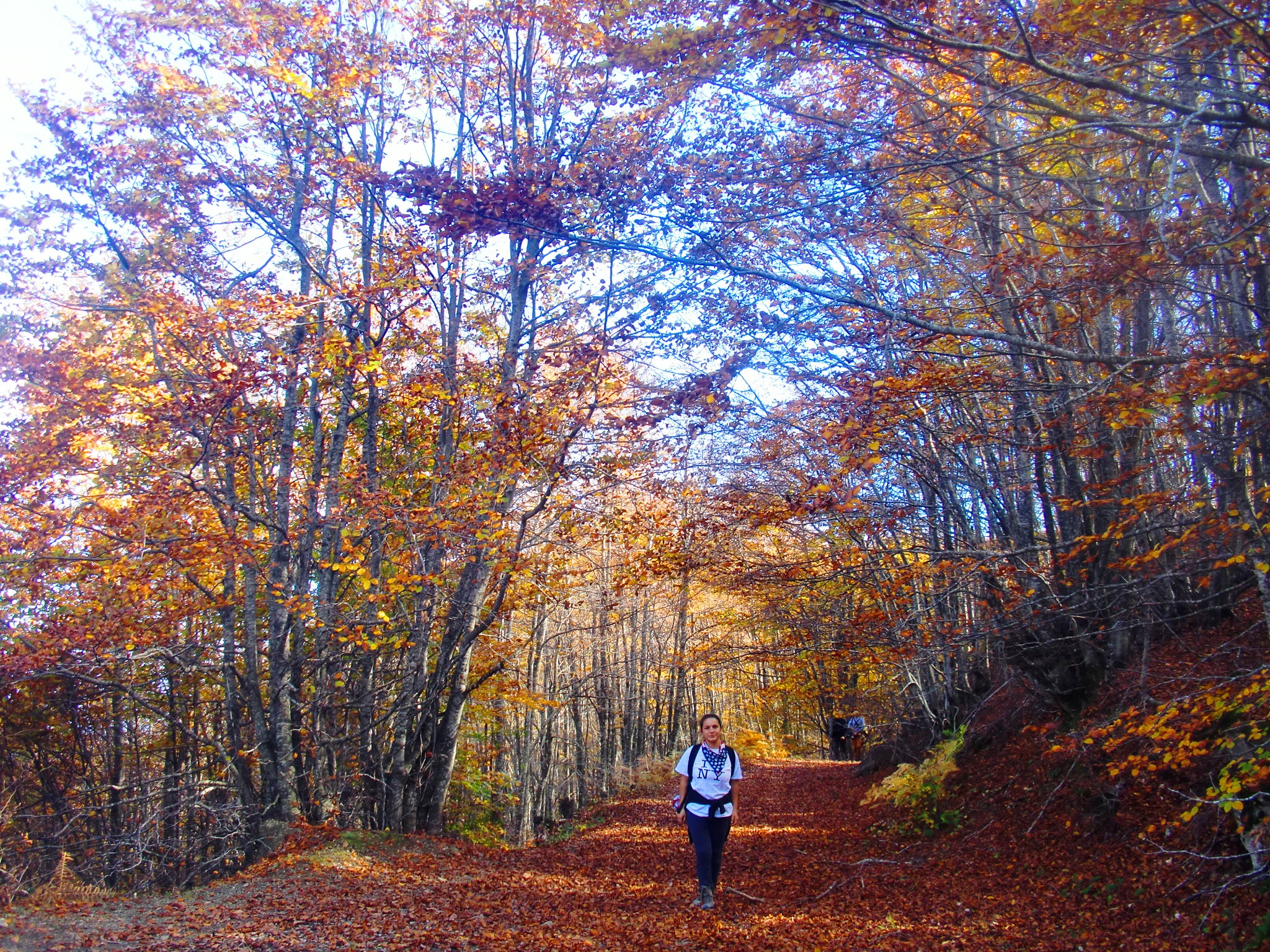
Koshare Peak, Gjakova Highlands

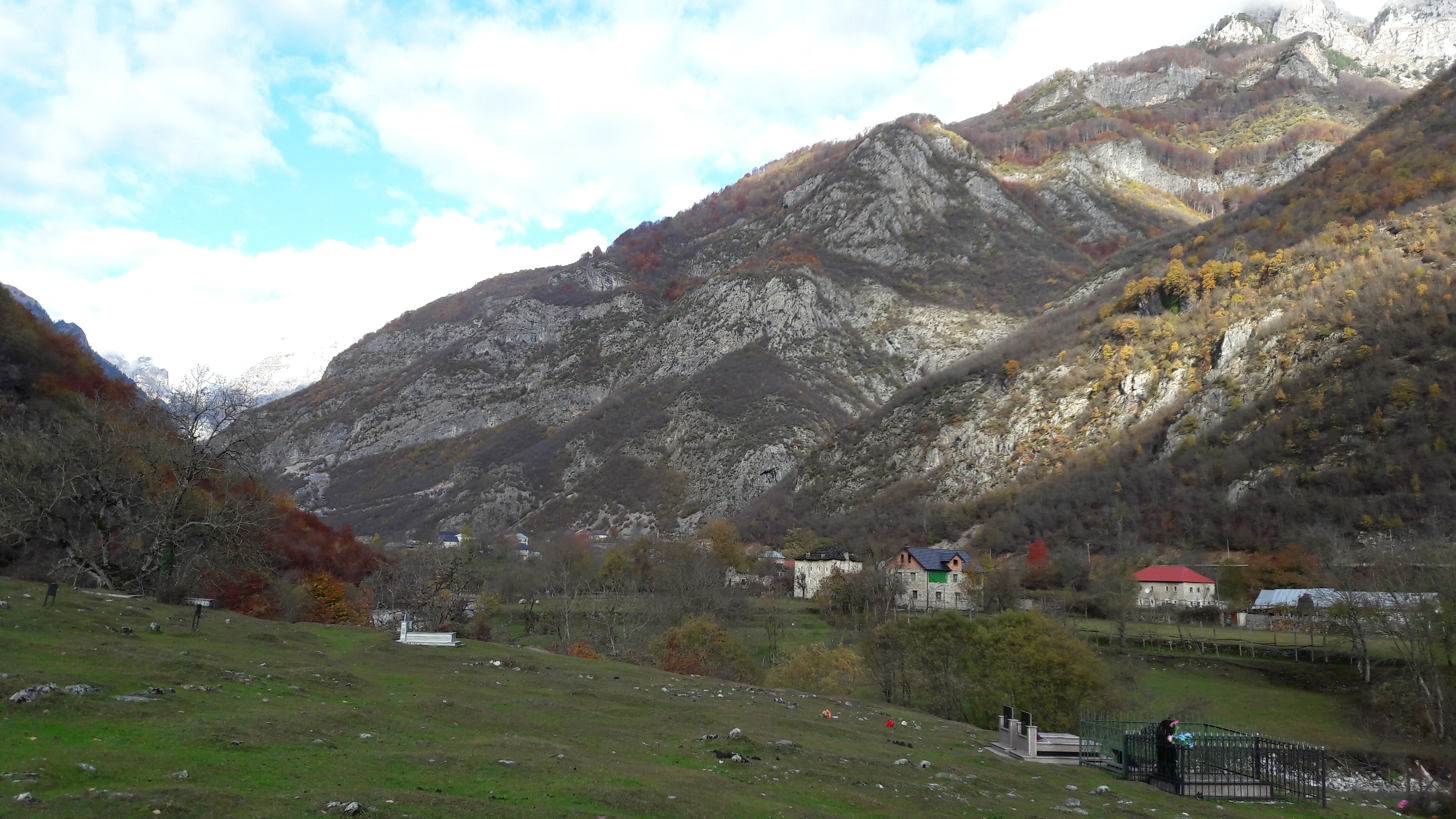
Dragobia, Gjakova Highlands

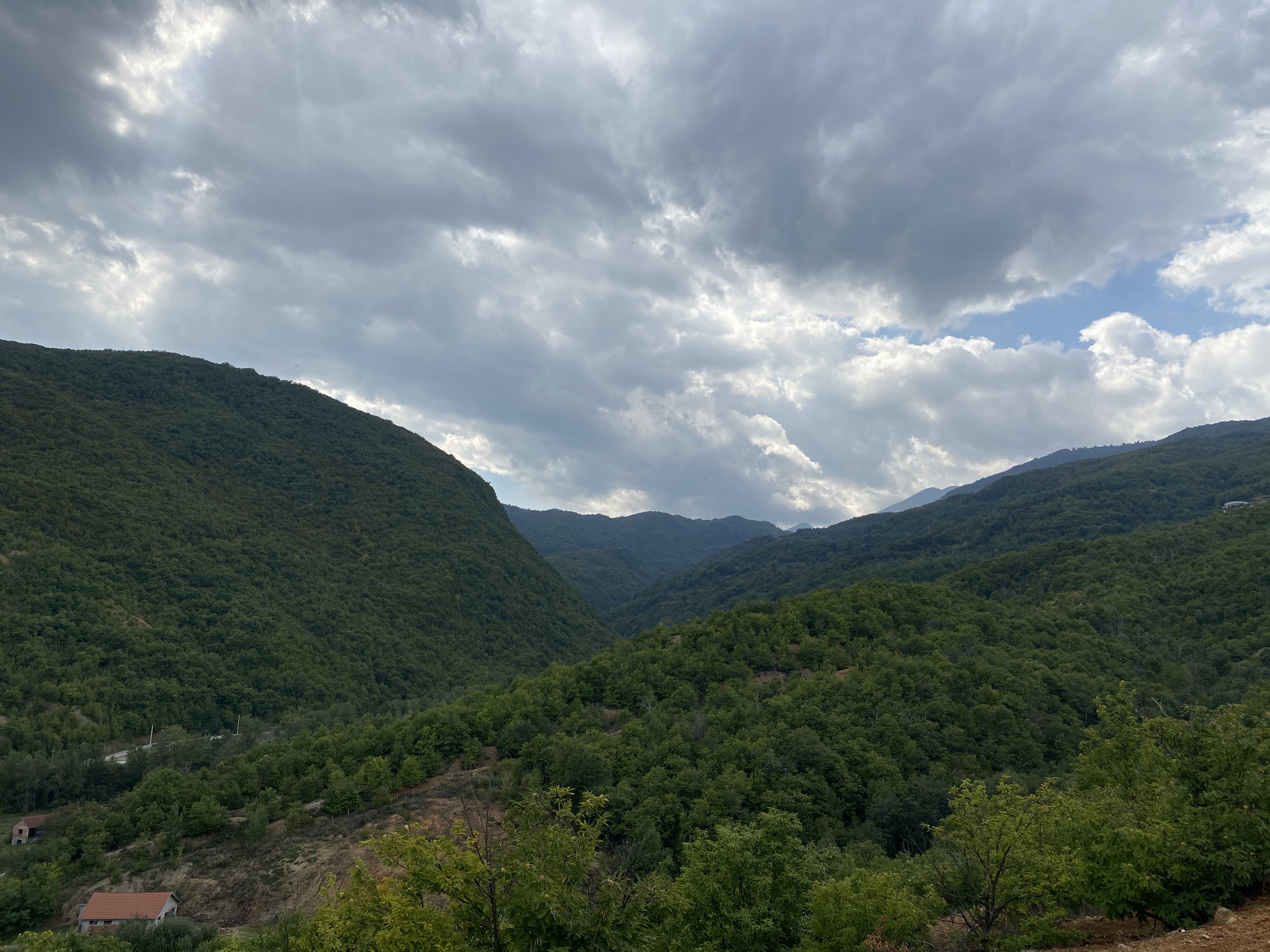
A photo of a section of the Highlands of Gjakova within Kosovo's border.

The Highlands of Gjakova or Gjakova Highlands (Albanian: Malësia e Gjakovës), known colloquially as Tropoja, refers to the mountainous ethnographic region in the eastern Albanian Alps that sits between north-eastern Albania and western Kosovo, serving as the historical centres of the Albanian Gashi, Krasniqi, Bytyçi, Morina, Nikaj and Mërturi tribes. Traditionally, parts of the Gjakova Highlands that are now located in southern Montenegro were used as pasturelands by the local Albanian tribes.

== Geography ==
The Highlands of Gjakova are bordered by Kosovo's Plain of Dukagjin to the east, the Fierza Lake to the south, the ethnographic Dukagjin Highlands region to the west and the mountains of Plav and Guci to the north. Much of the region corresponds to the Tropoja Municipality of Albania, with the main municipal centre in Bajram Curri. This section consists of 54 villages and around 28,154 inhabitants. The Gjakova Highlands of Kosovo consist of Koshare, Botushë, Morina and the other mountainous areas and settlements in the west of the District of Gjakova. In Montenegro, areas to the east of Vuthaj are also considered to be part of the ethnographic Gjakova Highlands region. The region consists of the valued and protected Valbonë Valley National Park, Gashi Nature Reserve and the Nikaj-Mërtur Regional Nature Park, as well as certain sections of the Bjeshkët e Nemuna National Park across the border.

There are several rivers, basins and waterways within the region, including but not limited to the Valbona, Gashi, Curraj/Nikaj, Bushtrica and Llugaj rivers as well as lakes such as the Xhema. It is home to many different peaks due to its mountainous terrain, including Maja e Hekurave, Maja e Kollatës, Mali i Zhaborreve, Shkëlzeni and Maja Jezercë.

=== Flora ===
The Gjakova Highlands are characterised by alpine landscapes, deep valleys, vertical cliffs, dense coniferous and deciduous forests, small lakes and rivers. The levels of vegetation in the Albanian Alps meet the alpine level, from upland valleys through the montane mountain stage on forest-free alpine and subalpine mats and subnivale tundra caused by permafrost in vast heaps of rubble with raw soils.

In view of phytogeography, the Valbonë Valley National Park falls within the Dinaric Mountains mixed forests terrestrial ecoregion of the Palearctic temperate broadleaf and mixed forest. The forests of the park are covered by a mixture of deciduous and coniferous trees growing on limestone and dolomite, which is characteristic to the Albanian Alps. The most typical feature of the park's landscape is represented by its forests being a major resource in terms of their ecological functions, as well as in terms of the beauty they lend to the landscape. The pine is one of the most common species of tree in the park. The area, which is dotted with pine, is mainly overgrown with austrian, balkan, bosnian and scots pine. The area around the village of Valbona is characterized by the predominance of different beech species such as European beech. The park is, however, considered to be the only area in the country, where a high number of forest formations with norway spruce can be found. A lush mixed forest occurs in the upper part of the valley represented with a mixture of silver fir, common beech, norway spruce and scots pine.

The banks of Valbona River are covered mainly with forests of grey alder, olive willow and goat willow. Besides, the park contains boglands, which are situated in the wet low lying environments whereas various species of narthecium, carex and sphagnum can be found. The steep slopes and ravines of the Valbona Valley are home to communities of largeleaf linden, sycamore, ash and wych elm, which grow mostly in cool and humid locations.

Similarly, the Nikaj-Mërtur Regional Nature Park falls within the Dinaric Mountains mixed forests terrestrial ecoregion of the Palearctic temperate broadleaf and mixed forest biome. The vegetation of the park includes many communities of a Mediterranean and Eurasian type. It is covered by a mixture of oak, beech and pine trees growing on limestone and dolomite, which is characteristically to the Alps. The most widespread floral communities of oak are dominated by italian oak, austrian oak, sessile oak and macedonian oak. The beech and pine trees are represented by species such as European beech, bosnian pine and austrian pine.

The climate of the Gashi Nature Reserve is subarctic and oceanic, having cool summers and generally cold winters. Forests occupy the majority of the region's area. The region falls within the Balkan mixed forests and Dinaric Mountains mixed forests terrestrial ecoregion of the Palearctic temperate broadleaf and mixed forests biome. The river is particularly known for the diversity of flora and fauna and is surrounded by swamps and canals that drain the whole local basin such as the region of Malësia e Gashit within the Albanian Alps into the Adriatic sea. Forests occupy the majority of the total area. The diverse flora is characterized with high endemism due to the combination of southern geographic latitude and high altitude variation. The forests are host to several plants such as beech, macedonian pine, bosnian pine, norway spruce, and silver fir.

=== Fauna ===
Due to the temperature and climate differences between different areas and elevations, the Valbonë Valley National Park is characterized by exceptionally rich and varied fauna. The park represents one of the most important national bio centers of wild fauna in the country. The wider land area is one of the last areas in Europe, in which a great number of brown bears and grey wolves can be found. The park is potentially a habitat for the endangered lynx. One of the park's special attractions is the existence of the rare chamois, which can be found at higher altitudes far from human activity. Most important wildlife inhabiting the Valbona Valley include roe deer and wild boar. We can also witness the presence of western western capercaillie and golden eagle.

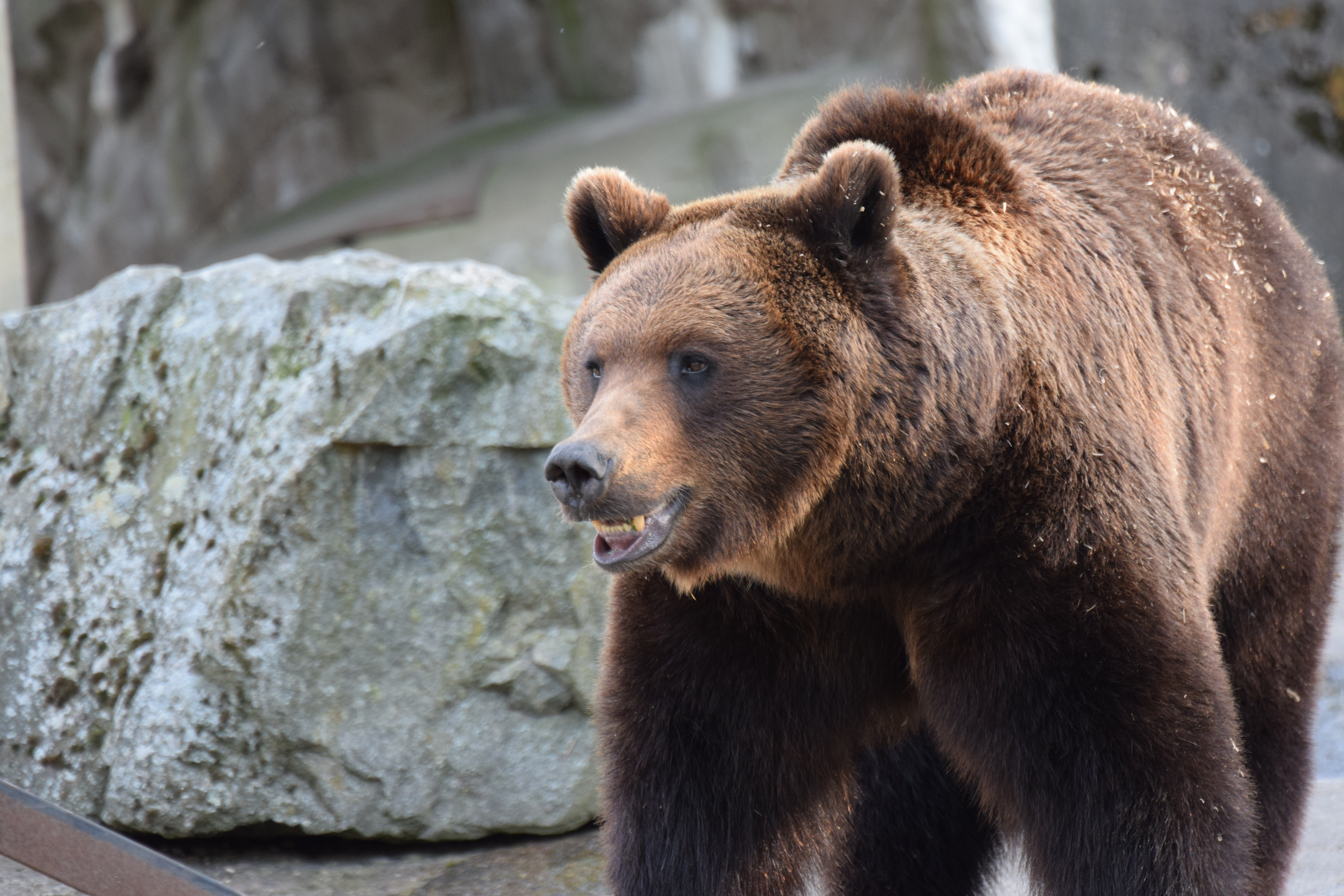
The endangered brown bear still survive within the boundaries of the park.

Sources of water, becks and glacial lakes are the basis of life for water insects, amphibians, and salmons. Species of fish are represented with species such as the marble trout and river trout. The limited number of species is determined by the predominant bodies of water including glacial lakes, streams and upper river courses, which are inhabited by fish species.

Due to its strategic position and the mosaic distribution of various types of habitats, the park is quite rich of bird genera. The total number of bird species is 145. Important birds of prey with high conservation value include the golden eagle, booted eagle, egyptian vulture, sparrowhawk, goshawk, lanner falcon, saker falcon, peregrine falcon and honey buzzard. The park hosts seven species and populations owls, such as the barn owl, scops owl, eagle owl, little owl, tawny owl, long-eared owl and short-eared owl. Other families of birds inhabiting the park include the alpine swift, alpine accentor, great cormorant, grey heron, rock partridge, common ringed plover, stock dove, common cuckoo and eurasian golden oriole.

The Nikaj-Mërtur Regional Nature Park features a great variety of ecosystems and shelters wildlife. It dwells a number of various species that are fast becoming rare in Southern Europe, with animals such as the eurasian lynx which inhabits the rugged forested areas, the endangered brown bear and gray wolf. Moreover, the woods provide also shelter for species including chamois, western capercaillie and griffon vulture. The park is an important sanctuary of the peregrine falcon and common kestrel.

The fauna of the Gashi Nature Reserve is represented by 64 species of mammals, such as the brown bear, gray wolf, chamois, lynx, roe deer, wild boar, western capercaillie, golden eagle, eurasian otter and 14 species of amphibians.

== History ==
=== Antiquity ===
The Highlands of Gjakova were inhabited by the Illyrian tribes during antiquity, as is evidenced by archaeological findings such as castles and tumuli found within the ethnographic region. The region lies within the geographical span of the Dardani tribe. Rosuja was considered to be the most popular city on the border of the Dardani and Labeat tribes, and it is dated to around 400BCE.

=== Middle ages ===
In the 15th century, the Spani family is documented as being in control of the general region; Pjetër Spani was documented as ruling over Lekbibaj, and his son, Leka, lived in Geghysen (present-day Selimaj) in the second half of the fifteenth century. Leka is referenced as one of the ancestral fathers of the Gashi tribe.

=== Ottoman period ===
After the Ottoman conquest of Albania and the subsequent period of Ottoman rule, the Highlands of Gjakova were initially administrated as part of the Nahiya of Altun-ili within the Sanjak of İpek and the Sanjak of Shkodra. In the 15th-16th centuries, the Nahiya of Altun-ili, including the Highlands of Gjakova, were predominantly inhabited by Albanians. Many villages and their inhabitants were registered with characteristically Albanian anthroponomy during the 15th-16th centuries without a trace of Slav anthroponomy.

The Gjakova Highlands were home to many participants of the various Albanian patriotic movements and rebellions of the 19th-21st centuries. The region was represented by notable figures such as Bajram Curri, Binak Alia, Mic Sokoli, Tahir Sinani and Shpend Dragobia. The Highlands of Gjakova were one of the regions that played an important role in Albanian independence and were integral to its foundation.

In May 1845, following Reşid Pasha's outlawing of the right to bear arms, 2,000 people from the Gjakova region, as well as the Highland tribes of Krasniqi, Gashi and Bytyçi, rose in revolt. The rebels, about 8,000 men, drove the Ottoman garrison out of Gjakova. The Ottomans suppressed the rebellion, but did not succeed in establishing effective control of the region.

In 1862 the Ottomans sent Maxharr Pasha with 12 divisions to implement the Tanzimat Reforms in the Highlands of Gjakova. Under the leadership of Mic Sokoli and Binak Alia, the tribes of Krasniqi, Gashi, Bytyçi, Nikaj and Mërturi organized a resistance near Bujan. The rebels were reinforced by the forces of Shala, led by Mark Lula. After heavy fighting, they managed to defeat the Ottoman force and expel them from the highlands.

During the Albanian uprising of 1912, Bajram Curri led the Krasniqi tribe to Prush Pass, near the Has region, where the Ottomans had left a garrison of four battalions. A bloody battle would follow, in which the Krasniqi were joined by the Hasi, Gashi and Bytyqi tribes in their siege of Prush Pass. This resulted in a heavy defeat for the Ottoman Turks, which left the rebels with much ammunition, arms, machine guns and cannons. There were many casualties for the Turks; hundreds of dead, wounded and prisoners of war. The prisoners of war were disarmed and released, and were told that the uprising was an attempt to free Albanian and Anatolian peasants from oppression in order to deceive them - they were surprised and had believed what they were told, and upon their return to the garrison of Gjakova, they had virtually demoralised the town's entire garrison. This battle improved the morale of the Albanians in their movement for independence.

=== World wars ===
The Bujan Conference was held in the Gjakova Highlands between December 31, 1943, to January 2, 1944, and it was a concrete undertaking by Albanians to unite the Kosovo region with Albania. There was not much enthusiasm for the fascist administration throughout Albanian-inhabited lands during World War II, but Kosovo Albanians preferred it over Serbian rule. By November 1944, the Yugoslav Partisans had subdued and taken control of Kosovo; Tito's Communists initially promised to allow the inhabitants of Kosovo (of an Albanian majority) to democratically decide on whether they wished to join Albania or Yugoslavia. The Bujan Conference confirmed the desire of Kosovo's Albanian majority for unification of Kosovo with Albania, but believing Serbia would not accept it, Tito wound up reneging on his promise and incorporated Kosovo into Yugoslavia instead.

== Tribes ==
There are several Albanian tribes centred in the Gjakova Highlands - the aforementioned Krasniqi, Gashi, Bytyqi, Morina, Nikaj and Mërturi (Nikaj and Mërturi are usually grouped together as Nikaj-Mërturi) tribes - who have been integral to the history and the development of the region. All of these tribes relied on Gjakova as their closest market town and were traditionally and culturally linked with the town itself. However, after the partition of the lands which had Albanian ethnic majority and the subsequent loss of the Ottoman Empire to Serbia and other Balkan countries, many of the Gjakova Highland tribes became destitute after being cut off from their main market town as the region of Kosovo became a part of the Serbian state. The tribes of the Gjakova Highlands are known to follow the Kanuni i Malësisë së Madhë, a variant of the Kanun.

=== Krasniqi ===
The Krasniqi tribal territory is situated in the District of Tropoja, north of the Drin River from Fierza eastwards to the district of Has. It borders Montenegro to the north, the Nikaj and Mërturi tribes to the west, the Bytyqi to the southeast and the Gashi to the northeast. The Krasniqi traditionally consisted of two bajraks; Dragobia in the Valbona Valley, and Bujan (between Bajram Curri and Fierza). They were believed to have arrived in their present region sometime after 1600, driving the Gashi eastwards and the Thaçi westwards, and the tribe can be traced to a common ancestor by the name of Kolë Mekshi. Their settlements within the Gjakova Highlands include:

- Bajram Curri (Kolgecaj)
- Bujan
- Shoshan
- Kocanaj
- Dragobia
- Bradoshnicë
- Degë
- Dushaj
- Llugaj
- Margegaj
- Lëkurtaj
- Gri
- Selimaj (Gegëhysen)
- Valbonë

=== Gashi ===
The Gashi tribal territory is situated eastwards of Bajram Curri in the District of Tropoja to the western parts of the District of Gjakova. Much of their tribal territory corresponds to the Llugaj and Bushtrica river valleys. They border the Krasniqi to the west and the Bytyqi to the south, over the Luzha Pass (Qafa e Luzhës), and they possessed summer pasturelands east of Vuthaj in present-day Montenegro. The Gashi were the first Northern Albanian tribe to have lived in the Highlands of Gjakova. In 1690, Mahmut Pasha Begollii expelled most of the tribe, forcing them to relocate to the Llap region, leaving only the village of Luzha behind. According to local legend, the Gashi tribe took its current form in the Highlands of Gjakova when the Aga of the Gashi in Botushë united Luzha with the bajraks of Bardhi and Shipshan. This alliance was created as a protective measure against neighboring tribes, which were larger in number. Their settlements within the Gjakova Highlands include:

- Ahmataj (Shushicë-Ahmataj)
- Babina
- Begaj
- Berbat (Shkëlzen)
- Botushë
- Buçin
- Gegaj
- Kernaja
- Kovaç
- Luzha
- Mejdan
- Papaj
- Tropoja
- Viçidol

=== Bytyqi ===
The Bytyqi tribal territory is situated in the southeastern Gjakova Highlands. It borders Gashi to the northwest, Krasniqi to the southwest, Hasi to the south and Morina to the east. Bytyqi territory consists of a plain surrounded by low hills and the high mountain pastures of Sylbica. The tribe traces their lineage back to the ancestral father Lekë Bytyqi, who initially hailed from the area around Koman, but another similar legend traces them back to the Shkreli tribe. Their settlements within the Gjakova Highlands include:

- Pac
- Zherkë
- Çorraj
- Leniq
- Kam
- Kepenek
- Viliq (Çorr-Velaj)
- Vlad
- Bregut të Vladit
- Çorroj
- Mash
- Prush
- Visoça
- Zogaj

=== Nikaj ===
The Nikaj tribal territory is situated north of the Drin River and in the present-day western parts of the District of Tropoja. It borders Shala to the west, Krasniqja to the north and east and Mërturi to the south. They live primarily on the western side of the Curraj/Nikaj river. They trace their origins to the ancestral father Nikë Mekshi, a herdsman from Krasniqi who left at around 1550-1600 and settled in presently Nikaj territory, where they replaced the local Mavriqi tribe. Their settlements within the Gjakova Highlands include:

- Lekbibaj
- Gjonpepaj
- Peraj
- Curraj i Eperm
- Curraj i Poshtem
- Qeresh
- Kuq

=== Mërturi ===
The Mërturi tribal territory is situated north and south of the Drin River, west of Fierza in the Districts of Tropoja and Puka. It borders Shoshi to the west, Nikaj to the north, Krasniqi and Thaçi to the east, Berisha to the south and Toplana to the southwest. The tribe traces their origins to the ancestral father Lek Poga, brother to the ancestral father of the Berisha - Kol Poga - and as such were considered one tribe. The Mërturi would separate 1520 and move northwards to their current regions. Their settlements within the Gjakova Highlands include:

- Bregluma
- Apripa
- Tetaj
- Mërtur
- Brisë
- Palc
- Salca
- Kotec
- Bëtosha
- Shengjergj
- Garas
- Rajë

=== Morina ===
The Morina tribal territory is situated along the current Albania-Kosovo border. It borders Gashi to the north and west, Bytyqi to the southwest and Hasi to the south. Their territory is mostly within Kosovo, corresponding to Qafë Morinë, the village of Morinë itself within Kosovo and the surrounding areas. They are believed to trace common origin with the Mirdita tribe, who in turn trace their origins to the Pashtrik Mountain on the Kosovo-Albanian border. It is likely the Morina tribe remained in the area whilst the Mirdita tribe migrated westwards.

=== Berisha ===
Aside from the local tribes and native families that originate from the Highlands of Gjakova, some inhabitants descend from other Albanian tribes. These include the Berisha; the members of the Berisha tribe in the Gjakova Highlands are also known as the Berisha e Brigjeve to distinguish them from the Berisha of Pukë. Geographically, they have traditionally inhabited the southern parts of the Gjakova Highlands, namely in three villages - Mash-Rushtë, Rodogosh and Visoçë. Some descendants of the Berisha tribe live in the central Gjakova Highlands, namely in Viçidol.

== Toponomy ==
In total, around 75% of the etymologies for local microtoponomy onomastics in the Gjakova Highlands originate from the Albanian language, whereas around 12% come from a synthesised Albanian-foreign language compound - that is, one aspect of the terminology being Albanian and the other aspect originating from a foreign language. Around 8% of microtoponomy onomastics come from a Slavic language origin, 5% come from a Latin/Turkish/Greek language origin, although some are of uncertain origin. In regards to macrotoponomy, around 64% originates from the Albanian language, 21% from Slavic languages, 9% from a mixed Albanian-foreign origin and 6% from an either Latin/Greek/Aromanian/unclear language origin.

== Culture ==
As with any ethnographic region, the Highlands of Gjakova have their own unique aspects of Albanian culture and linguistics.

=== Women's Clothing ===
Women's clothing has greater diversity than the men's clothing does. The main forms of clothing are the prevalent wide skirts known as pështjellak të gjanë, tight clothing, laced clothing with scarves (as is typical to the Lumi i Keq - or Reka - region in Kosovo) and the xhubleta. The decorative ornaments on women's clothing for women is less striking than the ornamental decorations on textiles that are not worn, but the appearance of the clothing is particularly impressive when the rubat (a complex ornamental headscarf), qafshokat (waist-scarfs) and the riza (two large red folded scars) are placed on both sides of the skirt. The rubat is mostly unicoloured, but it can vary, and women's aprons covering the front waist area are traditionally decorated in the corners (which remains uncovered by the midriff scarf). In the areas of Zogaj, Kamenica, Luguizi, Padesh and Zherkë, women's clothing contains similar elements to that of the Lumi i Keq (or Reka) region (which runs from Gjakova itself to the Highlands of Gjakova), as well as with the rest of the Plains of Dukagjin. Below is a description of the four main types of women's clothing:

- The wide skirt outfit, known as pështjellak i gjanë, consists of a rubat, as well as qafshokat and riza on the sides of the pleated skirt over a short braided fabric that had varying chest embroidery to the sleeves. A large yellow silk scarf was tied to the middle of the skirt. The belt known as shoka was located in the midsection. A vest, waistcoat, long woollen socks that reached the knees and traditional Albanian shoes called opinga were also worn. This outfit is near identical to that worn by the women of the Kabashi tribeswomen of the Puka region.
- The tight outfit of the Gjakova Highlands consists of a rubat, a long shirt over woven fabrics with either a certain type of vest, known as mitan pa krahë or krahoçe, or a tehri wire-decorated vest. The woollen front apron, or pështjellak, is of a trapezoidal shape, and is larger than the woollen back apron. The qafshokat and riza are also used on both sides of the skirt. Wool socks are worn, as well as jewellery and the like. This particular outfit is common in the Rugova region as well.
- The lace and scarf clothing, or lidhcë e merhame, is the typical clothing of the Bytyqi tribeswomen as well as the Albanian women of the Lumi i Keq region that runs from the city of Gjakova to the highlands. The main aspect is the lidhcë e merhame, the head cover or scarf; the head of the lidhcë is linked downwards towards the chin like a pillow (vatinë), and the purpose is to shape a more attractive head form. This outfit contains a long loom-woven shirt with either beige, brown (dyed with alder or walnut) or white stemming. There is a simplistic slit and collar by the end of the chest, and numerous, asymmetrical ornamental motives are found on either side of said slit. The front pështjellak (apron) is bigger than the back one; the pështjellakët are decorated, and motifs are easily observable on dark backgrounds. They are generally situated on the sides of the pështjellak, and are decorated on the lower parts with hooks, or shtiza. A velvet green, blue or brown vest called mitani is also worn, and is decorated with kllapedan (threads of gold and silver) and tehri colours. The vest, or jeleku, is decorated with kllapedan, lace and tehri colours; the forearm sleeves on this vest variant are embroidered with asymmetrical motifs. Woollen long black socks are worn up to the knee with decoration. The leather shoes are decorated with colours in the upper section.
- The xhubleta is a sleeveless, thick and sturdy black felt drees. The Nikaj and Mërturi tribeswomen wore a xhubletë with a shirt and a waistcoat (krahol, kërdhokull), a vest with fringe, a silver belt, a front apron pështjellakët, leather shoes with black wool socks, a handkerchief with fringe and silver adornments. The xhubleta is particularly noticeable due to its decorative colours and motifs - in Nikaj-Mërtur, they are traditionally decorated with sun and moon symbols, floral or animal motifs, snakes/serpents and more. For young girls, the xhubleta is white and black.

=== Men's Clothing ===
Men's clothing in the Gjakova Highlands are characterised by the tirq - white felt pants that fit tightly around the legs that were sometimes brown (after which they'd be called Galana) or black. A vest, or jelek, is also worn, as well as a white felt doublet, or xhamadan, and cloaks known as gujën. The cloaks are traditionally made from white felt decorated with black braiding. Men's clothing traditionally compose of the following pieces:

- Tirq: The tirq are white pants that can be white or brown and dark (galana), that are made with pieces of wool in the loom. They extend to the valanicë, which are pressed and taken back in the soutane zhgun. They are tied slightly underneath the middle of the body (kopaçë) with a lace that is inserted into a hole in the top part. Below the front part of the kopaçve are two empty spaces, or shkekë, they are cut and sewn according to the body. The cloth curves on the bow of the legs, beginning with the lower empty spaces which are sewed back. The bottom parts are endowed with 3-12 threads piping yarn, depending on the wearer's economic situation and position in society.
- Shirts: The shirts are made of cloth that is woven on a loom. They can be white, beige, striped (brick-coloured stripes), brown etc. They are long-sleeved with a simple military-form colour and an open top. They are usually slightly embroidered with white thread (white thread on white shirts) in symmetrical ways at the end of the sleeves towards the wrist.
- Mitan: The mitan is a black velvet long-sleeved vest that is decorated with lace ornaments on the sides of the sleeves and collar. The lace ornaments can be of maroon, violet or brown colours. They contain buttons, or kamcana, on both left and right sides of the front.
- Xhamadan: The xhamadan is a doublet with a variety of colours, ranging from red, maroon, brown, blue and more, with long and open sleeves. It is decorated with piping, tehri and kllapedan - which is gold and silver thread.
- Vest: The vests compose of sheets of black cloth. They are decorated and framed with tehri. They are short, with round buttons called sumbulla, and made with braid, tehri and kllapedan.
- Shokë e shallë: The shokë e shallë are known in English as the belt and scarves respectively. The belt, or shoka, is made of wool with a loom, and is decorated with dyed wool yarn. They are horizontally patterned and very colourful. It is very long and is wrapped several times around the midbody section. The scarves, or shallë, are also long (generally the same length as the shoka) and are wrapped around each other from the midbody downwards to the two empty spaces within the tirq, or the shtjeka.
- Plis: The plis is a spherical, round hat that is worn atop the head. It is a symbol of the Albanians. Within the Gjakova Highlands, the plis is sometimes surrounded by a handkerchief (which may be black or white), whereas the Nikaj-Mërturi tribesmen use red handkerchiefs. In Valbona and Çerem, as well as in other regions of northern Albania (such as the Rugova region near Peja), the plis is wrapped with a white cotton scarf, merhamë or shallë, that loops around the head and chin.
- Opinga: The Opinga are leather shoes that are either knitted above with white thread or twined with leather using decorations. Woollen white socks were made with more finesse, using coloured string for different symbolic motifs.
- Stoli: Stoli refers to ornaments; in this particular outfit there are various ornaments used from the sheath of the cloak that hangs on the neck and curves down in the men's chest. Cigarette holders are decorated with amber. Silver jewellery are also present, and decorated artisanal weapons are kept around the waist.
- Young Boys: The clothing of young boys in the Gjakova Highlands are similar to that of the men, but they are more simple. Rather than colourful decorations, everything is white. The shirt collars are of military form, and the shirts themselves embroidered and decorated with light-coloured motifs on the sleeves, collar and joints. Woollen long-sleeved shirts of a natural wool colour, decorated with different motifs, are also used. White doublets and coarse woollen cloth shirts are also worn, and they usually have simple decorations and lacing on the sides. White tirq, waist scarves, wool socks and opinga are worn.

== Notable Figures ==
- Bajram Curri, Albanian chieftain, politician and activist, Krasniqi tribe.
- Binak Alia, Albanian leader, rebel and fighter born in Bujan, Krasniqi tribe.
- Fatime Sokoli, Albanian folk music singer born in Dragobi, near Margegaj, Krasniqi tribe.
- Jashar Salihu - Hero of Kosovo recipient, Albanian diplomat, activist and general born in Botushë, Gashi tribe.
- Haxhi Zeka, Albanian nationalist leader born in Shoshan, Krasniqi tribe.
- Mic Sokoli, Albanian nationalist figure and guerrilla fighter from Fang, near Bujan, Krasniqi tribe.
- Ndoc Nikaj, Albanian priest, writer, and historian, Nikaj tribe.
- Shpend Dragobia, Albanian chieftain, rebel and fighter born in Margegaj, Krasniqi tribe.
- Sulejman Aga Botusha, Albanian leader, rebel and fighter from Botushë, Gashi tribe.
- Tahir Sinani, Albanian martyr, commander in the KLA, KPC, LAPMB and the NLA, born in Gri, Krasniqi tribe.
