= Brisë =

- Village
- Location within Albania
- Coordinates: 42°18′N 19°56′E
- Country: Albania
- County: Kukës
- Municipality: Tropojë
- Administrative unit: Lekbibaj
- Time zone: UTC+1 (CET)
  - Summer (DST): UTC+2 (CEST)

Brisë is a village in the administrative unit of Lekbibaj in Kukës County, Albania. It is situated in the ethnographic region known as the Highlands of Gjakova. Brisë is a settlement within Nikaj tribal territory, and it is therefore inhabited by members of the Nikaj tribe.

The etymology of the village's name comes from the Albanian word brinjë (meaning 'horns'), and was recorded in 1485 under the name Brisha. It is one of the outermost villages of the Gjakova Highlands, bordering the Dukagjin Highlands to the west and north.
