= Mërturi =

Historic Albanian tribe

The Mërturi are an historical Albanian tribe (fis) and region in the Highlands of Gjakova of north Albania. The Mërturi tribe is a traditional fis in the sense of being a community that claims paternal descent from one common ancestor, consisting of a single bajrak (military-administrative unit) during the time of the Ottoman Empire. The Mërturi are directly related to the Berisha tribe. Today, the Mërturi are usually grouped along with the Nikaj tribe as Nikaj-Mërturi.

== Geography ==
Mërturi tribal territory is positioned on both banks of the River Drin, specifically in the District of Tropoja and the District of Puka. It borders the Nikaj to the north, the Krasniqi and the Thaçi to the east, the Shoshi to the west, the Berisha to the south and the Toplana to the southwest. Their main settlements are Raja (now Bregluma), Tetaj, Apripa, Mërtur, Brisë and Palç.

== History and origins ==
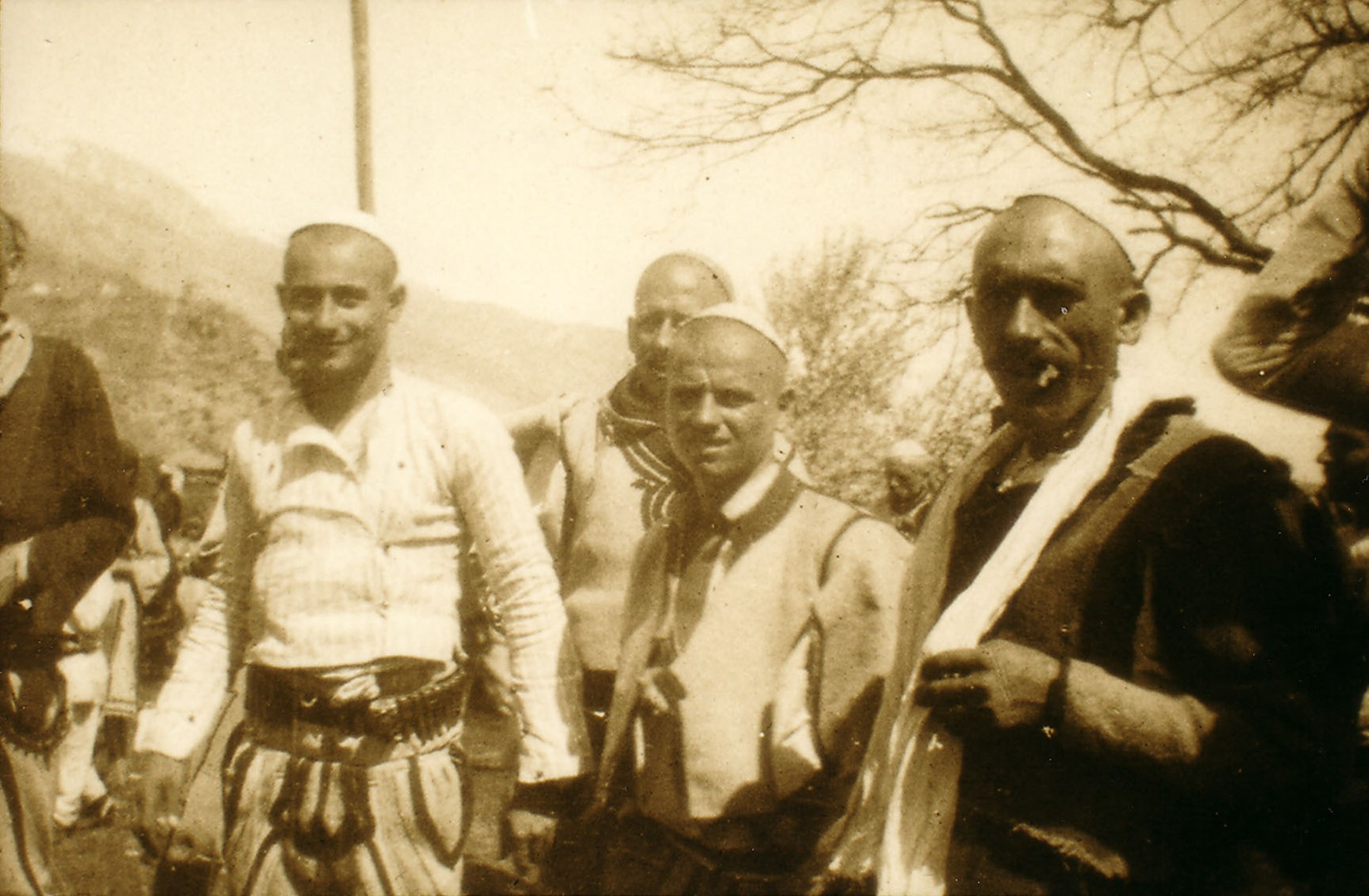
Mërturi men photographed by Franz Nopcsa.

The tribe was first recorded as the 'Marturi' in an ecclesiastical report in 1629. It was placed under the dominion of the Zotni of Pukë (zotni meaning 'lord' in Albanian) in around 1630. In 1881, the tribe consisted of 13 villages with 242 homes and 3,500 inhabitants, 700 of which were men fit for arms. The tribe consisted of a bajraktar (chieftain) since at least 1877, and therefore a single bajrak (military administrative unit). In 1892, the bajrak consisted of 213 homes. Due to being part of the Gjakova Highlands, the tribe was subject to the kaymakam of Gjakova. In 1918, an Austro-Hungarian survey recorded the Mërturi tribe as having 354 households with a total of 2,211 inhabitants.

The ancestral father of the Mërturi tribe was called Lek Poga, the son of Pog Murri and therefore the grandson of Murr Deti/Murr Dedi. Lek Poga's brother, Kol Poga, was the ancestral father of the Berisha tribe. According to folklore, Lek Poga would have five sons who would settle in parts of the Mërturi tribal territory and whose descendants would establish their own settlements - Bib Leka in Raja, Mulaj and Shëngjergj; Ndre Leka in Palç, Apripa and Mërturi i Gurit; Mar Leka in Salca and Brisë; Tet Leka in Tetaj, Bëtosha and Markaj; and Pec Leka in Bëtosha.

The Mërturi and the Berisha separated into two different tribes in 1520, and the Mërturi moved northwards into the Highlands of Gjakova, arriving firstly in an infertile and rocky region known as Straziç. Eventually, the Mërturi managed to expel the Toplana tribe from the more fertile areas and created a settlement in the area in 1556 at the base of Mount Korja. In 1590, they settled in Brisë and some areas south of the Drin River, and eventually separated into two groups 1650, settling on the southern and north-western slopes of Mount Korja. By the early 20th century, the Mërturi were separated into three parts; the southern Mërturi, the north-western Mërturi, and the north-eastern Mërturi. The southern Mërturi, also known as Mërturi i Gurit ('Mërturi of the rocks' in Albanian), were situated south of the Drin on the slopes of Mount Shllum. The north-western Mërturi were situated on the slopes of Mount Ershell, and the north-eastern Mërturi (the original Mërturi) were situated north of the Drin on the slopes of Mount Korja. Members of the Mërturi tribe have migrated in particular to the Dushkaja region in Kosovo, and one of the major Mërturi families in Gjakova is said to be descended from the founders of the city itself. Edith Durham noted that Gjakova was founded by members of the Mërturi tribe in the 15th-16th centuries, specifically by the families of two men descended from Bitush Mërturi - Vula and Mërtur. The descendants of the Vula family were still present during the time of her visit to Albania in the first decade of the 20th century.

In 1862, the Ottomans sent Maxharr Pasha with 12 divisions to implement the Tanzimat Reforms in the Highlands of Gjakova. Under the leadership of Mic Sokoli and Binak Alia, the tribes of Krasniqi, Gashi, Bytyçi and Nikaj alongside the Mërturi organized a resistance near Bujan. The rebels were reinforced by the forces of Shala, led by Mark Lula. After heavy fighting, they managed to defeat the Ottoman force and expel them from the highlands.

== Relations with other tribes ==
Aside from being related to the Berisha tribe, the Mërturi are on good terms with the Nikaj tribe, so much so that they are generally grouped together as the Nikaj-Mërturi. The Nikaj-Mërturi were in conflict with the Shala and Shoshi tribes of the Dukagjin Highlands, and they were also known for having skirmishes and armed conflict with the Krasniqi tribe of the Gjakova Highlands. The Nikaj-Mërturi would have to pass through Krasniqi tribal territory in order to go to their market town, Gjakova, and so they would set off as a large group on Friday mornings and return on Monday. The Mërturi tribe were also in conflict with the Toplana, due to the Mërturi having expelled the Toplana from Straziç, and armed conflict commonly occurred between the two tribes.

The three historical divisions of the Mërturi tribe were also somewhat independent of each other, with the southern Mërturi not even attending tribal gatherings. When the Toplana made Besa - or a sacred pledge - with the north-western Mërturi (Salca), the Besa did not apply to the southern Mërturi, or Mërturi i Gurit, and so the southern Mërturi were required to make their own ceasefires with the Toplana.

== Religion ==
The Mërturi are a predominantly Catholic tribe, with the tribe's patron saint being the Virgin Mary, or Zoja e Mërturit ('Our Lady of Mërturi' in Albanian). Her feast day is on 7-8 September. Franciscans first visited the Mërturi region in 1636, and settled in the community in 1755. In 1835, they constructed the parish church of Mërturi in Raja (Breglumi) upon a cliff overlooking the right bank of the Drin river, and it was dedicated to Saint Veneranda. In the early 20th century, the Mërturi also consisted of around 100-200 Muslims. In certain cases, both Catholics and Muslims are present in a single family.

== See also ==
- Nikaj-Mërtur region
