= Ndoc Mark Gega =

Albanian patriot

Ndoc Mark Gega (c. 1830 – 1908?) or Noc Mark Deda is an Albanian patriot who attained legendary status for his heroic resistance against Turkish and Serb invading forces, according to local lore.

Gega was born in Berishë, Pukë, into a family with a steadfast commitment to resisting occupiers. In 1908, following the Young Turks' ascent to power in Albania, they conducted thorough searches for arms in Albanian homes. Gega, along with his brothers Gjergj and Mehil, staunchly refused to surrender their weapons. For two months, Gega, together with highlanders (Malesor), defended their territories in the mountains against Turkish forces.

== Resistance ==
According to legend, Gega's home was besieged when he resisted Turkish forces during a nighttime encounter. A fierce battle ensued, resulting in the death of Gega's father, Mark Deda. Mehil was wounded, and Gjergj became crippled after being struck in the arm by a bullet. The fighting persisted until morning, during which Gega managed to eliminate the Turkish commander but was wounded in the process. As news of the conflict spread, other Albanians joined the fray, and the battle extended to the "Lisi i Lekes" region.

Assisted by Koc Marku and Mehmet Doci, Gega escaped his besieged home and crossed the Drin River at Toplana. Wounded, they found refuge in a cave now known as the "Cave of Ndoc Mark Gega," enduring the harsh winter. Gega's father was laid to rest by neighboring patriots, adhering to the ceremonies of the time. The brothers remained in the cave for three months.

In subsequent clashes, Gega and his compatriots, including Gjelosh Kecani, the Koliku and Mehil Brothers, Tom Karoli, and Koc Marku, successfully repelled Turkish forces from Qyqesh heading towards Berishe. Simultaneously, Serb forces invaded the Dukagjini region, prompting Gega and his brothers to join the Malësors in resisting the invaders. Following intense battles in Shala and Shoshi, Gega and his brothers found themselves surrounded by Serb forces, resulting in the death of his brothers and 13 other group members. Despite being wounded, Gega managed to eliminate the Serb commander. Returning home, Gega succumbed to his wounds.
