= Murr Dedi =

Mythical Albanian figure

Murr Dedi, also referred to as Murr Deti, is a mysterious figure in Albanian history which is claimed to be the progenitor of various different tribes including the Shoshi, Mirdita, Berisha, Mërturi and Shala tribes. His name and folklore have brought up many theories surrounding his origins and nature, yet there are no conclusions which may be definitevley drawn.

== Name ==
The name of Murr Dedi has multiple theories of its own. The first name may refer to Albanian murr, "dark, gloomy". This is put together with Dedi, which may be the name of the figures father, following Albanian naming tradition, or may come from a word such as dedë, "ancestor, progenitor". Similar words are seen in multiple other languages, such as Serbo-Croatian djed, "grandfather", and Turkish dede, "grandfather", both of which are thought to come from different sources. The term is found widespread through the Slavic languages, and is found in Greek as τήθη (tḗthē), "grandmother", and in Latvian dȩ̀ds, "old man".

All these terms may derive from a Proto-Indo-European root *dʰeh₁(y)- "to suckle".

Another popular idea regarding the second component, Dedi, has it being a variant of the Albanian word det, "sea". This is mainly due to the fact that tribal stories of Murr Dedi's origins claim he arrived from the sea, or was found near it. Some have believed the name "Murr Dedi" may in fact be a translation of the Black Sea, and that the tribes had come from that region, possibly being Thracian in origin. However, there is no evidence for this.

Multiple accounts claim the name Murr to derive from place names like Mamurras, Mahmurrëzë, and other similar names along the coast, which leads to the surname Deti/Dedi. The origins of these place names are uncertain.

Dedë is also seen as a personal name throughout northern Albania, as well as in forms such as Ded, Dod, Dodë, and more. Dedalije also appears as the name of a mythical hero who kills the Katallân, a giant cyclops.

== Tribal Ancestry ==
Murr Dedi is considered to be the forefather of many large tribes in northern Albania. The one of which is the tribe of Berisha, which claims to descend from Kol Poga, son of Pog Murri, son of Murr Dedi. Historically, it is believed that Kol Poga's brother was Lekë Poga, who was then the forefather of the Mërturi tribe. Genetically, the tribe of Berisha and Mërturi are considered to be related patrilineally, which may support this oral tradition.

However, three different tribe also claim descent from Murr Dedi, though from another one of his sons, Dit Miri, alleged brother of Pog Murri, ancestor of Berisha and Mërturi. Dit Miri is the father of Mir Diti, who is the forefather of the tribe of Mirdita. Mir Diti's brothers are considered to be the forefathers of two other tribes, Shala and Shoshi. Murr Dedi was also the progenitor of the Thaçi and Toplana tribes. However, while the other tribes do claim descent from a common male ancestor, Thaçi and Mirdita do not, as they come from a union of different families. So, while some members may be related to the other tribes, the entire tribes themselves are not descended from Murr Dedi, according to tradition.

== Mythical Origins ==
The origins of Murr Dedi have been retold various times by different people. Although they may differ considerably, the stories mainly have a few shared traits. These include coming from the sea, living somewhere in Northern Albania, and having his descendants expand and conquer.

=== Toka e Kreut ===
One story, from the tribe of Berisha, claims that there was once a land known as "Toka e Kreut", whose location is unknown. Toka e Kreut is said to have been completely surrounded by water, and it was a catastrophic flood which caused a few men to take their boats and search for new lands. The men had sailed until their ora (a white dove) directed them towards a land abundant with pear trees. The men stayed there for nine generations until war broke out, and then began expanding. The founder of the tribe of Berisha was then called "Murr Dedi" as he came from the sea. This story was told by the four elders of Desk, Doç, Tetë, and Marojë.

=== Strange Boy and the Sheep ===
An oral legend from the tribe of Berisha finds similarities to the Roman myth of Romulus and Remus. The story tells of a shepherd near the shores of Mahmurrëzë who had his sheep grazing the pastures. One of the sheep, however, and for no apparent reason, seemed to have already been milked. One day, when the sheep were grazing, the man observed this one sheep again, as he had become very curious as to what had happened, and he had seen it start to wander off on its own, separating from the rest of the flock. The shepherd followed it from a distance, and he then saw the sheep go to a baby boy swaddled in a cradle. To his amaze, he saw the sheep feeding the baby its milk. The shepherd then went to the baby and saw that he was totally alone with nobody nearby. He took the boy and raised him as his own, and named him Mahmurr Deti, as he was found near the sea of Mahmurrëzë. Mahmurr Deti had grown and had children of his own, and then became the progenitor of the tribe of Berisha, who then called him Murr Dedi for short. This story has clear relations to the story of Romulus and Remus, as the two boys were babies which were cared for by a she-wolf, which gave them its milk. This story may share common origins, or be the origin of the Albanian story itself.

=== Bishop's Granddaughter ===
A story from Berishë Vendi (1962) mentions that a man from the sea had fallen in love with the granddaughter of a bishop in Krujë, who was of a noble family. This man had gotten the bishop's granddaughter pregnant, and when the bishop found out, he ordered for the abortion of the baby. However, the nuns helped the woman give birth, and one of them took the baby to her own family in Kurbin and Skurraj. The baby boy was named Murr Deti as he was born in Mamurras and his father came from the sea. When the bishop had heard of the boy's birth, he had feared the boy would one day claim his wealth and titles. The noble family had sought to kill the boy but failed after the boy had escaped to northward to Vau i Dejës where he grew, married, and had children of his own, and he eventually settled on the banks of the river Drin.

=== History of his Descendants ===
Aside from the history of Murr Dedi, there are also oral stories of his sons and their descendants. After arriving from the sea in a region known as Mamurras, the tribe moved to Vau i Dejës, a region near Shkodra, due to warfare. Kojel (head of the Berisha) and Lekë Pogu, son of Pog Murri, son of Murr Dedi, moved to Gralishtë and expelled the Latin speakers from Iballë. Their territory was named after them, Berishë, and the tribe began to split and grow into what it is today.

Another story involved the ancestors of Mirdita, Shala, and Shoshi. Mir Diti, son of Dit Miri, son of Murr Deti, was the brother of Zog Diti, father of the Shoshi tribe, and Mark Diti, father of the Shala tribe. When the brothers Zog and Mark were to separate from Mir, both going on their own paths, Mir Diti had gifted Mark a shalë, "saddle", and Zog a shoshë, "sieve". In another tradition, the ancestor of the Shala is named as Zog Diti, the son of Dit Murri and grandson of Murr Dedi. Likewise, in this tradition the Shala appear as patrilineal kin with the Shoshi and Mirdita, formed by Zog's brothers Mark and Mir Diti.

== Geography ==
In northern Albania, such as Dibër and surrounding areas, multiple locations seem to bear names similar to the name of Murr. These include Muhurr (village), Qafë-Murrë (mountain), Murrë (village), Mamurras (village), Fushë-Mamurras, and Fushë-Muhurr.

== Notes ==
- Elsie, Robert (2015). The Tribes of Albania: History, Society and Culture. I.B.Tauris. ISBN 978-1-78453-401-1.
- Galaty, Michael L.; Lafe, Ols; Lee, Wayne E.; Tafilica, Zamir (April 2013). Light and Shadow: Isolation and Interaction in the Shala Valley of Northern Albania. Cotsen Institute of Archaeology Press. ISBN 978-1-931745-71-0.
  - Lee, Wayne; Lubin, Matthew; Ndreca, Eduard. "Chapter Four: Archival Historical Research". In Galaty et al. (2013), pp. 45–84.
- Pjetri, Nikoll. Studime Historike "Familja e Lashtë e Berishës".
- Malaj, Ibrahim Kadri (2003). Tropoja në Breza: monografi. Dardania.
- Kaser, Karl (1992). Hirten, Kämpfer, Stammeshelden: Ursprünge und Gegenwart des balkanischen Patriarchats. Vienna, Austria: Böhlau Verlag Wien. ISBN 978-3-205-05545-7.
- Papleka, Ndoc (January 1, 1988). Dedalia dhe Katallani. Shtëpia Botuese "Naim Frashëri".
- Rix, Helmut (2001). Lexikon der indogermanischen Verben [Lexicon of Indo-European Verbs] (in German) (2nd ed.). Dr. Ludwig Reichert Verlag. ISBN 3-89500-219-4.
- https://rrenjet.com/
