= Berisha (tribe) =

Region in Albania; historic Albanian tribe

Coordinates: 42°09′N 19°54′E

- Location: Pukë, Tropoja, Kosovo, Montenegro
- Descended from: Murr Dedi
- Branches: Berisha; Berisha e Bardhë; Mërturi; Arrëni; Mangjolli

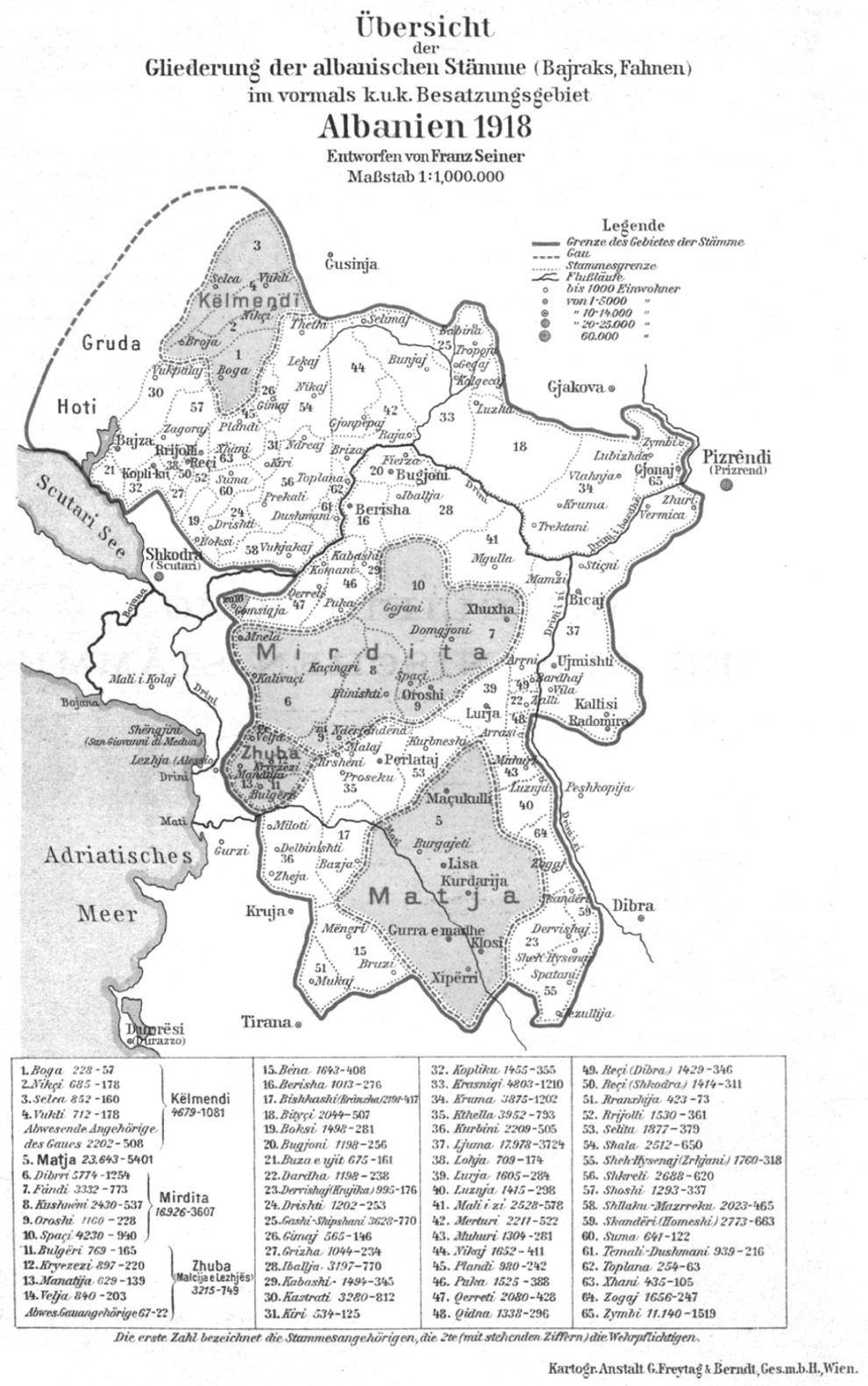
Albanian bajraks (1918). Berisha is numbered 16.

Berisha is a historical Albanian tribe (fis) and region in Pukë, northern Albania. Berisha is one of the oldest documented Albanian tribes, first recorded in 1242 in Dulcigno. In the Middle Ages, it was widely spread across northern Albania, southern Montenegro and Kosovo. People who traced their origin to Berisha are also found in the coastal trading hubs of Dalmatia in the Middle Ages. Berisha formed its own territorial community in Pukë in the course of the 14th century.

In the apex of feudal development in Albania at the end of the 13th and during the long 14th century, Berisha was in a process of de-tribalization and reorganization of some branches as feudal families. This process stopped in the wake of the Ottoman conquest of the Balkans in the 15th century and was followed by a strengthening of tribal and kinship ties in the region. Berisha of Pukë is a Catholic fis. In the Ottoman period, brotherhoods (vllazni) from Puka settled in parts of Tropojë, some areas of Kosovo and Skopska Crna Gora in Macedonia. These branches converted to Islam starting from the 18th century onwards. The surname Berisha is common in Puka, Tropoja and Kosovo.

== Geography ==
The historical tribal area of the Berisha is located in the Pukë district, south of the Drin, west of Fierza, in northern Albania. The centre is the Sapaç river basin, flowing into the Drin. Berisha traditionally borders with Dushmani and Toplana to the west, Bugjoni to the north, Iballë to the east and Kabashi to the south. The main settlements are Berisha e Vogël (Lower Berisha), Shopël and Berisha e Epërme (Upper Berisha). Its inhabitants are called Berishas. In terms of administrative division, Berisha is part of the Iballë municipal unit of Fushë-Arrëz.

== Origins ==
Oral traditions and fragmentary stories were collected and interpreted by writers who travelled in the region in the 19th century about the early history of the Berisha tribe. Since then, analysis of recorded historical material, linguistics and comparative anthropology have resulted in more historically grounded accounts. Of particular importance is the archival research of Lajos Thallóczy, who found the first historical record of Berisha in the archives of the Republic of Ragusa in 1242. His work allowed for further archival research. Thus, in the following years Baron Nopcsa traced the ancestry of Berisha with certainty back to 1370 and formulated a probable lineage as far back as 1270.

Edith Durham, Baron Nopcsa and others recorded the most widely known oral tradition about the origin of Berisha, which is also part of the tradition of all other tribes in the area. According to it, the tribe's first direct ancestor is Kol Poga, son of Pog Murri, son of Murr Dedi. Kol Poga's brother was Lekë Poga, ancestor of Mërturi. Pog Murri's brother was Dit Murri, ancestor of Shala, Shoshi and Mirdita. The grandfather of Kol Poga, Berisha's ancestor, Murr Dedi was also the progenitor of the Thaçi and Toplana tribes. Berisha of Pukë form four brotherhoods, all of whom trace their origin to Kol Poga: Tetaj (Teta), Maroj (Poga), Deskaj (Desku), Doçaj (Doçi).

In Montenegro, Marko Miljanov from Kuči wrote in his book about his home region that the Kuči and Berisha were "regarded close", allegedly because the Berisha ancestors settled from Kuči; Konstantin Jireček further recorded about this story that Old Kuči (Staro Kuči), which placed a Grča, son of Nenad as its ancestor also placed him as an ancestor of the Berisha tribe. On the contrary, in Berisha it is believed that Old Kuči itself descends from Berisha and is called Berisha i Kuq (Red Berisha) as opposed to Berisha of Pukë, Mërturi and a part of Piperi that traces its origin from Berisha, who are collectively called Berisha i Bardh (White Berisha). In historical record, Berisha and the Old Kuči appear in different areas and timelines as Old Kuči formed part of the tribe of current Kuči, which was based on different ancestral groups in the late 15th century . Nevertheless, if not kin by blood, Montenegrin and Albanian tribes regarded closeness in original or home territory from where someone "came". Therefore, Serbian geographer Andrija Jovićević put forward the narrative that the Kuči were "kin" to Kastrati, Berisha and Kelmendi because their distant ancestor once, ostensibly, settled in the same general area as Kuči.

In later times, one brotherhood of Kuči, the Drekaloviči traced their descent to Berisha. In turn, from them a part of the Kastrati trace their origin. Thus, these groups have the custom of avoiding intermarriage with each other. In Koja e Kuçit, a Catholic Albanian tribe, sometimes classified as part of the wider Kuči region, the Pali brotherhood stems from Berisha and settled in that area around 1500. This brotherhood is considered part of Red Berisha.

Another brotherhood in modern Montenegro that is taken to be kin with the tribe is the Vušović brotherhood from Velika near Plav. In Luma, the Arrëni tribe is an offshoot of the Berisha. In general, brotherhoods from Berisha are widespread in north-eastern Albania. The Berisha of Tropojë who form three brotherhoods: Isufmemaj, Halilaj, Papaj in the Ottoman period were part of the same bajrak as Kojeli, who are from Mërturi and thus kin to Berisha.

== History ==
The earliest documented ancestor of the Berisha tribe is "Count Valentine Berissa of Ulqin/Nobilibus Viris Dulcinensibus Berissa Comitis" mentioned in a Ragusan document in 1242. Ragusan archives mention as early as the 13th century; Piçinegus de Berrisina (1278), Petrus de Berisna (1280-1304), his brother Laurentius de Berisna (1280-1304), as well as Piçinegus Pasque de Berrissina, Grubessa de Berisina, Blasius de Berrisina, Pasque de Grubessa de Brissina. Dominko Berisha is mentioned as a mason who worked in the city of Trogir in 1264. In December 1274, a treaty was signed between the Anjou governor Norjan de Toucy and Albanian nobles, recognising Charles the first as their overlord. One of the signitaries was "Sevasto Tanussio Berissa" In the Dečani chrysobulls 1330, members of this tribe as mentioned as "Sokalnik". A member of the Berisha tribe was appointed as a bishop in the city of Ragusa from the Archbishop of Ragusa in 1342–44. Throughout Kosovo numerous toponyms can be found during the 14th century such as Berishin Dol, Berishtar, Berishofc, Berishtani, Berishane and Berishiç. In 1348, Emperor Stefan Dušan mentions "Berisha's Field" as being near Mushtisht in Kosovo.

In the Venetian cadastre of Shkodra in 1416–17, the Catholic cleric Dom Marin Berisha and Pelin Berisha are mentioned as landowners near modern Bërdicë in the location Surlea. In 1434 Paliç Berisha (Paulich Berich) is mentioned as a debtor in the books of a Ragusan merchant in Novo Brdo. In the Ottoman Defter of 1455, Branka and Radonja Berisha from Gjelekar are found. In Grabovc (Vushtrri) and Bród (Ferizaj) from the Berisha tribe : Vladislav and Stepan, sons of Berisha and other members of their kin are mentioned. In 1467, the Berisha Tribe (Berixasthorum) signed a contract with the Republic of Venice, where the representative of the tribe Helias Bossi was granted the flag of Saint Mark (Vadit pars quod sub nostra obedient ia accipiantur et mittatur eis Insigne sancti Marci in ...) as well as a Pellanda (Item Illustrissimis Helyas Induatur una veste veluti more suo).

Marin Barleti in his book published in 1508, mentions two Berisha brothers as notable commanders of Skanderbeg. These are the brothers, Demetrius (Dhimitër) and Nicola (Nikollë) Berisha. The family itself is described as vetusta Berrisius familia (ancient family of Berisha). In the siege of Svetigrad, Demetrius Berisha showed great courage when he saved the life of Skanderbeg who was wounded in midst of battle against the armies of Ballaban Pasha. In 1691 the name Berisa is recorded on a map of Francesco Maria Coronelli.

In 1841, Nikola Vasojević estimated the Berisha to number 16,000, out of whom 4,000 men-at-arms, but Elsie notes that this very high number probably includes neighbouring tribes. The Austro-Hungarian census in Albania (1918) recorded 171 households with 1,013 inhabitants of Berisha. It was later said that the population was 2,300.

Some members of the Berisha tribe migrated to Kosovo, mostly to the region of Gjakova, and converted to Islam. According to British intelligence report, the reason for this migration was the small size of the territory this tribe controlled. The feast of the Catholic Berisha who lived in villages around Peć was the Assumption of Mary (to which they refer to as Zoja e Berishes, or Zoja e Alshiqes, because the Alshiqi are the most numerous). The family name Berisha is derived from the name of the tribe and is particularly common among Albanians in Kosovo. In the 1920s, the whole Berisha tribe in Kosovo, under the leadership of Azem Galica, revolted against the authorities of the Kingdom of Yugoslavia.

== Traditions ==
The Berisha are Catholic. Berisha is one of seven tribes of the Pukë highland and one of twelve tribes mentioned as the followers of the Kanun of Lekë Dukagjini.

== Notable people ==
- Ali Berisha, Egyptian journalist
- Azem Galica, nationalist, resistance fighter and rebel who fought for the unification of Kosovo with Albania
- Adem Jashari, one of the founders of the Kosovo Liberation Army (KLA)
- Sali Berisha, former president and prime-minister of Albania
- Atifete Jahjaga, first female president of Kosovo
- Hasan Prishtina, former prime-minister of Albania
- Ndoc Mark Deda (1830–1907), Albanian patriot
- Nikollë Berisha, commander of Skanderbeg
- Gezim Berisha, Albanian-American entrepreneur
- Rubim Rebisha, Visual Artist
- Jimmy Berisha, football manager
- Etrit Berisha, professional footballer
- Besart Berisha, professional footballer
- Valon Berisha, professional footballer
- Veton Berisha, professional footballer
- Bashkim Berisha, former Thai boxing Champion
- Bekim Berisha, Kosovo Albanian wars veteran
- Anton Berisha, Albanian scholar and folklorist
- Kastriot Berishaj, politician
- Hisen Berisha, former KLA commander who fought in the battle of Koshare
- Rrustem Berisha, former KLA commander who fought in the battle of Koshare
- Ram Binaku, freedom fighter
- Agim Ramdani, former KLA commander who fought in the battle of koshare
- Idriz Seferi, an Albanian kaçak
- Zana Berisha (born 1995) is a Kosovar model and beauty pageant titleholder who won Miss Kosovo 2018 on June 29, 2018.
- Medon Berisha (born 21 October 2003) is a footballer who plays as a midfielder for the Albania national team.
- Demo Beriša, Minister of Human and Minority Rights and Social Dialogue of Serbia
- JMSN, born Christian Berishaj, singer-songwriter

== See also ==
- Tribes of Albania

== Sources ==
- Durham, Edith (1909). "High Albania". London: Edward Arnold.
- Elsie, Robert (2010) [2004]. Historical Dictionary Of Albania (PDF) (2nd ed.). Maryland: Rowman & Littlefield Publishing Group. ISBN 978-1-282-52192-6. OCLC 816372706. Archived from the original (PDF) on 2014-10-06.
- Elsie, Robert (2015). The Tribes of Albania: History, Society and Culture. I.B.Tauris. ISBN 978-1-78453-401-1.
- Etnografski institut (1967). Život i običaji narodni. Vol. 80. Etnografski institut.
- Krasniqi, Mark (1984). Lugu i Baranit: monografi etno-gjeografike. Akademia e shkencave dhe e arteve e Kosovës.
- Srpski etnografski zbornik [Serbian ethnographic series]. Vol. 90–91. SANU. 1976.
- Etnografski institut (1958). Zbornik radova Etnografskog instituta [Bulletin of the Ethnographical Institute]. Vol. 7–8. Naučno delo.
