= Shpend =

- Gender: Male

Origin
- Region of origin: Albania, Kosovo

Shpend is an Albanian masculine given name and may refer to:

- Shpend Ahmeti (born 1978), Kosovar politician
- Shpend Dragobia (1853–1918), Albanian soldier and revolutionary
- Shpend Hasani (born 1996), German footballer
