= Shosh, Albania =

Shosh
- Administrative unit
- Location within Albania
- Coordinates: 42°15′N 19°46′E
- Country: Albania
- County: Shkodër
- Municipality: Shkodër
  - Administrative unit: 52.13 km^{2} (20.13 sq mi)

Population (2023)
  - Administrative unit: 90
  - Administrative unit density: 1.7/km^{2} (4.5/sq mi)
- Time zone: UTC+1 (CET)
  - Summer (DST): UTC+2 (CEST)

Shosh is a former municipality in the Shkodër County, northwestern Albania. During the 2015 local government reform it became a municipal unit of the municipality Shkodër. The population as of the 2023 census is 304. Its territory coincides with that of the historical Shoshi tribe. It is part of the Dukagjin Highlands region.

Historical population
Year	Pop.	±%
1989	2,092	—
2001	1,151	−45.0%
2011	304	−73.6%
2023	90	−70.4%
