= Shpend Dragobia =

Albanian military commander

Shpend Dragobia (may also known as Zeqir Elezi of Krasniqi, Shpend Bali Bisheva, or Zeqir Halili) (b.1853, Margegaj, Tropojë - d. August 18, 1918, Dragobi, Tropojë) was an Albanian warrior during the pre-Albanian declaration of independence period and later. He was the son of Bali Arif Bisheva, a member of the League of Prizren and fighter during the Albanian uprising of 1845-1862 against the German-born Marshal Mehmed Ali Pasha. Shpend Dragobia grew up to be a patriotic figure known for his wisdom, character and bravery.

== Biography ==
He spent his childhood in Peja as the guest of Haxhi Zeka, whom he was related to. Among the Albanian patriots, he mustered courage and began fighting. During the years of 1908–1910, Dragobia fought Turkish, Greek, Montenegrin and Serb invading forces and participated in the Albanian declaration of independence in Vlora in 1912. He continued as the leader of the Highlands of Gjakova. During the July revolution, he continued to live in his home village.

He was shot in the back in 1918 at the age of 65 by Austro-Hungarian forces in Qafa e Markofqes, in the mountain of Gjarpri in today's Kukës County. He was a close friend and related to Isa Boletini. He is a venerated figure in Albania and Kosovo. He also helped Bajram Curri open up a school in Krasniqe.

According to Montenegrin archives, on October 15, 1912, Bajram Curri and Shpend Dragobia vowed to attack Montenegrin forces every day if they tried to invade Albanian territories. On August 5, 1912, Dragobia and Curri freed 1000 Albanian prisoners in Skopje (Alb: Shkup) and raised the flag with 6000 fighters. On July 22, he, alongside highlanders from Dukagjin, numbering 12000, liberated Prishtina from the Ottomans. Shpend Dragobia united the tribes of Krasniqi, Gashi, Has, and Rekë in the highlands of Tropoje. In mars 7, 1912, Adil Beg, a minister under the influence of the Young Turks, was on his way to visit Mitrovica, Peja and Gjakova to try and calm the revolters. They were attacked by Dragobia and his men and fighting lasted for three days. Shpend Dragobia is mentioned in Albanian epic folklore and there is a cave named after him in Tropojë.

== Film ==
The Albanian film Nentori i Dyte features the character Shpend Dragobia in a scene where he goes down on knees and kisses the newly sown Albanian flag. The role is played by Mario Ashiku.
