= Toplana (region) =

Region in northern Albania; historic Albanian tribe

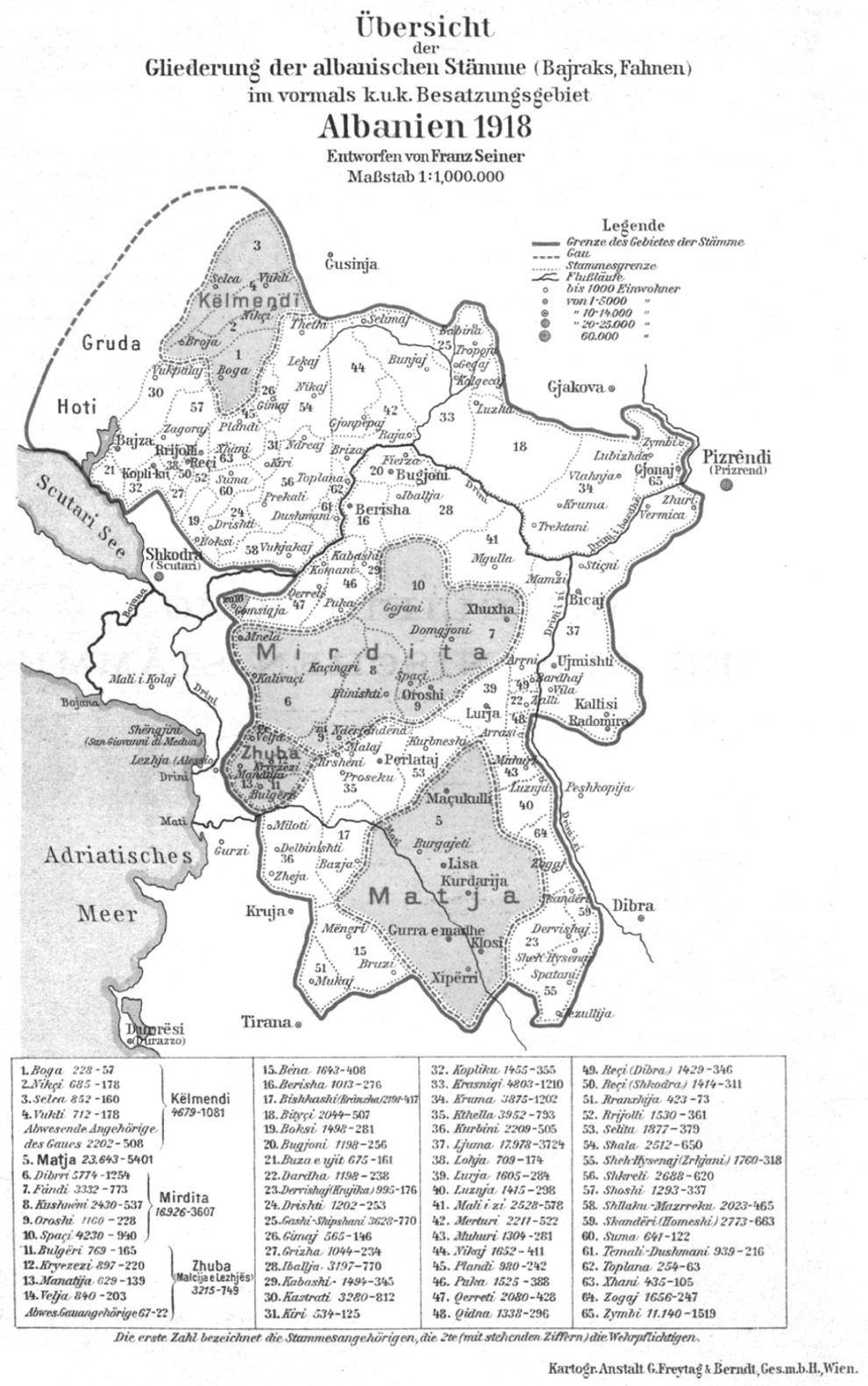
Albanian bayraks as of 1918 from Franz Seiner. Toplana located in section 62, between Dushmani, Shkreli, Mërturi, and Berisha. Name does not appear on the map, but inside the legend.

Toplana is a historical Albanian tribe (fis) and ethnographic region located on the northern banks of the River Drin in northern Albania.

== Etymology ==
The etymology of Toplana is unclear and a matter of contestation. One theory maintains that the toponym is ultimately derived from Proto-Slavic *toplъ ("warm") and may be in reference to warm mineral springs or lakes. However, this seems unlikely given the region's colder climate and lack of such warm bodies of water. The other and more plausible theory argues that the toponym is a compound of Albanian të or tu (both roughly meaning "to" or "at") + planë which is derived from Latin planus ("flat" or "plain") and is found across northern Albania (e.g., the nearby region of Plani). This is further supported by the fact that the form Tplan is attested and used. The micro-toponym Qafë Planës is found in Toplana.

== Geography ==
Toplana is situated on the northern banks of the River Drin in the easternmost section of the former Shkodër District and its main settlements are Serme and Toplane. It borders the historical tribal territories of the Shoshi to the west, Mërturi to the north-east, Berisha to the south-east on the other side of the Drin, and the Dushmani to the south-west.

== Origin ==
In 1907, Franz Nopcsa von Felső-Szilvás recorded an oral tradition of the Toplana which maintained that they were descended from the younger brother of Can Gabeti who was the forefather of the nearby Shllaku. As such they were also related to a part of the Gashi tribe from the Gjakova Highlands (Albanian: Malësia e Gjakovës), who were descended from another unnamed brother of Can Gabeti. However, the alleged connection with Toplana and Shllaku is not supported by genetic results, which indicate that the Toplana and Shllaku are related to one another but do not have blood ties with the Gashi. It is claimed that the brothers arrived from the tribal territory occupied by the Vasojevići in the highlands of north-eastern Montenegro; tradition holds that they were pushed out of the region following the arrival and expansion of the aforementioned tribe. The Toplana could trace their ancestry 13 generations back and thus Nopcsa argued that their forefather left Shllaku in ca. 1524 or earlier. The anas (indigenous) population was driven out and reduced to a single settlement called Gjuraj. Nopcsa also reported that, during the eighteenth century, a branch of the Toplana under a certain Pep Marku migrated from their native homeland to the village of Iballë and expelled the local Gruda fis to Koprat.

On the other hand, Giuseppe Valentini maintained that only a part of the Toplana stemmed from the territory of Vasojevići and that, according to his estimations, their ancestors had arrived by ca. 1450. According to him, the majority of Toplana traces its patrilineal ancestry back to the Bardhaj fis who had also arrived earlier from Montenegro, as well as to other patrilineages or brotherhoods who had arrived from outside of Toplana. Valentini also tells that a branch of the Toplana under Frrok Kola had migrated from Koprati to Iballë in the year 1600. The Toplana and Shllaku do not intermarry due to shared patrilineal kinship.

The related Koprati fis, which is mentioned in the legends of the Toplana, was among the anas of the Shala Valley that were expelled by the expanding Shala tribe. Valentini also considers them to be from the Bardhaj.

== History ==
Toplana appears in the Ottoman defter of 1485 for the Sanjak of Scutari as an abandoned settlement in the nahiyah of Petrishpan-ili. It subsequently appears in various maps and sources from the seventeenth century, such as in a relation of 1671-2 by Catholic bishop Stefano Gaspari (Shtjefën Gaspari) which records Toplana as having 22 houses and 120 inhabitants. It further informs that the tribe had five churches: that of Saint George, the church of the Assumption of the Virgin, the church of Saint Nicholas, the church of Saint Catherine, and the church of Saint Veneranda. Gaspari also mentions how the Eucharist was not in use and how the locals had no vestments. In the report of the French consul Hyacinthe Hecquard (1814–1866), Toplana had 53, and it is estimated that the population may have been around 400 people during the late nineteenth century. In 1918, Austro-Hungarian authorities recorded that Toplana had 52 households and 254 inhabitants.

Both Nopcsa and Edith Durham noted that the Toplana were an extremely wild tribe and that their annual death-rate from gunshot wounds was around double that of the other Albanian tribes. According to Nopcsa's statistics compiled between 1894 and 1904, the Toplana had the highest percentage of violent deaths, at a percentage of 42.3%. George Gawrych notes that this was due to the extreme prevalence of blood feuds (gjakmarrje) among the tribesmen.

== Religion ==
The people of Toplana are Catholics and venerate Saint George as their patron saint. They celebrate his feast day on 22–3 April, and marks the beginning of summer.

== Brotherhoods ==
Among the brotherhoods and families of the Toplana are the: Ndrepepaj, Lekaj, Geraj, Bicaj, Malutaj, Gjoklekaj, Gjomicaj, Mertiaj, Kolicaj, and Prezhmeshaj.
