= Nikaj =

Region of Albania; historic Albanian tribes

The Nikaj are an historical Albanian tribe (fis) and region in the Highlands of Gjakova of north Albania. The Nikaj tribe is a traditional fis in the sense of being a community that claims paternal descent from one common ancestor, consisting of a single bajrak (military-administrative unit) during the time of the Ottoman Empire. The Nikaj are directly related to the Krasniqi tribe. Today, the Nikaj are usually grouped along with the Mërturi tribe as Nikaj-Mërturi.

== Etymology ==
The term Nikaj as a family and tribal name might occur in a 1485 Ottoman land register, though the first clear mention of the tribe is found in 1671 in the ecclesiastical report of Pietro Stefano Gaspari as Nicagni. It is later mentioned as Nicagni and Nichagni in 1703 by the Archbishop Vicko Zmajevic. The name originates from the anthroponym 'Nikë', itself derived from the Christian name Nicholas. This is in line with oral histories which refer to the ancestral forefather as Nikë Mekshi.

== Geography ==
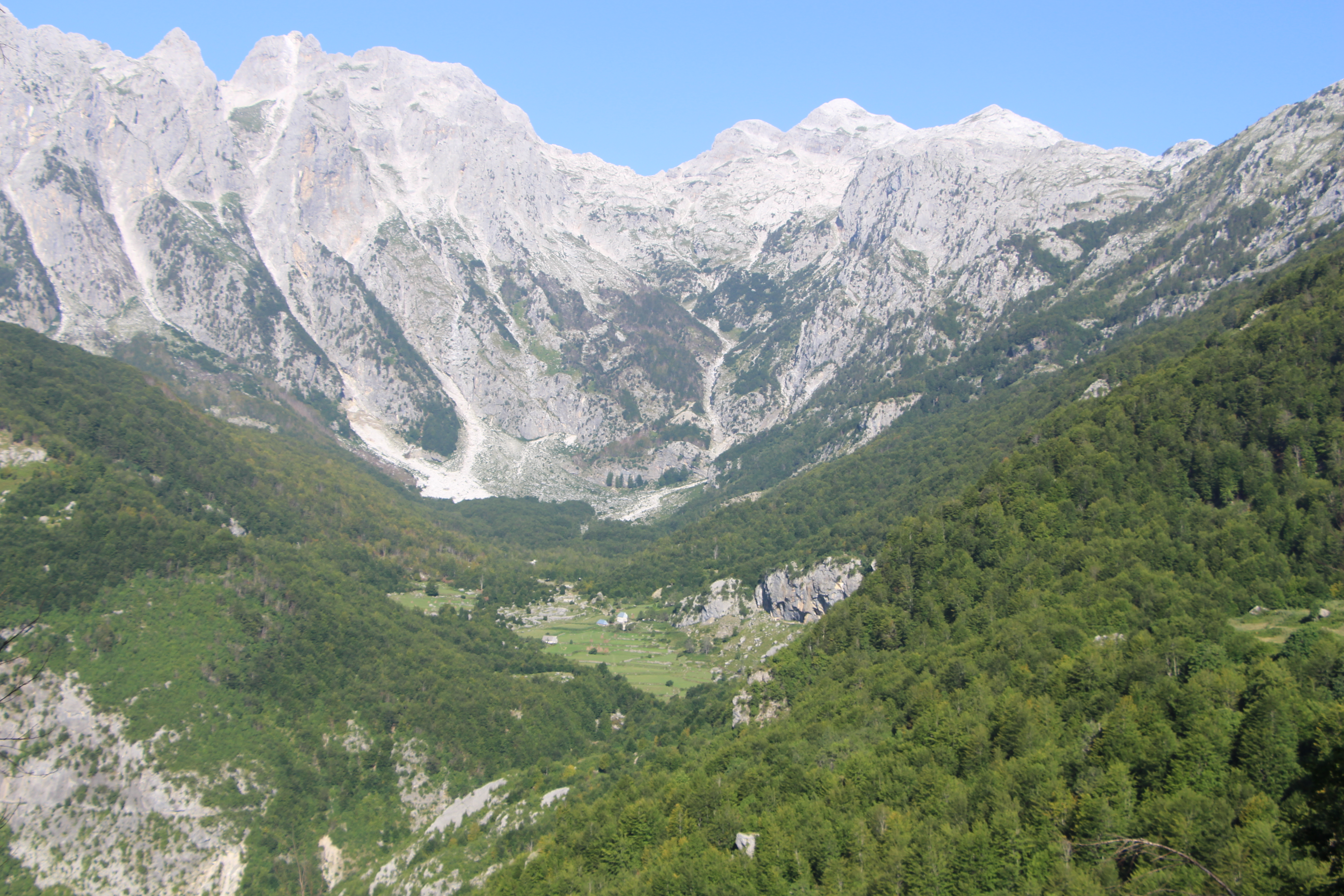
Lekbibaj region, Tropoje

Nikaj tribal territory is positioned north of the Drin river, in the District of Tropoja, Northern Albania, particularly within the ethnographic Highlands of Gjakova. Nikaj tribal territory borders the Krasniqi tribe to the north and the east, the Mërturi to the south and the Shala to the west. Their main settlements include Lekbibaj, Peraj, Curraj i Poshtëm, Curraj i Epërm, Gjonpepaj, Qereç-Mulaj and Shëngjergj.

=== Hydrology ===
Nikaj-Mërtur is a valley trespassed by two rivers: Lumi i Nikajve (English: "Nikaj River") and Lumi i Mërturit (English: "Mërturi River"). The Nikaj River starts in Ndërmanjë valley as Lumi i Zi (English: "Black river"), passes through the Kapiti, Gjonpepaj, and Lekbibaj villages and joins the Mërtur River south-west of Curraj i Poshtëm village. The Mërturi River itself starts in Curraj i Epërm, passes along Mali i Theposur (English: "Sharp mountain") between the villages Shëngjergj and Curraj i Poshtëm, and, after joining the Nikaj River, continues through the villages of Rajë and Tetaj, with the Drin River being its final destination. Both rivers are relatively short.

== Oral traditions ==
The ancestral father of the Nikaj was a herdsman of the Krasniqi tribe by the name of Nikë Mekshi. Nikë left the Krasniqi region prior to the Islamisation of the Krasniqi tribe between roughly 1550-1600, and settled in the area of Paplekaj i Epërm, which houses the ruins of an old church and graveyard. Nikë Mekshi was the brother of Kolë Mekshi, the ancestral father of the Kolmekshaj branch of the Krasniqi tribe, and so the Nikaj do not intermarry with the Krasniqi as they are directly related. Nikë Mekshi's son, Bibë Nikaj, had three sons - Lekë Bibaj, Mark/Mar Bibaj (also called Curr) and Kolë Bibaj. Lekë Bibaj's son, Pap Lekaj, founded the Paplekaj settlement, while Lekë's grandson, Nikë Preni, founded the settlement of Nikprenaj. The inhabitants of Curraj believe themselves to be descended from Mark Bibaj and his two sons, Nikë and Pre.

== Genetics ==
Lauka et al. (2022) tested Nikaj and Krasniqi men to test the correlation of oral traditions with genetic data. The Nikaj and Krasniqi men have the same patrilineal ancestor. As such, they both belong to the same branch haplogroup J2b-M241>L283. J-L283 is a Paleo-Balkan lineage which has been found in samples throughout the region from coastal Dalmatia (Bronze Age) to eastern Dardania (Roman era) as well as in Iron Age Daunians (Italy). It represents 14-18% of Albanian lineages. The oldest J-L283 sample in northern Albania is found in MBA Shkrel as early as the 19th century BCE. In northern Albania, IA Çinamak (Kukës County), half of the men carried J-L283.

The Nikaj and Krasniqi lineages diverge after 1500 CE which is consistent with their origin story from the two brothers Kolë and Nikë Mekshi. The Margegaj belong to the Krasniqi lineage which confirms the oral tradition which considers them descendants of Kolë Mekshi. The Krasniqi and the Nikaj share the same progenitor with a man from Gashi from Luzhë, Tropojë ca. 1200 CE. Their connection indicates that their lineage was present in its present location (Tropojë) in the Middle Ages. The Krasniqi share no close patrilineal relation with all other fis which their traditions connect them with. This highlights that oral traditions don't necessarily reflect "real" kinship relations, but are complex social constructs which are influenced by many different factors.

== History ==
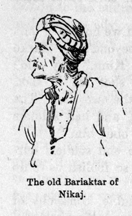
The Old Bajraktar of Nikaj by Edith Durham.

The Nikaj were first recorded as the Nicagni in 1671 as members of the Diocese of Pult, and again in 1703. In 1860-1870, the tribe consisted of 240 households and 2,360 inhabitants. In 1881, the Nikaj tribe consisted of 8 villages with 110 household and 1,800 inhabitants, whereas in 1897-1898 they would once again be recorded with 280 households. In 1903, the Nikaj were attributed 24 villages with 2,445 inhabitants. An Austro-Hungarian census in 1918 recorded the Nikaj as a tribe of 289 households and 1,652 inhabitants.

Upon their arrival to their current region, the Nikaj - and in particular the Curraj - were said to have replaced the Mavriqi, a population that originally hailed from Vajush near Shkodër and settled in what constitutes current Nikaj territory at around 1416-1500. Most of the older populations would eventually emigrate to Guci in Montenegro or were expelled such as the Mavriqi when the Curraj branch extended into Curraj i Epërm, but some families would remain behind and become assimilated. The settlement of Kapit is associated with these older populations, and so some of the families of Kapit are therefore anas. In 1870, the Ottoman government official within the region was killed, and no further Ottoman government officials dared to set foot in the region. Documents in 1890 and 1894 indicate that the Nikaj functioned as an autonomous tribe, and they were a bajrak (military administrative unit) since at least 1881. Traditionally, the Nikaj formed a common bajrak with the Krasniqi tribe for defensive purposes, but after the Battle of Cernica, in which the Nikaj tribesmen managed to capture a banner from their enemy, they earned their right declare themselves as a bajrak on their own. The banner of the Nikaj consisted of a black hand on a white background. During the first half of the 20th century, the Nikaj consisted of a voyvoda, a bajraktar and three tribal elders - the voyvoda was the main leading figure of the tribe and resided in Lekbibaj, whereas the bajraktar was a military chief in times of war and conflict. Sokol Delia, the last bajraktar of the Nikaj who died in 1945, was buried with the banner of the Nikaj.

The Nikaj, along with the Mërturi tribe, were renowned for their banditry, and the Nikaj were known as one of the wildest tribes alongside the Dushmani. In 1904, Austro-Hungarian explorer Karl Steinmetz described the Nikaj-Mërturi as notorious horse and cattle thieves. He also recorded the harsh and warlike lifestyle of the Nikaj tribe, as well as their great cultural hospitality; all men were said to carry rifles and cartridges, even if they lacked shirts and clothing, and the infertile region meant that the Nikaj struggled to get by from simply herding and farming. In 1902, 13 Nikaj men died, 10 of which died from shootings. Edith Durham wrote that the tribe was "wild" and poor, and that the tribesmen did not even obey their own council of elders, but that they were very hospitable. Baron Nopcsa wrote very favourably about the extreme hospitality of the Nikaj families. Nonetheless, travellers would consistently write about how sterile the Nikaj territory was, and how the Nikaj themselves were the most pugnacious and taciturn of all the Albanian mountain tribes.

The Nikaj tribe was known for being so warlike among other Albanian tribes that they were feared by them, and they also had a reputation of not following the tribal law of Lek Dukagjin or their tribal elders.

In 1862, the Ottomans sent Maxharr Pasha with 12 divisions to implement the Tanzimat Reforms in the Highlands of Gjakova. Under the leadership of Mic Sokoli and Binak Alia, the tribes of Krasniqi, Gashi, Bytyçi and Mërturi alongside the Nikaj organized a resistance near Bujan. The rebels were reinforced by the forces of Shala, led by Mark Lula. After heavy fighting, they managed to defeat the Ottoman force and expel them from the highlands.

== Relations with other tribes ==
The Nikaj are directly related to the Krasniqi through shared origin and therefore consider each other to be brothers. They are also extremely close with the Mërturi tribe, so much so that they are commonly grouped together as Nikaj-Mërturi. Folkloric legends also claimed the Nikaj tribe to be related with other Albanian tribes such as the Hoti and the Vasaj, but this has not been genetically proven. The hereditary enemies of the Nikaj were the Shala tribe, with which they had constant armed conflict, skirmishes and blood feuds. They were deeply embittered with each other and would constantly fight with one another; the Krasniqi tribe would aid the Nikaj tribe against the Shala tribe, which was in turn aided by the Shoshi tribe. Subsequently, the Nikaj would aid the Krasniqi tribe against the Gashi tribe.

== Religion ==
The Nikaj are a primarily Catholic tribe, and their patron saint is Saint Sebastian (Shën Mastjan/Shën Mashjan/Shmashjan). His feast day, known as Nata e Shmashjanit (Night of Saint Sebastian) or Shmashjani i Nikajve (Saint Sebastian of the Nikaj), is observed on 19-20 January. The local parish of Nikaj dates from 1827 but the church and parsonage burned down in 1867. The Franciscans then built a new church. Some Catholic Nikaj tribespeople had Muslim names, and it was not uncommon for both Muslims and Catholics to be part of the same family within the Nikaj tribe.

== Notable people ==
- Asllan Curri - Albanian Revolutionary
- Bajram Curri - Albanian Revolutionary
- Hysni Curri - Albanian Revolutionary
- Ndoc Nikaj - One of the founder of Shoqnia Bashkimi

== See also ==
- Nikaj-Mërtur region

== Sources ==
- Lauka, Alban; Muhaj, Ardian; Bojaxhi, Gjergj (2021). "Prejardhja e fiseve Krasniqe Nikaj nën dritën e të dhënave gjenetike, historike dhe traditës burimore [The origin of North Albanian tribes of Krasniqe and Nikaj based on Y-DNA phylogeny, historical data and oral tradition]" (PDF). Studime Historike. 3–4.
- Lazaridis, Iosif; Alpaslan-Roodenberg, Songül; et al. (26 August 2022). "The genetic history of the Southern Arc: A bridge between West Asia and Europe". Science. 377 (6609) eabm4247. doi:10.1126/science.abm4247. PMC 10064553. PMID 36007055.
