= Lekbibaj =

- Administrative unit
- Location within Albania
- Coordinates: 42°18′N 19°56′E
- Country: Albania
- County: Kukës
- Municipality: Tropojë

Population (2023)
  - Administrative unit: 644
- Time zone: UTC+1 (CET)
  - Summer (DST): UTC+2 (CEST)

Lekbibaj is a village and a former municipality Tropojë northern Albania. At the 2015 local government reform it became a subdivision of the municipality Tropojë. The population at the 2023 census was 644. It is the historical center of the Nikaj-Mërtur region.

== Etymology ==
The etymology of the name of this village is in Albanian, as it is a binary word consisting of Lekë+Bibaj (Lekë is an Albanian personal name, while bibë is an Albanian word and personal name related to a type of bird).
