= Nikaj-Mërtur region =

Regional park and a tourist attraction in Albania

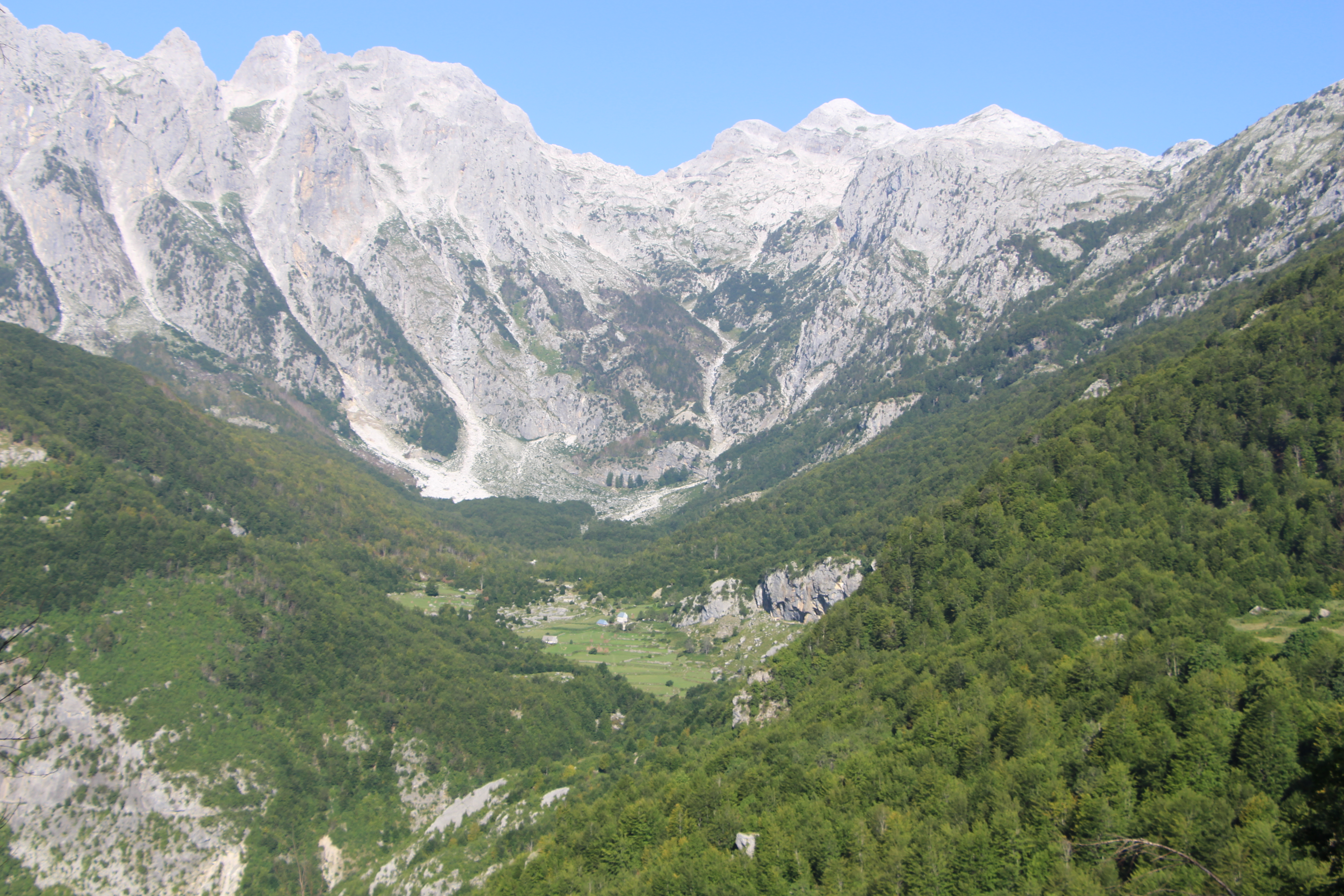
- Lekbibaj Village in Tropojë

- Location within Albania
- Location: Kukës & Shkodër County
- Nearest city: Bajram Curri
- Coordinates: 42°19′16″N 19°52′42″E
- Area: 17,505 hectares (175.05 km^{2})

The Nikaj-Mërtur region (Albanian: Parku Natyror Rajonal Nikaj-Mërtur) is a regional nature park in northern Albania, strategically inside the southeastern Albanian Alps in Tropojë. It lies within the area of the historical Nikaj and Mërturi tribes. The park is an area of alpine landscapes, deep valleys, vertical cliffs, dense coniferous and deciduous forests, small lakes and rivers. The International Union for Conservation of Nature (IUCN) has listed the park as Category IV. Like most of the Albanian Alps, it is listed as an important Plant Area, because it supports significant plant species.

The park lies within the Albanian Alps and borders Alps of Albania National Park. It is proposed to expand the park's boundaries and merge it with Valbonë Valley and Theth to establish the Balkan Peace Park. The Albanian Alps are a continuation of the Dinaric Alps, which extend from northeastern Italy down to northern Albania.

Located between the steep and rugged topography of the Albanian Alps, the region is characterized by significant diversity in flora. The region falls within the Dinaric Mountains mixed forests terrestrial ecoregion of the Palearctic temperate broadleaf and mixed forest biome. The vegetation of the park includes many communities of a Mediterranean and Eurasian type. It is covered by a mixture of oak, beech and pine trees growing on limestone and dolomite, which is characteristically to the Alps. The most widespread floral communities of oak are dominated by Italian oak, Austrian oak, sessile oak and Macedonian oak. The beech and pine trees are represented by species such as European beech, Bosnian pine and Austrian pine.

The park features a great variety of ecosystems and shelters wildlife. It dwells a number of various species that are fast becoming rare in Southern Europe, with animals such as the Eurasian lynx which inhabits the rugged forested areas, the endangered brown bear and gray wolf. Moreover, the woods provide also shelter for species including chamois, western capercaillie and griffon vulture. The park is an important sanctuary of the peregrine falcon and common kestrel.

== See also ==
- Geography of Albania
- Protected areas of Albania
- Albanian Alps
