= Dukagjin Highlands =

Region of Albania; part of the Shkodër District

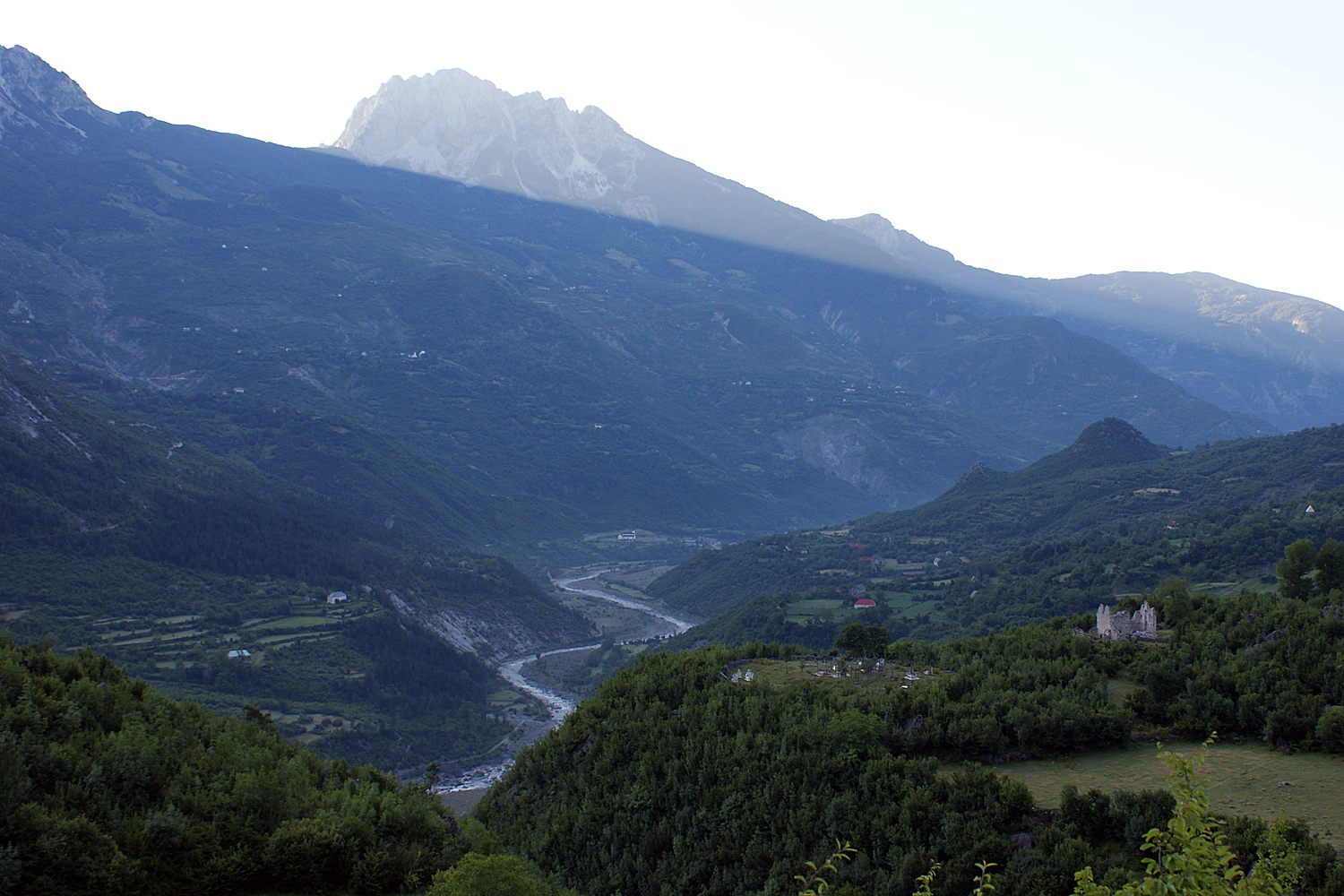
Shala valley

Dukagjin Highlands (Albanian: Malësia e Dukagjinit) is a mountainous region in northern Albania, east of Shkodra and north of the Drin. It is roughly equivalent to the northern half of the Shkodër District, with some minor parts in the Malësi e Madhe District.

== Geography ==
It is a mountainous region in northern Albania, east of Shkodra and north of the Drin, including parts of western and central Accursed Mountains range within the Albanian border (Northern Mountain Range), roughly centered in the northern half of the Shkodër District (some minor parts are located in Malësi e Madhe District). The highest point is Maja Jezerce (2694 m). The Shala and Kir rivers are located within the region.

To the west lies the Malësia tribal region which includes the tribes of Hoti, Kastrati, Kelmendi, and Shkreli. To the east lies Malësia e Gjakovës which includes the tribes of Krasniqi, Gashi, and Bytyqi.

=== Settlements ===
==== Pult municipality ====
- Mëgullë
- Pog
- Plan
- Xhan
- Gjuraj
- Kiri
- Bruçaj

==== Shalë municipality ====
- Theth
- Nënmavriq
- Abat
- Mekshaj
- Nicaj-Shalë
- Gimaj
- Vuksanaj
- Lotaj
- Ndërlysaj
- Lekaj (Qete)
- Pecaj
- Rracaj
- Breg-Lumi

==== Shosh municipality ====
- Pepsumaj
- Brashtë
- Ndrejaj
- Nicaj-Shosh
- Palaj

==== Temal municipality ====
- Koman
- Malagji-Kajvall
- Kllogjen
- Toplanë
- Vile
- Serme
- Arrë
- Telumë

== History ==
=== Middle Ages ===
==== High Middle Ages ====
Balec and its surroundings were part of the Byzantine Theme of Dyrrhachium until the Serbian ruler Stefan Vojislav (1018–1043) conquered the region and gave Baleč the status of seat of the župa (county) of Barezi as part of Duklja. By the time of the reign of Constantine Bodin (1081–1101), all of northern Albania (north of Drin), and also some fortresses to the south of the Drin, were part of Vojislavljević's realm.

Pilot (Pult), including Dagno, was a county of Serbian Grand Prince Stefan Nemanja (1166-1196). The important Via de Zenta, a trade route connecting the Adriatic with Nemanjić' Serbia (see Serbian Grand Principality, Kingdom, Empire), crossed this region; It started from the mouth of the Buna, the Shkodër (Skadar) port, (alternatively Bar then Cetinje) along the Drin Valley to Prizren, then to Lipjan, then through Novo Brdo to Vranje and Niš. The Republic of Venice and Ragusa used the road for trade with Serbia and Bulgaria. The road ended its use with the conquering of this part of Serbia by the Ottoman Empire. Situated further to the south was Arbanon.

==== Late Middle Ages ====
With the crowning of Stephen Uroš III Dečanski of Serbia, Stephen Uroš IV Dušan was crowned Young King of Zeta. Žarko held Lower Zeta during the reign of Emperor Dušan the Mighty. In 1360, Balsha I and his sons are mentioned as "lords of Skadar", thus, Žarko may have either lost the rule or died. On 18 September 1385, Balsha II was killed by the Ottomans at the Battle of Savra, and he was succeeded by his nephew Gjergj II Balsha who inherited the parts of Zeta and northern Albania, including the cities of Shkodër, Drisht and Lezhë, as per the Balshas' traditional rule of seniority. On 2 June 1403, the Venetian Senate confirmed Goranin, Damjan and Nenad of the Dushmani family the rule of Pilot.

In Venetian documents, Lekë Dushmani and his relative Damian are mentioned as lords of Pult in 1446. On March 2, 1444, Dushmani became a founding member of the League of Lezhë. According to Fan Noli, Peter Spani who also joined the League, ruled Shala and Shoshi. Pal Dukagjini and Nikola Dukagjini, who also joined the league as vassals to Lekë Zaharia, did not rule this area, but a region farther to the east, which included villages Buba, Salita, Gurichuchi, Baschina.

=== Modern ===
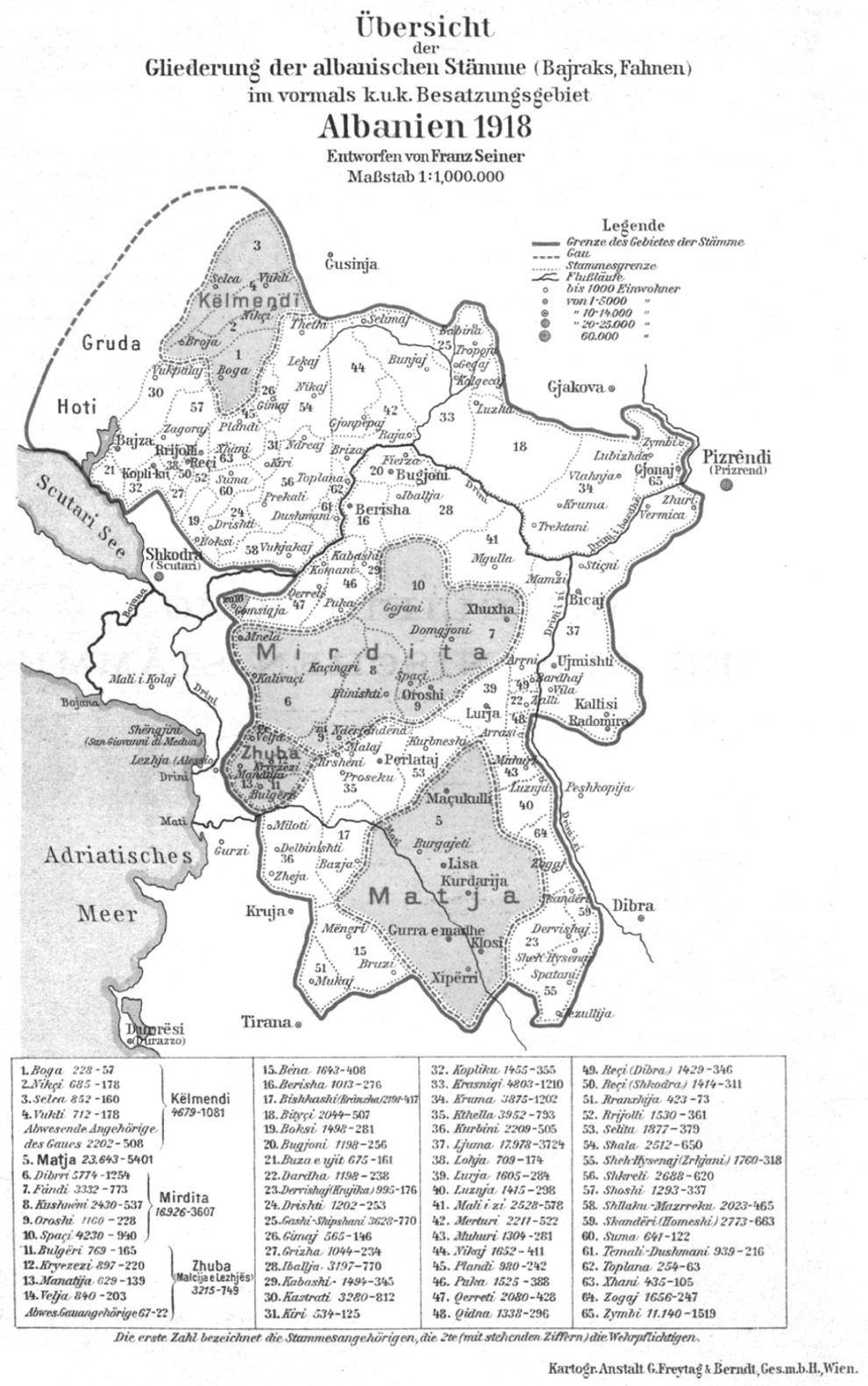
Albanian bajraks (1918).

Visiting Theth in the early 20th century, the traveller Edith Durham said:

I think no place where human beings live has given me such an impression of majestic isolation from all the world.

Edith Durham described Theth as a "bariak" of some 180 houses and also observed that it was almost free from the tradition of blood feud (known in the Albanian language as Gjakmarrja) which so blighted other parts of the Albanian highlands.

In the First Balkan War, the Dukagjin region was occupied by the Principality of Montenegro. After the Treaty of London in May, 1913, the Great Powers recognized the independence of the Principality of Albania and appointed German Wilhelm Friedrich Heinrich as monarch. The Dukagjin region was subsequently included into Albania.

== Anthropology ==
According to Bell (1931), "Upper Pulti, the region to the north-north-east of Shkodra, is inhabited by the Merturi, Nikaj, Shala, Shoshi, Toplana, and Gimaj clans, bajraks, or groups of bajraks." According to Myres (1945), "In Malsia e vogel are included Shala, Shoshi, Plandi, and the tribes of the Toplane district".

According to Enke (1955), the "Mountains of Dukagjin" (German: Bergen des Dukagjin) was inhabited by the "seven bajraks, Shala, Shoshi, Kir, Xhan, Plan, Shllak and Toplana.". According to Prothero (1973), "The Dukagjin (in the Wider sense) include the six bajraks of the Pulati, Shala and Shoshi, Dushmani, Toplana, Nikaj, and Merturi. Their territory lies between the Malsia e Madhe and the River Drin."

According to an Austrian map dating to 1918, the tribes had the following main settlements (including modern municipalities): Shala had Theth, Nderlysaj, Pecaj, Nicaj-Shalë, Abat, Nenmavriq, Pjollë, Breglum, Vuksanaj, Lotaj, Lekaj and Gimaj (in Shalë); Shoshi had Ndrejaj, Pylaj, Celaj, Pepaj, Pilotaj, Pepsumaj, Palaj and Nicaj-Shosh (in Shosh); Kiri had Kiri (in Pult); Xhani had Xhan (in Pult); Plani had Plan, Gjuraj and Than (in Pult); Shllaku had Barcolle, Benë, Gushtë, Palaj-Gushaj, Vukjakaj-Gegaj and Kroni i Madh (in Shllak)Toplan had Toplanë (in Toplane).

All six tribes today belong to the Roman Catholic faith. They speak the Northwestern Gheg dialect of Albanian. The Shala and Shoshi tribes are closely associated, have the same occupations and characteristics, and are sometimes called one bajrak. Lekë Dukagjini's Kanun, a set of customary laws, are still today applied in the following regions of Albania: Lezha mountains, Mirditë, Shala-Shoshë and Nikaj-Mertur.

The Gjâma e burrave, or "Men's Lament" is a death rite performed only by men and for men only, maintained exclusively by the Catholic Albanians in the highlands of Dukagjin, in Iballë and Gjakova (in Kosovo). A pagan tradition in Dukagjin and Malesia e Vogel was Shen Verbti ("the holy blind one"), the god of hailstorms who lived in the clouds. In Shala, he was known as Rmoria (possibly from Latin rumor, "shouting, noise, rumour.").

=== Edith Durham's High Albania and its customs (1908) ===
Traveller Edith Durham visited North Albania in the 1900s. She collected the following information about the tribes of Dukagjin, whom she grouped into the Pulati, and then into the two groups of Lower Pulati (or Pulati proper) and those of the Diocese of Pulati. She said that Pulati was hard to define, as the ecclesiastical borders (Diocese of Pulati) extended farther than the Pulati tribes.

Lower Pulati:

- Ghoanni: Small Catholic tribe, one bajrak
- Plani: A Catholic tribe with one bariak, tracing origin of three stocks which are intermarriageable. One descends from Kelmendi.
- Mgula: Small Catholic tribe, one bajrak
- Kiri: Catholic tribe, one bajrak

Diocese of Pulati:

- Shala: A very large entirely Catholic tribe, it has four bajraks (Thethi, Petsaj, Lothaj and Lekaj). According to legend, all bajraks descend from a common ancestor, one of three brothers who fled Raška after the Ottoman conquest. The two other brothers established Shoshi and Mirdita, respectively. The three tribes reckon they are too nearly related to be intermarriageable. Thethi bariak occupy the head of the valley with 180 houses, all Catholic. Thethi is self-governing and is almost independent from the rest of the Shala. The Petsaj, Lothaj, and Lekaj bariaks are said to have separated into three main houses 376 years earlier. Lothaj and Lekaj recently decided they are far enough removed to intermarry. Thethi and Petsaj do not intermarry within the tribe. Shala says that when it arrived in the land, there were already small dark people inhabiting it. They intermarried with these people. Eight houses near Abate, lower Shala, trace their origins to these earlier folk, the rest emigrated to Deçani.
- Shoshi: Same origin as above and it lies south of Shala on the right bank of the Shala river
- Toplana: A small Catholic tribe, one bariak, lying east of Shala on the right bank of the Shala river and it is in a very wild district. It has the highest death-rate from gunshot wounds of all the Christian tribes. It says that it is very old.

The whole district inhabited by the above tribes is called Malsia e vogel ("Little Mountains"). Also included in the diocese of Pulati is:

- Nikaj: An offshoot from the Muslim tribe of Krasniqi, its ancestor Nikola left Krasniqi while Krasniqi was yet Christian. There are one hundred houses in Nikaj; Nikaj is entirely Catholic. It is one of the wildest and most poverty-stricken of the tribes.

== Gallery ==
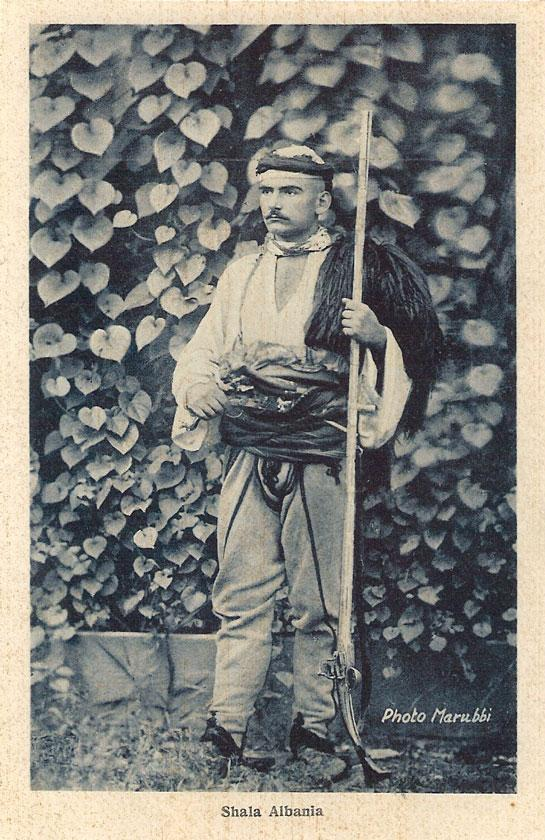
Man from Shala armed with Tançica

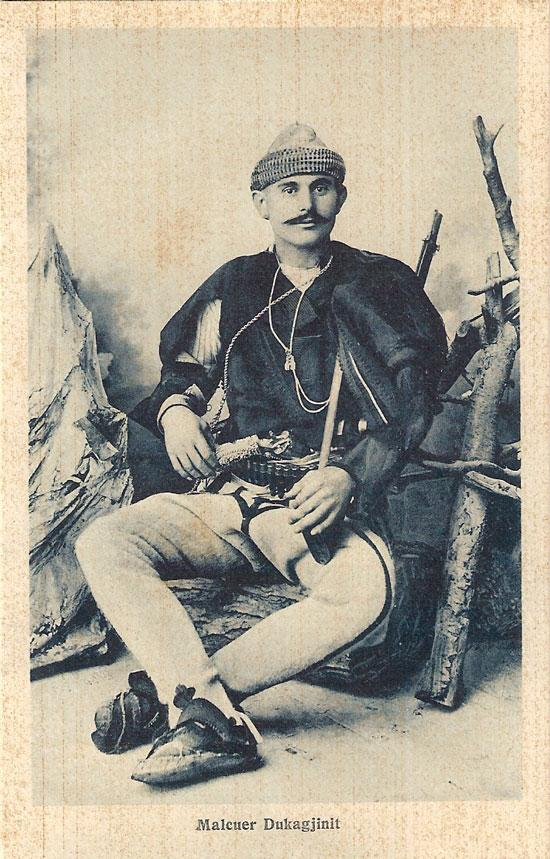
Mountaineer from Dukagjini

== See also ==
- Rrafshi i Dukagjinit in Kosovo
- List of Albanian tribes

== Annotations ==
1. Name: Dukagjin highlands, used by Elsie, is used as the article name. There are also ambiguous terms Dukagjin, or Dukagjini region. The toponym "Dukagjin" is said to derive from duka (duke) and Gjin (John) - "Duke John", but it may possibly be a folk etymology. Malësia e Vogël is a local name referring to the region. It has also been called Tribe of the six bajraks (Fis i gjasht bajrakvet). Another name is Shala-Shoshi, derived from the two centres, Shala and Shoshi.
