= Shoshi (tribe) =

Region in northern Albania; historic Albanian tribe

Coordinates: 42°12′N 19°47′E

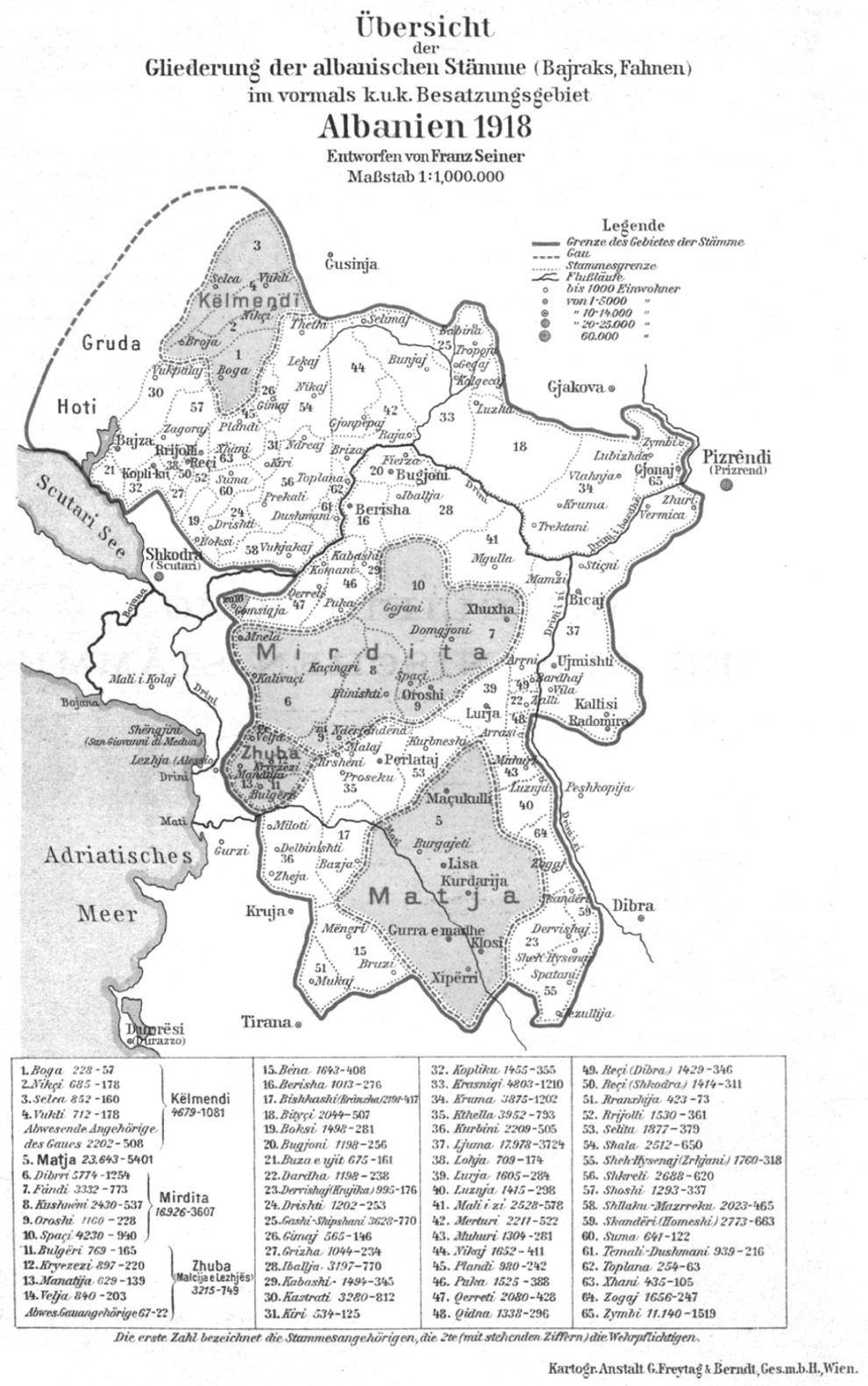
Bayraks of Albania in 1918. The author marked it mistakenly as 57, where Shkreli is located. Its correct location is at No. 57

Shoshi is a historical Albanian tribe (fis) and region of northern Albania in the lower Shala valley. Shoshi is first recorded as a small settlement in 1485. The fis itself traces its origin to the brothers Gjol and Pep Suma. The community of their descendants gradually grew to control part of the Dukagjin highlands. In the 19th century Shoshi also became a bajrak.

== Etymology ==
The term Shoshi has been variously recorded as Sosi (1671), Sciossi (1672), Sciosci (1703) and Scosei (1821). Folk etymologies usually link the name with the noun shoshë 'sieve', however it's more likely derived from Shën Qurku 'Saint Cyriacus', the traditional patron saint of the tribe.

== Geography ==
The Shoshi region stands in north-western Albania, in Shkodër County. It stands about 52 km away from the city of Shkodra. In terms of regional boundaries, Shoshi stands south of Shala, north of Shllaku, west of Toplana and Dushmani and east of Kiri. The historical settlements of Shoshi are: Ndreaj, Brashtë, Pepsumaj, Pepaj, Shosh-Nicaj, Gjolaj, Ndregjinaj, Cilkok, Gjoshaj, Palaj, Pepsumaj, Gjocaj, Pylaj, Gurri i Lekës, Pilotaj, Shosh-Gurrë, Dardhë, Balzë, Mollë. Gjocaj (Autumn of 2000), Mollë (December 2001), Pepsumaj (December 2004), Brashtë (December 2005), Pylotaj (October 2006), Gjoshaj (November 2008), Ndregjinaj (December 2008) are uninhabited (in brackets the date of final emigration from these settlements). These form the Shosh administrative unit of the municipality of Shkodër. Until 2015, Shosh was a municipality (bashki) in itself.

The village of Prekal (linked with the medieval Prekali tribe), about 9 km to the south-west of it is sometimes grouped under Shoshi because most of its families come from Shoshi.

== History ==
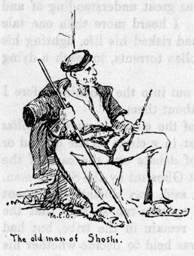
Old man of Shoshi by Edith Durham (1908)

An oral tradition in the area maintains that the ancestor of Shoshi was a Mark Diti, son of Dit Murri and grandson of a Murr Dedi. Mark Diti's brother, Zog Diti, was the progenitor of the Shala tribe, and his other brother, Mir Diti, was considered to be the ancestor of the Mirdita tribe. In the best known tradition, these three brothers came to the area from Pashtrik of Gjakova mountain in western Kosovo, on the modern Albania-Kosovo border. Their settlement then began from south to north, from Mirdita northwards to the lower and upper Shala valley.

The historical figures who are recorded as the forefathers of all Shoshi today are the brothers Gjol and Pep Suma. They are linked to oral tradition as descendants of Mark Diti. They had the surname Suma as they grew up in the Suma from where their mother originated. An alternative theory maintains that they were actually patrilineally descended from Suma.

Shoshi appears in historical record in the defter of the Sanjak of Scutari in 1485 as a small village in the nahiye of Petrishpan-ili with four households headed by Gjon, son of Duka. In the village, one of the households was that of the Catholic cleric Dom Nikolla Bizi. Catholic bishop Shtjefën Gaspari passed through the region in 1671. In his account, Sosi had 30 households and 250 inhabitants. In 1786, Shoshi had not yet been fully established as tribal territory as the village of Shosh, Brashta and also Prekali, appear as distinct settlements that are grouped together, but not part of the same territory. The three villages at that time had 189 households with 1013 inhabitants.

Shoshi remained one of the exclusively Catholic tribes throughout the Ottoman period After the Young Turk Revolution (1908) and subsequent restoration of the Ottoman constitution, the Shoshi tribe made a besa (pledge) to support the document and to stop blood feuding with other tribes until November 6. During the Albanian revolt of 1911 in negotiations with the Ottomans an amnesty was reached for the rebels with a pledge by the government that education in Albanian would be allowed and one to two primary schools in the nahiye of Shoshi and pay the wages of teachers allocated to them.

== Traditions ==
Shoshi had a distinction in the region of possessing a legendary boulder associated with Lekë Dukagjini, Gur' i Lek's, who supposedly stayed in that location. According to local tradition, it was to Shoshi that Lekë Dukagjini, came fleeing from Rashia.

The patron Saint of the Shoshi is Saint Cyriacus (Shën Qurk), whose feast day is commemorated on 12 or 15 July.

The religion of the tribe is entirely Catholic, in the first reliable census taken in Albania in 1918, the population of the Shoshi were 1,293 inhabitants.

== See also ==
- Shosh
- Shala tribe

== Bibliography ==
- Prelë Milani (2011), Shoshi: gjeografia, gjenealogjia, historia, Dukagjini
