= Iballë =

- Administrative unit
- Location within Albania
- Coordinates: 42°11′N 20°0′E
- Country: Albania
- County: Shkodër
- Municipality: Fushë-Arrëz

Population (2011)
  - Administrative unit: 1,129
- Time zone: UTC+1 (CET)
  - Summer (DST): UTC+2 (CEST)

Iballë (pronounced [iˈbaɫə]; Albanian definite form: Iballa) is an old village and a former municipality in Shkodër County, northern Albania. In 2015 it became a subdivision of the municipality Fushë-Arrëz. The population according to the 2011 census was 1,129. The municipal unit contains several villages: Iballë, Sapaç, Levosh, Berishë e Vogël, Berishë Vendi, Berishë e Eperme, Shopel and Mërtur. It is part of the wider Pukë region.

== Transportation ==
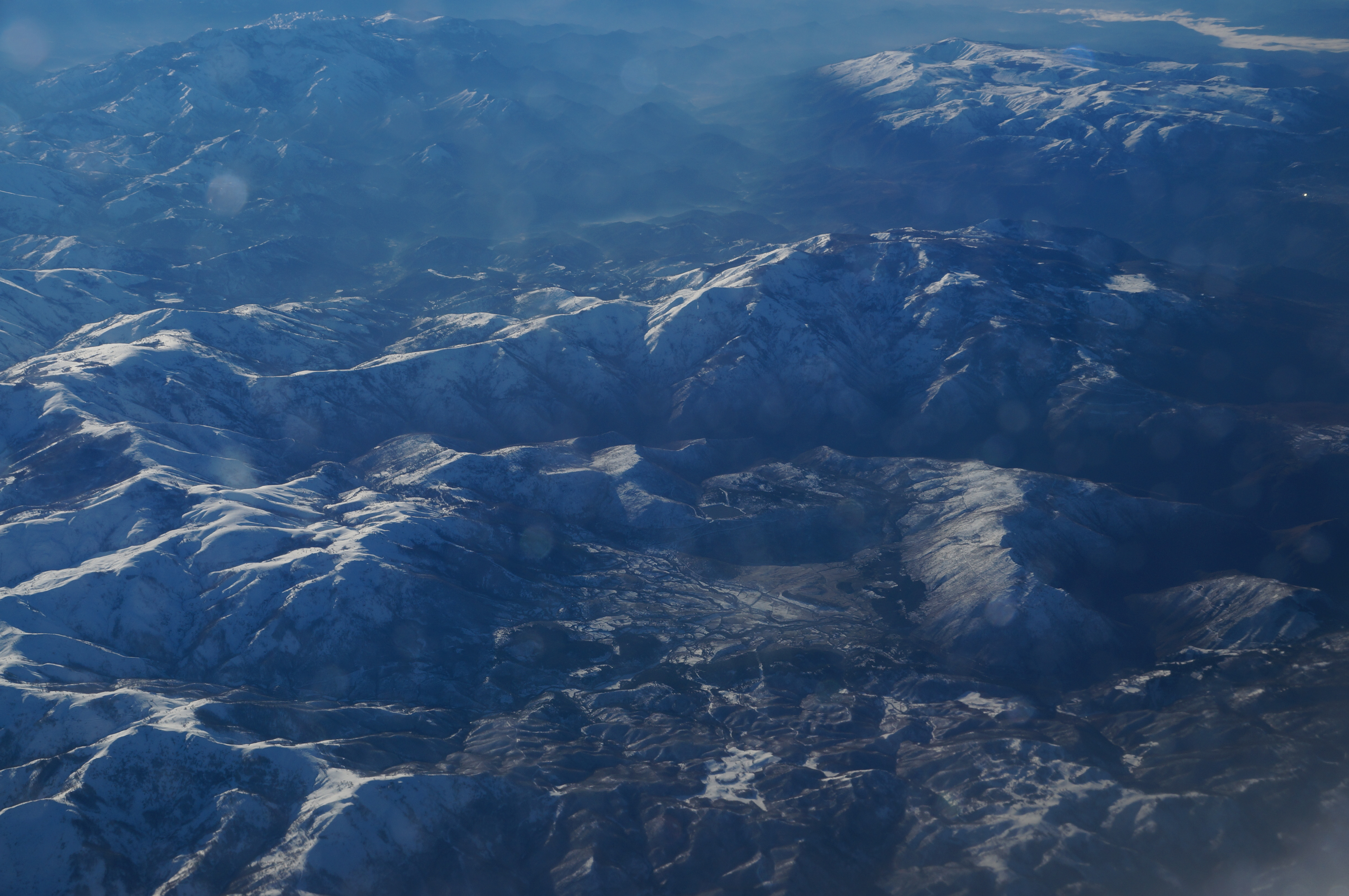
Iballë and the surrounding mountains in Winter seen from North

Different destinations and road conditions.
15 km from Fierzë (Gravel road without maintenance, only for "Off-Roads" cars)
36 km from Fushë-Arrëz (Paved road, 5m asphalt width)
10 km from river Drin (It's the same road for going to Fierzë)
