= Fani (tribe) =

Albanian tribe

The Fani (also Fandi, Fanti) tribe is an Albanian tribe and one of the five bajraks of the ethnographic Mirdita region in northern central Albania.

== Geography ==
Fani tribal territory is situated in the Mirdita municipality, particularly along the upper reaches of the Lesser Fan river. Fani borders the Spaçi tribe to the west, the Mali i Zi tribe to the north, Luma and Arrëni to the east, and Lura and Oroshi to the south.

== Origins ==
The Fani tribe take their name from the Fan river. Unlike the Spaçi, Oroshi and Kushneni tribes, the Fani are not one of the three original bajraks of Mirdita, and were initially one of the bajraks of Lurë and Luma to the east. As a Catholic tribe, the Fani joined the bajraks of Mirdita when most of the Luma region converted to Islam at some point around the 18th century. The Fani are composed of various lineages, and during the 1950s, as many as 170 households around Bisakë were of Thaçi lineage.

== History ==
Due to the Fani tribe taking their name from the Fan river, most historical references to the term refer to the river rather than the tribe. The first mention of Fani was by Gjon Muzaka in the Muzaka chronicles in 1510, in which the region was mentioned as belonging to the Dukagjini family. Numerous references to the river, the tribe and the region were also made during the 17th century.

The Fani were known as an unruly tribe during the time of Ottoman control in Albania. When the Catholic Archbishop of Tivar, Marino Bizzi, passed through the Fani region in the summer of 1610, he documented numerous observations on the tribe. During this time, the Fani still warred against the Turks and were known to not only raid other regions of Albania, but also parts of Serbia as well, indiscriminately targeting both Muslims and Christians on their raids. Bizzi also wrote that the Fani were "a proud people accustomed to suffering", mentioning that most of the tribesmen walked around barefoot yet heavily armed with shields, javelins, arrows and scimitars. Both men and women were barely clothed, and when Archbishop Bizzi attempted to speak to the elders of the tribe about correcting the women's clothing so as to prevent the promotion of "licentious behaviour", they responded that no one in the country would be scandalised as it had been "the custom of the land since ancient times". Due to their continuous raiding and pillaging of neighbouring regions, the Fani were expelled from their homeland by Sanjakbey Vërlaci in 1666, but returned only two years later. They were visited shortly after by apostolic visitor Pietro Stefano Gaspari in 1671–1672, who reported that even the priest of Fani bared a knife and a firearm wherever he went.

In 1881, the Fani tribe in Mirdita numbered to 510 households with 4200-4600 inhabitants on a territory of 150 km^{2}. In 1895, it was recorded as a parish with 450 households in the villages of Konaj, Domgjon, Xhuxhë, Shëngjin and Bisakë, and the bajraktar (chieftain) of the tribe resided in Domgjoni. In 1956, the bajraktar was Hajdar Bajraktari. In the Austro-Hungarian census of Albania in 1918, the Fani tribe were recorded as having 504 households and a total of 3,332 inhabitants in the settlements and surroundings of Konaj, Bisakë, Shëngjin, Domgjon, Xhuxhë and Sërriqja.

=== Tensions with the Ottomans ===
During the Great Turkish War of the late 17th century, Albanians in the Sanjaks of Dukagjin (northern Albania and western Kosovo), Ohrid and the district of Montenegro allied with the Habsburgs and rebelled against the Ottomans. After the withdrawal of Habsburg forces from the region, the Ottomans made a list of tribes and regions which allied with the Habsburgs during the war in order to pacify them and ensure that they wouldn't attempt to rebel again; the Fani were amongst the tribes that dominated the list.

Gaspër Krasniqi, the abbot of Mirdita's most notable church (the Abbey of Saint Alexander in Orosh), was at odds with the kapedan of Mirdita, Bib Dod Pasha, who did not approve of his anti-Ottoman efforts. This prompted Krasniqi to seek refuge with the Fani towards 1857. Coinciding with Krasniqi's arrival, anti-Ottoman unrest began to spread throughout northern Albania due to the imposition of a new tax for all Christian Ottoman subjects that were exempt from conscription. The Fani, who had always been exempt from such a tax, were amongst those who rebelled against the Ottomans, and they saw in Krasniqi a strategic partnership which he also required in turn to protect himself from his political opponents.

Krasniqi would seek refuge amongst the Fani for a second time in 1864 when his position became unstable yet again, prompting Bib Dod Pasha to attempt to capture him and his supporters. Krasniqi escaped, but several priests who supported him were arrested, prompting the bishop of Lezhë to intercede and mediate on behalf of the arrested priests. In the meanwhile, the bishop refused to replace the arrested priests from the parishes of Fani, causing the Fani to petition Bib Dod Pasha to intervene on their behalf. Bib Doda was unable to resolve the situation, which delegitimised him in the eyes of the Fani and the other tribes of Mirdita.

=== Fani Settlement in Kosovo ===
Many of the Fani tribesmen migrated to western Kosovo as the Fani tribal territory was extremely poor and did not have enough arable land to sustain them all. In 1840, 300 families migrated to the mountains of the Has region near Gjakova, and there were 4,000 of them working the land and caring for their livestock in the Gjakova region by the 1850s. By 1890, 400 families had settled in the plains of Gjakova as tenant farmers of local landowners, with only a few having managed to buy land there or in other parts of Kosova. The Mirditors of this region were colloquially called "Fand". Many of them had left Fani for Gjakova due to blood feuds, and they were known for their courage and sense of pride. The French consul in Shkodra, Emile Wiet, noted that the Catholic element of Gjakova was composed of tribesmen originating from Fani, stating that they had lived in this region for generations and governed themselves. The Catholics of Gjakova were particularly loyal to the Ottoman sultan, constituting the only armed force in the region available to the Ottomans in the case of an attack from the Albanian Muslim tribes of the Gjakova Highlands, and they were used by the Ottomans as an auxiliary police force.

== Religion ==
The Fani are an entirely Catholic tribe, and their patron saint is Saint Mark. By joining the exclusively Catholic bajraks of Mirdita, the Fani tribe detached itself from the dependence of the Ottoman governors of Prizren, who held influence over the tribes of Luma. The Fani traditionally celebrated the feast for Saint Mark the Evangelist, but also the Sunday closest to the feast of Saint Nicholas in December. The meetings of the tribe are traditionally held at the church of Saint Mark.

== Relation with other tribes ==
Since the Fani are not one of the three original bajraks of Mirdita (Spaçi, Kushneni and Oroshi), they are not consanguineous with these tribes and can therefore intermarry with them.
