= Xhani =

Region in Albania; historic Albanian tribe

Xhani is a historical Albanian tribe (fis) and ethnographic region located on the western side of the upper Kir river in the wider region of Pulti, northern Albania.

== Name ==
Xhani derives its name from the anthroponym Iohannes and is attested in various forms such as: Xhaj, Xhovani, Gjani, Joani, Ghoanni, Giovagni, Gioagni, Huan, and Zuanni. Italian missionaries serving in the region also Italianized the tribal name as Giovanni.

== Geography ==
Xhani is situated on the eastern banks of the upper Kir river in the mountains of Pulti. It borders the tribal territories of Plani to the north, Kiri to the east, Suma to the south, and Rrjolli to the west. The main settlement is that of Xhan.

== Origin ==
It is believed that the Xhani were among the anas (indigenous) fise of the Shkreli tribal territory, and that they were driven out of their native lands following the expansion of the Shkreli across the valley of the Përroi i Thatë. The modern settlement of Xhaj in Shkrel, between Ducaj and Makaj, is connected to the Xhani. Giuseppe Valentini further elaborates that 30 families of the Xhani are descended from a widow who was married in Shkreli but had returned to her birthplace with her children following her husband's death.

== History ==
Xhani (Huan or Xhovan) is recorded in the Ottoman defter of 1485 for the Sanjak of Scutari as a settlement in the ziamet of Mehmet Bey in the nahiyah of Petrishpan-ili. The village had a total of seven households which were represented by the following household heads: Gjergji, son of Prekali; Marini, son of Prekali; Gjergji, son of Mlusha; Isfani, son of Nui; Dimeniku, son of Kalshi; Kola, son of Prekali; and Martini, son of Sunja.

The Xhani are subsequently recorded in later documents, such as in the relation of 1671 by Catholic bishop Stefano Gaspari (Shtjefën Gaspari) which reports that Xhani had 22 houses and 80 inhabitants, as well as a well-built church dedicated to Saint Nicholas. In the report of the French consul Hyacinthe Hecquard (1814–1866), Xhani had 115 houses and 662 inhabitants. However, later in 1918, according to statistics compiled by the Austro-Hungarian authorities, Xhani had a reduction in population as only 62 houses and 435 inhabitants are recorded.

== Religion ==
Around two-thirds (~66%) of Xhani is Catholic while the remainder is Muslim. The Catholics of the tribe venerate Saint Nicholas as their patron saint.
