= Kryezezi =

Region in Albania; historic Albanian tribe

The Kryezezi are a historical Albanian tribe (fis) and tribal region in the districts of Lezha and Mirdita of northern Albania. It is one of the four traditional bajraks of the Highlands of Lezha (Malësia e Lezhës), alongside the Bulgëri, Vela and Manatia.

== Geography ==
Kryezezi tribal territory is located on the northern side of the Fan river, particularly where the Greater and Lesser Fan rivers unite down to about Rubik. It is bordered by the Manatia tribal region to the west, the Vela tribal region to the north, the Dibrri tribal region of Mirdita to the east and the Bulgëri tribal territory to the south. Their main settlements include Rubik, Munaz, Vau i Shkjezës, and the now abandoned Kryezez.

== Etymology ==
The term Kryezezi translates to 'black head'.

== History ==
The Kryezezi are the first, primary Bajrak of the Lezha Highlands, and were also known as Kryezezi Krypaxhi (meaning Kryezezi Salters) probably because of their proximity to the sea and therefore their role as salt suppliers to the other Bajraks of Mirdita and the Lezha Highlands. They joined the Mirdita tribe in 1818 along with the rest of the tribes of the Highlands of Lezha. The tribal toponym first appears shortly after 1640 as Crosesi and appears in 1866 as Criesesi, where it was estimated to have 60 households at this time. In 1905, Karl Steinmetz estimated the Kryezezi to have 120 households, and described them as a destitute yet peace-loving tribe. They did not plunder the lowlands like their neighbours, and no murders had been committed on Kryezezi territory for years. Edith Durham, who visited Kryezezi territory in the summer of 1908, was refused hospitality by a foreign, non-Albanian Franciscan friar at the church of Rubik, much to the dismay of the local Albanians of the Kryezezi tribe who were outraged by the act. In 1918, the Kryezezi had 138 households with 879 inhabitants.

== Religion ==
The Kryezezi are a Catholic tribe, just like all tribes in Mirdita and the Lezha Highlands. There was a monastery in Rubik that sat upon a cliff overlooking the Fan river that had been founded by the Benedictines. The Church of the Holy Savour, which was the only remaining part of the monastery, was taken over by Franciscans and restored in 1782 and 1837.
