= Dibër Valley =

The Dibër Valley (Albanian definite form: Dibra; Macedonian: Дебар, Debar; Turkish: Debre) is a section of the Black Drin river valley in the border region between North Macedonia and Albania, forming a historical region.

Today, the Dibër Valley is split into two territorial divisions - Big Dibër (Albanian: Dibra e Madhe), which is centred around the city of Debar in the Debar Municipality of North Macedonia, and Little Dibër (Albanian: Dibra e Vogël), which is centred around the city of Peshkopi and forms the basis of the modern Dibër County and Dibër municipality of Albania. It is inhabited by an Albanian majority on both sides of the border, with a significant Macedonian minority in Big Dibër.

As an ethnographic region, the Dibër Valley is home to numerous Albanian tribes, which form a geographical and tribal grouping known as Nëntë Malet e Dibrës (English: Nine Highlands of Dibër). Historically, the Albanian tribes of the region were divided into sub-regional highland tribal units known collectively as Malet e Dibrës and were closely associated with the neighbouring regions of Lurë, Mati, Golloborda, Reka and Topalltia.

== Geography ==
As a tribal region, the Dibër Valley sits along a portion of the Black Drin river valley that stretches from Luma and Arrëni tribal territory in the north to the town of Debar in the south. It borders the aforementioned Lura and Mati tribal regions to the west and numerous non-tribal territories to the east and south, including Golloborda, Reka and Topalltia.

The high-altitude valley is surrounded by even higher mountains on all sides: to the north is the Korab range, containing Mount Korab which, at 2,764 metres, is the highest point in both countries; the mountains on the other sides also exceed 2,000 metres. The Black Drin flows from the south through a narrow canyon into the valley and leaves it through a similarly steep canyon. Previously the river was notorious for annual floods, and as a result, there are no settlements near the river itself. Since the construction of a reservoir on the Macedonian side, the Debar Lake, the level of the river is regulated. The Dibër Valley is fertile. Wolves and bears are still found in the large forests of the valley. A large portion of the inhabitants work in agriculture.

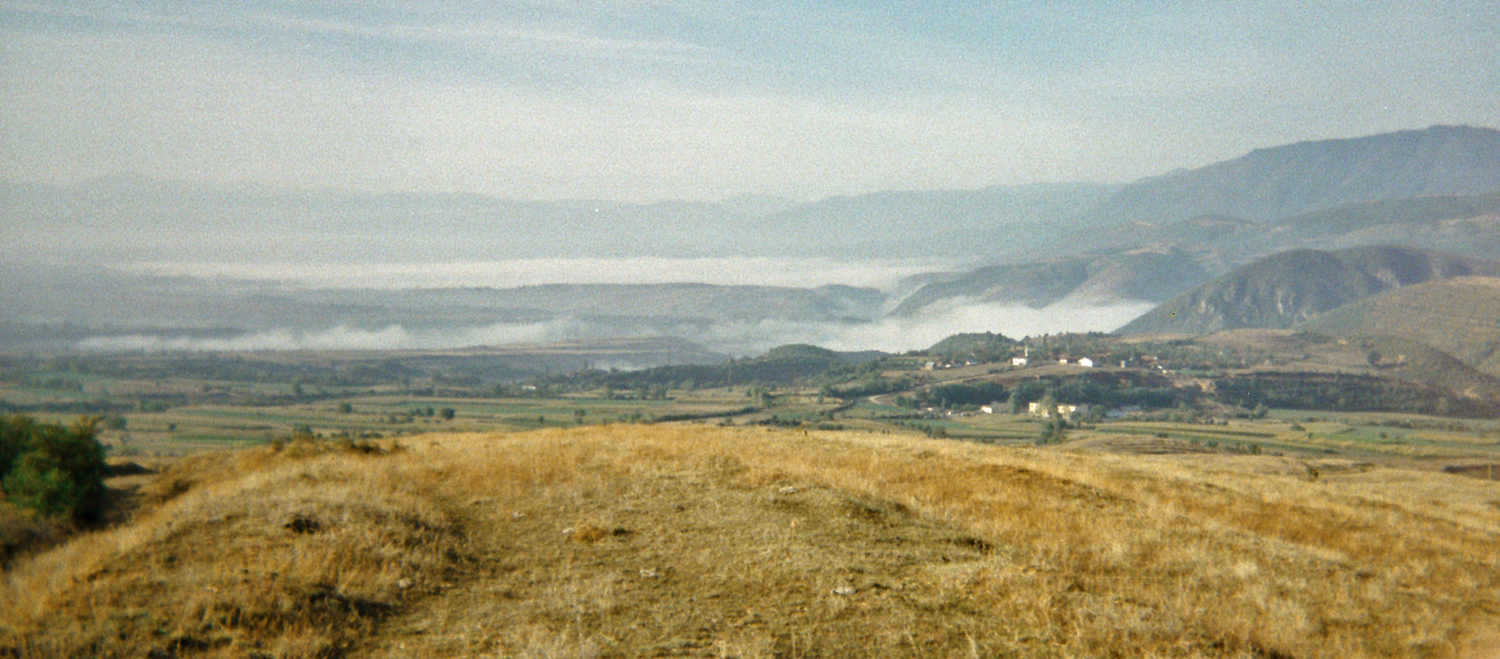
Little Dibër

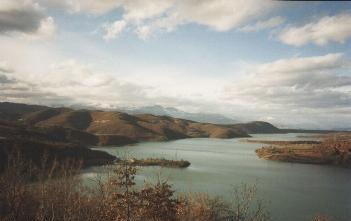
Reservoir on the Macedonian side (1986)

== History ==
=== Antiquity ===
Human activity in the Dibër Valley region can be traced back to the Neolithic. The territory that currently corresponds to the modern Dibër region was inhabited by the ancient Illyrian tribe of the Penestae. Multiple settlements from the Early Bronze Age, the Middle Bronze Age and the Late Bronze Age can be found in the vicinity of Dibra.

=== Middle Ages ===
The term 'Dibër' was mentioned in various forms by Greek and Roman authors, particularly in the form Deborus, and the toponym is yet again continuously recorded from the beginning of the 12th century CE onwards, also in various forms. During the Middle Ages, Dibra - which was under the control of Serbian ruler Prince Marko - was incorporated into the growing dominion of the Gropa family by 1371 when it was conquered by Andrea Gropa. Dibra would pass into the hands of the Kastrioti family, who held it until it was conquered by the Ottomans in 1395 and subsequently became the seat of the Sanjak of Dibra.

In 1440, Albanian lord Skanderbeg was appointed as the sanjakbey of the Sanjak of Dibra. During Skanderbeg's rebellion against the Ottomans, Dibra remained part of the League of Lezhë and was the site of numerous battles, including the Battle of Torvioll, the Battle of Otonetë, the First and Second Battle of Oranik and the Battle of Vajkal, all of which resulted in Albanian victories. Nonetheless, after Skanderbeg's death, the region would yet again fall into the hands of the Ottomans.

=== Early Ottoman Period ===
As indicated in the Ottoman defter of 1467, the Kaza of Dibra was divided into three nahiyes - Upper Dibra, Lower Dibra and Golloborda. The defter of 1467 contains fewer and poorer details compared to the defter of 1583, likely due to the effects of the 1466 Ottoman campaigns in the regions of Mat and Dibra. These campaigns, led by Mehmed II, culminated in massacres in the region of Çidhna and its surroundings that caused a demographic catastrophe. Villages were left with only 3-16 households as indicated in the defter of 1467.

Nevertheless, the defter of 1467 presents a rich corpus of distinctly Albanian names throughout the villages of Dibra. Even in the villages of the Golloborda nahiyah, where proximity to Slavic-speaking regions resulted in a greater presence of names with Slavic origin or form, many characteristically Albanian names appear, or Albanian names that have been adapted with Slavic suffixes. Over 30 villages of Dibra were registered as belonging to Ahmet Beg, the local Soubashi, whilst the other villages of Dibra were registered as belonging to different timariots. As none of the inhabitants of Dibra were Muslims during this time, the Ispendje tax was levied in all of the local villages.

During the second half of the 16th century, parts of Dibra were included as part of the Sanjak of Dukagjin. By the time of the defter of 1583, many villages of Dibra had become fully Islamised whilst others were part Christian and part Muslim, and some in Upper Dibra and Golloborda remained entirely Christian. Many peasants, lured by the easing of fiscal burdens, converted to Islam over a period of several decades, contributing to major religious changes in Dibra. Local village elites also converted to Islam for various political and economic reasons, thereby opening the path to integration into the Ottoman military-administrative and economic structures. The Ottoman campaign of Islamisation was more intense in Lower Dibra, likely due to the Kastrioti family's strong ties to the region. In fact, as a result of the Ottoman persecution in these areas, the villages of Kastriot and Kuke disappeared by the time of the 1583 defter.

As noted in the 1583 defter, some villages had reduced taxes due to their special status as derbend villages, performing guard duties in return for exemption from customary taxes. For example, the villages of Modriç, Zakmet, Zerqan and Zabzun in the nahiyah of Golloborda were responsible for guarding the caravan route from Manastir through Zerqan toward Lezhë, Shkodër and beyond. In the nahiyah of Lower Dibra, three villages - Muhurri, Bulaçi and Gardhi i Poshtëm, located near Çidhna - were tasked with monitoring the movement of residents from villages traditionally associated with Skanderbeg.

=== Late Ottoman Period ===
During the 18th and 19th centuries, Albanian villages in Dibra were known for their artisanal wood carving. In the late 19th century, the Sanjak of Dibra had a population of around 200,000, whilst the town of Dibër had a population of around 20,000. The Sanjak of Dibra was known as an unruly area that was dominated by the local tribes, who exercised their control over the mountains and much of the valley. These Gheg tribes, known as the Tigers of Dibra, followed the Kanun, governing themselves according to the Law of Skanderbeg.

After the collapse of the Ottoman Empire in Europe, the European great powers established the borders of the new Balkan states at the London Conference of 1912–13. As a result, the Dibër Valley was cut in half. The northwestern part, also known as the Little Dibër, was assigned to Albania. The Big Dibër (Albanian: Dibra e Madhe), around the city of Debar, went to the Kingdom of Serbia. The city thus lost a large part of its hinterland. Families were separated and the inhabitants of the Albanian state were no longer able to visit the market in Debar. On the Albanian side, the city of Peshkopi became the new regional centre, the capital of the modern Dibër County and Dibër municipality.

The majority of Dibër's inhabitants are Albanians, who speak a Gheg dialect and are traditionally Muslim. There is a Macedonian Slav minority on both sides of the border.
