= Suma (tribe) =

Region in Albania; historic Albanian tribe

The Suma are a historical Albanian tribe (fis) and tribal region in Pult of north Albania. During the Ottoman period it formed a single bajrak (military-administrative unit).

== Geography ==
Suma tribal territory is situated in the mountainous Pult region in the district of Shkodra, and is located around 20 km northeast of the city itself. It is on the western side of the upper Kir river. Suma tribal territory borders Kiri to the east, Xhani to the north, Rrjolli to the west, and Drishti to the south. Their main settlement is the village of Bruçaj (known previously as Suma).

== Origin ==
The majority of the Suma tribe believes that they hail from Mirdita, and that their ancestral forefathers are from the Oroshi tribe; therefore, the Suma are related to the Spaçi and Kushneni tribes. They would split into multiple branches in Bojët e Sumës, a location that is situated near the church of Xhani. Another part of Suma claims to have arrived from the tribal territory of the Kuči in eastern Montenegro. According to oral tradition these brotherhoods trace their ancestry back to two brothers; Dol and Pyl Kuçi. Dol is considered to have been the founder and forefather of Gurra and Dajcë, while Pyl founded Bukmirë. This oral tradition may in fact reflect their origin from the historical Bukumiri tribe.

== History ==
In 1332, a Demetrius Suma was recorded. A 1335 document of Tsar Dušan mentions a certain Petrus Suma and Marcus Suma living in the Albanian katun of Tuzi. Historically, the tribe has been of a Catholic majority with a substantial Muslim minority. An Austro-Hungarian census of 1918 recorded 95 households with a total of 641 inhabitants living in the settlements of Suma and Shakota as well as their surroundings. In 1911, the Suma tribe attempted an anti-Ottoman uprising but suffered retaliation from Ottoman troops, who plundered the village and burnt down many homes - the Suma tribe was destitute at this point. In 1685, a certain D. Luca Summa from Shkodra had his poem published in the Cuneus Prophetarum by Pjetër Bogdani.

== Sources ==
- Elsie, Robert (Apr 24, 2015). The Tribes of Albania: History, Society and Culture. Bloomsbury Publishing. ISBN 9780857725868.
