= Lepuroshi =

Albanian ancient tribe

The Lepuroshi (alternatively, Leporoshi, Lepurushi) were a historical Albanian tribe (fis) that inhabited the ethnographic region of Rrjolli in Malësia, northern Albania, during the Middle Ages.

== Etymology ==
The Lepuroshi derive their name from the Albanian lepurush, a variation of lepur ("hare") which denotes young hares. Lepur itself is ultimately derived from Latin leporem. In 1840, the French Huguenot geologist Ami Boué interpreted the name of the Lepuroshi (Leporosei) as "rabbit-eaters".

== History ==
The Lepuroshi are recorded as a community in the Venetian cadastre of 1416-17 for Scutari and its environs. In the register, the tribe had founded the settlement of Lepurosh (Leporonsi) in the Rrjolli Valley and formed three of the seven households attested; those of Jon, Aleks, and Benko Leporoshi. The village was also home to a certain Kjurko Tuzi from the Tuzi tribe. However, an Andrea Leporoshi is also recorded as among the inhabitants of the fortified town of Balec. A branch of the Lepuroshi also settled in the lowlands of Shkodra, where another Andrea Leporoshi is attested in Gleros (alternatively, Glerosh) near modern Beltojë.

The Lepuroshi are subsequently recorded in the Ottoman defter of 1485 alongside their settlement of Lepurosh. However, in this register, it appears that the Lepuroshi had grown as a community as they now dominated the village where all but three of the 15 household heads were from the Lepuroshi tribe. A certain Vlash Petali is recorded alongside the Lepuroshi in the village and was possibly connected to the nearby region of Kiri. The anthroponyms recorded in Lepurosh, and specifically among the Lepuroshi, were almost entirely Albanian in character (e.g., Gjergj, Gjon, Lekë, Llesh). With the implementation of the bajrak administrative-military unit and system in the highlands of Albania during the Ottoman period, the Lepuroshi were administratively incorporated into the Rrjolli where they formed a part of the tribal territory and a portion of the local modern population.

In 1505, Leka Lepuroshi (Lebronzi) and his three brothers were recorded as among the Albanian stratioti serving under Venetian command.

During the Ottoman period, a branch of the Lepuroshi appears to have migrated to and settled in Shëngjergj, east of Tirana. A document from 1645, held by the local Hoxha (earlier, Alsakaj) family of Shëngjergj, attests to a sipahi or timariot named Ali who held the village of Küperli. In corroboration with local oral traditions, the sipahi Ali was likely an ancestor and member of the Hoxha family which historically maintained the rank of sipahi and that their earliest patrilineal ancestor took the name Ali following his conversion to Islam. Subsequent male members of the family took the name in reference to their ancestor, the sipahi Ali of Küperli being among them. Family legends also maintain that the earliest name of the family, used prior to their conversion to Islam, was Lepuroshi. Micro-toponyms such as Kroi i Lepurit and Lepuj in Shëngjergj attests to this original family name. In the oral traditions of Shëngjergj, it is remembered that a sipahi named Ali, that can now be identified with Ali of Küperli, ousted another sipahi and member of the same family named Haxhi Sinani who held lands in Shëngjergj that would later be named as Qyperli Mahallasi following Ali's acquisition, likely a reference to his ownership of Küperli. Haxhi Sinani is believed to have fled south and founded the village of Sinanaj located north-west of Tepelenë. In Shëngjergj, the Dushaj, Altafa, Canej, Varrosi families claim to belong to the same fis as Haxhi Sinani.
