= Balec =

Coordinates: 42°11′56.39″N 19°28′46.24″E

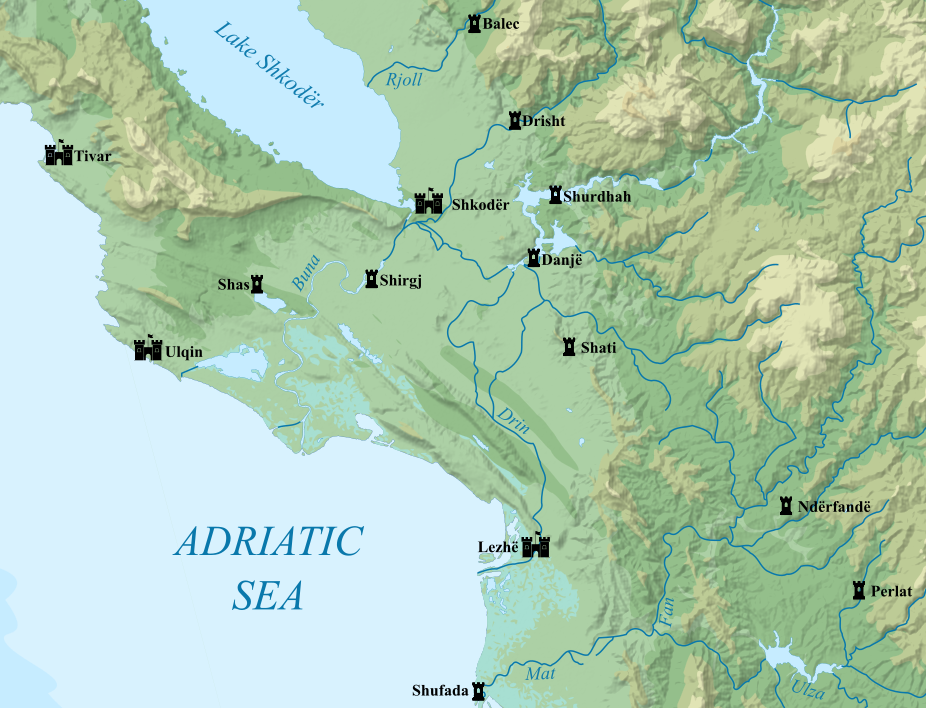
Balec and nearby towns

Balec (Albanian: Baleci) was a medieval fortified town near Shkodër in Albania. The settlement originated in Roman times. During Byzantine rule over the area, it was part of the Dyrrhachium theme. Later it was a seat of a župa of the Kingdom of Duklja, and later still of the Lordship of Zeta. Balec suffered much damage during the Second Scutari War between the Serbian Despotate and the Republic of Venice. After the Republic of Venice gained control over it at the beginning of the 15th century, its size was reduced to a small pronoia with only 25 houses, and the fortress was abandoned and fell to ruin. Skanderbeg's forces rebuilt the fortress during his war with Venice in 1448 and established a strong garrison in it, but the Venetian forces soon drove them away and demolished the fortress. Ottoman plans to rebuild Balec and populate it with Turkish settlers were never implemented and Balec remained in ruins, which can still be seen today.

== Name ==
The toponym Balec is part of a class of toponyms related to Illyrian-derived ballë (front). The hill under which the town is located is known as kodra e Balecit. Similar toponyms exist in the territories of Illyria and Iapygia (e.g. Balletium). The town is first attested by name in the 6th century. In 1062 the town's name is mentioned indirectly in papal correspondence as the seat of the bishopric of Balleacensis or Palachiensis. The Slavic Chronicle of the Priest of Duklja written mostly in the early 14th century mentions it as the seat of the župa of Barezi, a misspelling.

Renderings of modern languages include: Albanian Balec, Italian Balezo, Serbian Балеч (Baleč) or the rare rendering Балеш (Balesh). In medieval Venetian, several misspellings have been introduced in official documents including: Ballegium and Ballegio.

== History ==
=== Roman Empire ===
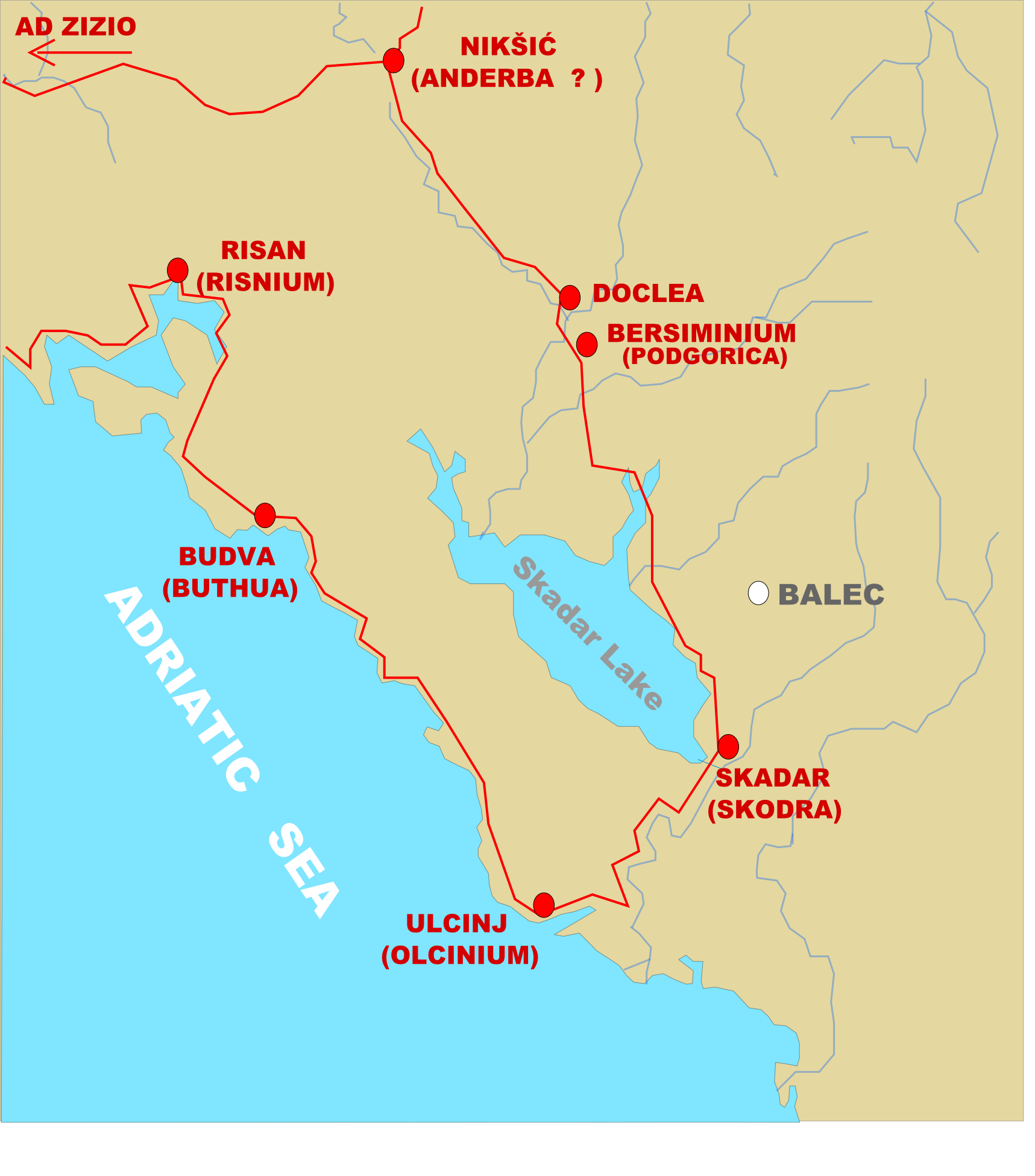
Ancient Roman road from Skodra to Doclea, and position of medieval Balec

Balec was built on the site of a former settlement of the Roman period, that was destroyed by Avars and Slavs. Its fortress has a Roman origin. Balec was near the road that led from Shkodër to Duklja and Onogošt (modern day Nikšić), near several important settlements and water resources.

=== Duklja and Zeta ===
Balec was part of Byzantine Dyrrhachium until the Kingdom of Duklja, under Stefan Vojislav (1018–1043) captured it . In the 12th century it was the seat of a župa. According to the Chronicle of the Priest of Duklja, after the death of Stefan Vojislav in 1044 control over Balec and the župa was inherited by his son Mihailo I Vojislavljević.

In the 14th century, control over the region, including Balec, passed to the Lordship of Zeta, ruled by the Balšić family.

=== Venetian Republic ===
At the beginning of the 15th century, the Venetian Republic took control of Balec, which became a pronoia, whose pronoiarios (the person to whom the pronoia was granted) lay under obligation to recognize the rights of the bishop of the Roman Catholic Diocese of Balecium, if were to return and claim them. Radiq Humoj, a member of the Humoj family, was appointed by the governor of Scutari as pronoier over Balec in period 1402—1403, which was confirmed by decision of Venetian Senate on 16 September 1404. The Venetian census of 1417 indicates that the Balec pronoia was directly subordinated to the governor of Scutari and had 25 houses.

After Radiq's death, the Venetian governor of Scutari gave the Balec pronoia to Radiq's brother Andrea (who was then voivoda of the area north of the Shkodër) and his son Kojaçin. Decision of Scutari's governor was confirmed by Venetian Senate on 13 February 1419.

==== Skanderbeg's rebellion ====
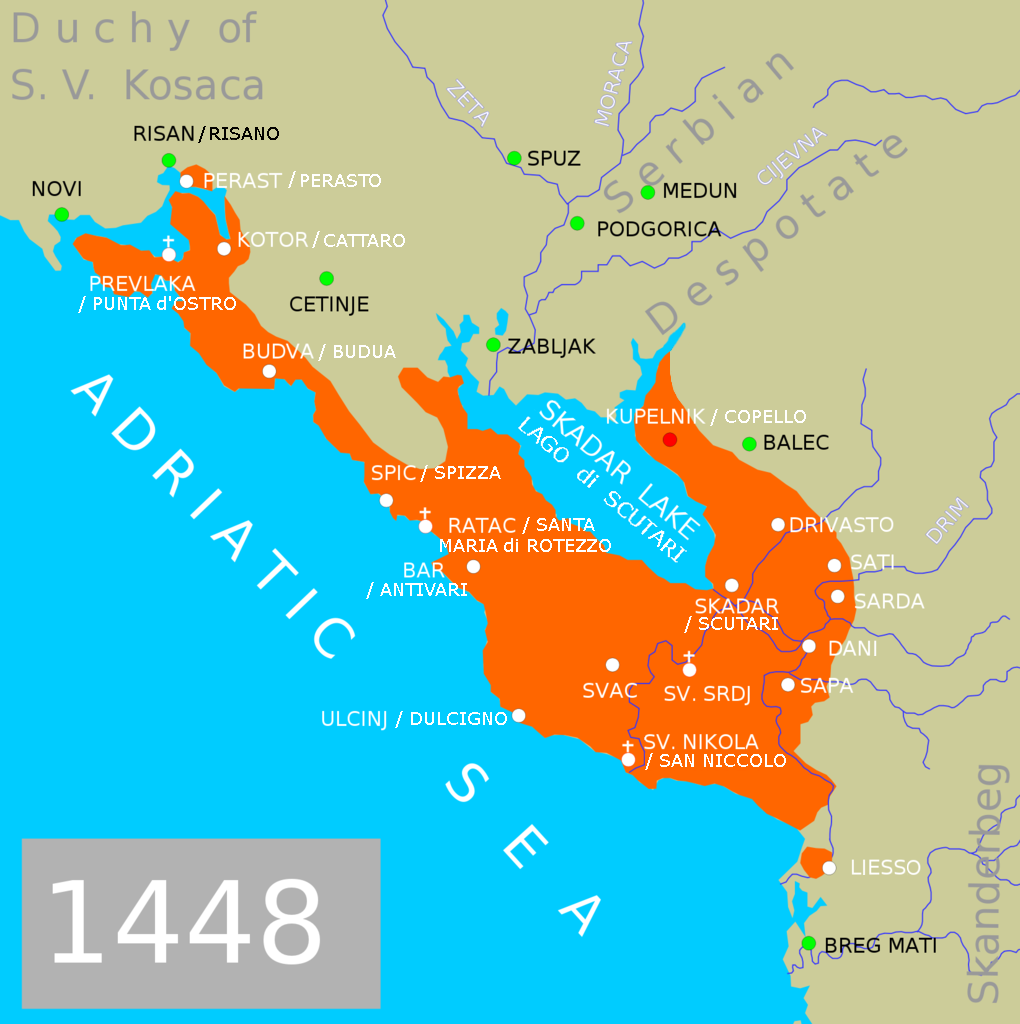
Position of Balec in 1448

In December 1447 Skanderbeg began his war against Venice and besieged Dagnum. When he realised that his siege was unsuccessful he ordered the rebuilding of the fortress of Balec, which was unoccupied and in ruins. The main purpose of placing a garrison at Balec was to cut the supply routes to besieged Dagnum and to gain control over the lands around Shkodër. The 2,000 soldiers of the Balec garrison were under the command of Skanderbeg's nephew Hamza Kastrioti and Marin Spani, but Kastrioti was ordered to attack Drivast, leaving Spani in sole command. Marin found the newly rebuilt fortress insecure and, when his relative Peter Spani informed him that a large Venetian force was heading there, he immediately retreated with his soldiers to Danj. The Venetian forces retook the fortress, burned the wooden parts and demolished the rebuilt walls. Andrea and Kojaçin Humoj, together with Simeon Vulkata, led the pro-Venetian alliance against Skanderbeg, fighting particularly fiercely for control over Balec and Drivast in 1447.

Although the Balec area was under firm Venetian control since the beginning of the 15th century, Balec slowly became impoverished and had ceased to exist as a town long before 1448, when the rebuilt fortress was destroyed by the Venetians and the town was already only a memory.

=== Aftermath ===
At the beginning of 1474 the whole region around Shkodër, including the abandoned Balec, came under Ottoman rule. According to some sources the Ottoman sultan had intentions to rebuild Podgorica and Balec in 1474 and to settle them with 5,000 Turkish families in order to establish an additional obstacle for cooperation of Crnojević's Zeta and besieged Venetian Shkodër. However the plans about Balec were not realized and later Marin Barleti described Balec as ruins.

== Demographics ==
The Venetian Cadastre of 1416-1417 recorded the household heads of Venetian-controlled settlements. The inhabitants of Balec are overwhelmingly Albanian as can be seen by their anthroponomy, as is the case with the villages in Balec's surroundings, and many of the surnames found in the settlement were also found in the rest of the regions surrounding Shkodra as well as Drisht itself. In total, 25 households were recorded in Balec during this time under the leadership of Andrea Humoj from the Albanian Humoj family. Kojaçin Humoj was mentioned as the landlord. The villages that depended on Balec as an administrative and religious centre include Zakoli (3 households), Braza (5 households), Dari (11 households), Lepuroshi (7 households), Shën Aleksandër (uninhabited at this time), Zamaraki (3 households), and Brokulk (uninhabited).

Multiple branches of Albanian tribes lived in Balec during the Venetian period as indicated by the cadastre of 1416-1417, such as a branch of the Lepuroshi, headed by an Andrea Lepuroshi, and a branch of the Albanian Kakarriqi tribe, headed by Dimitër Kakarriqi. Likewise, a branch of the Albanian Prekali tribe was also present in Balec during this time, headed by Petro Prekali, as was a branch of the Tuzi tribe headed by Zuan Tuzi. Balec also housed 8 Catholic priests.

Balec (attested as Balozi or Balvezi) is recorded in the Ottoman defter of 1485 for the Sanjak of Scutari where it appears to have been reduced in size with only 11 households inhabiting the town. The anthroponymy recorded was overwhelmingly Albanian in character and a branch of the Reçi tribe (fis) appears to have settled the town with a certain Gjergj, son of Reçi, appearing among the household heads.

== Religion ==
The Diocese of Balec was mentioned for the first time in 1062 by a request from Pope Alexander II directed to Pjetër, the Archbishop of Tivar, which oversaw the Diocese of Balec. Beginning form 1347, 13 total bishops are mentioned (11 by name, 2 anonymous) as serving the diocese of Balec during the Middle Ages. Aside from the bishops, multiple Albanian Catholic clerics are also mentioned in a variety of documents of the 14th-15th centuries, serving the Catholic populations of Balec and its surroundings. Balec had at least three churches; the cathedral dedicated to Saint Mary (Albanian: Katedralja e Shën Marisë së Balecit) where the bishop of the Diocese of Balec was centred, the Catholic church dedicated to Saint Alexander (Albanian: Kisha e Shën Lleshit) in the nearby village of Shën Aleksandër on the banks of the Rrjoll river, and the Catholic church dedicated to Saint Nicholas (Albanian: Kisha e Shën Kollit). Additionally, a monastery dedicated to Saint John (Albanian: Manastiri i Shën Gjonit të Shtojit) that initially belonged to the Benedictines was located nearby in Shtoj; this monastery was under the jurisdiction of the Diocese of Drisht before being passed over to the Diocese of Balec. The Cult of Saint Premte, which spread mainly amongst the highlander Albanian tribes around the valley of Rrjoll, was also present in the area up until the beginning of the 20th century.

In 1356, Bishop Andreas Citer complained that his bishopric was full of schismatics. The diocese had been laid waste and impoverished by "the schismatics of the kingdom of Rascia", who had completely destroyed the monastery situated 5000 paces from the cathedral. In response, Pope Innocent VI granted him in commendam, on 26 September of the same year, the aforementioned Benedictine monastery of Saint John in Shtoj (Albanian: Manastiri i Shën Gjonit të Shtojit) that was until then under the Diocese of Drisht. The monastery must've been quickly rebuilt, as it was again mentioned 20 years later when Pope Gregory XI ordered Archbishop Peter of Ragusa to select a Benedictine monk and appoint him as abbot of the monastery, since the previous abbot had died. It is during this time that the monastery would have been passed back over to the Diocese of Drisht.

Eventually, Balec must have ceased to exist as a town, so that, although bishops continued to be appointed to the see, by 1448, when even the fortress rebuilt by Skanderbeg was destroyed, the town was no more than a memory. The bishopric of Balecium, no longer a residential see, is today listed by the Catholic Church as a titular see.

The Orthodox presence in the area may be traced to the nearby village of Cupelnich, which was populated with inhabitants that had a large degree of Slavic Orthodox anthroponomy according to the Venetian cadastre. There were multiple Orthodox priests, and there are records about an Orthodox monastery in the village of Cupelnich itself (Latin: Copenico) which owned a mill on the river Rioli near Balec.

== Sources ==
- Božić, Ivan (1979). Nemirno pomorje XV veka (in Serbian). Beograd: Srpska književna zadruga. OCLC 5845972.
- Malaj, Edmond (2016). "Baleci në Mesjetë (The Medieval Balezo and its diocese during the Middle Ages)". Studime Historike (3–4).
- Serbian Academy of Science and Arts (1980). Glas (in Serbian). Vol. 319–323. Belgrade: Serbian Academy of Science and Arts. p. 43.
