= Plani (tribe) =

Region in Albania; historic Albanian tribe

The Plani are a historical Albanian tribe (fis) and region in Pult of north Albania. The Plani tribe is not a traditional fis in the sense of a community that claims paternal descent from one common ancestor; rather, it is polyphyletic. During the Ottoman period it formed a single bajrak (military-administrative unit).

== Geography ==
Plani tribal territory corresponds to the mountainous Pult region in the district of Shkodra, and it is situated at the upper end of the Kir river valley. They border Shala to the east, Boga to the north, Shkreli to the west, and Kiri and Xhani to the south. The main Plani settlements are the villages of Plan, Mëgulla and Gjuraj-Boks.

== Origins ==
Despite consisting of a single bajrak, the Plani tribe is considered to be a conglomeration of four different Albanian populations; one from the Kelmendi tribe, one from the Mërturi, one from the region of Malzi, and one from an indigenous anas population. The Plani in Gjuraj and part of Mëgulla are of Kelmendi origin from the village of Selcë, the Plani in Thana are from Mërturi, those in Gjinaj arrived from Malzi, and the anas population of the tribe is that of Boksh/Boks. The Plani of Boksh settled in the region prior to the Ottoman conquest of Albania, but were said to have been the group responsible for the downfall of the Castle of Boksh (Kalaja e Bokshit) by revealing the location of the castle's water supply to the besieging Ottomans.

According to local oral traditions, many of the brotherhoods of Plani trace their ancestry back to a man from Boksi who took a bride from Malësia (possibly Kelmendi). The couple had three sons; Prendi, Gjuri, and Manga. The three brothers would consequently father their own families and expand, founding the settlements and brotherhoods of Prendrejaj, Gjuraj, and Mëgulla. The Thani trace their patrilineal lineage back to a certain Gjin Berisha from Mërturi and, according to legend, took their name from the cornel plant (thanë in Albanian) under which one of their forefathers sought shelter during his first night in Plani.

== History ==
The native Boksi (alternatively, Boksa, Baksi) are attested in the Venetian cadastre of 1416-17 for Scutari and its environs as an Albanian tribal community spread across a number of settlements in northern Albania. A certain Pali Boksa is attested in the nearby settlement of Bishtrrjolla in the region of Rrjolli, while in Podgora a Nikolla Baksi is recorded as a pronoiar of the village alongside his brothers and others, including members of the Hoti tribe.

In the later Ottoman defter of 1485 for the Sanjak of Scutari, Plani appears as the settlement of Blanda in the nahiyah of Petrishpan-ili with 21 households that produced 1500 ducats per annum. The register attests to a dominance of Albanian personal names (e.g., Mali, Gjergji, Gjoni) and also identifies a branch of the Prekali tribe in the village with a certain Gjon son of Prekali being recorded. It is also made clear Plani was not yet a fully formed tribal territory as Mëgulla (Dugul) is recorded as a separate community in the region with 5 households that produced only 500 ducats per annum.

Plani is later recorded as Plandi Villa in 1628 and as Planti in 1671. In 1671–1672, the village of Plani was documented by Pietro Stefano Gaspari (an apostolic visitor) as having 52 homes and 312 inhabitants. In the first half of the 19th century, French consul Hyacinthe Hecquard reported that the Plani tribe consisted of 180 houses 1,135 inhabitants. In 1918, an Austro-Hungarian census recorded the Plani tribe as having 171 households with 980 inhabitants. During a conflict with Montenegro, the Plani standard-bearer was killed and the flag of the Plani was seized by a warrior from Gimaj in Shala - this shamed the Plani as their flag was in the possession of a family in Gimaj.

== Religion ==
Historically, the Plani tribe has been primarily Catholic with a Muslim minority. Saint Anthony the Abbot (Shna Ndou, Shnou) is the patron saint of the Catholics of Plani, with the feast day being on the 16th-17 January. The Catholic parish of Plani dates to 1839. In the 17th century, there was a stone church in Plani dedicated to Shna Ndou - this church also served the villages of Bukëmira and Dajca, which lacked their own church.
