= Vela (tribe) =

Region in Albania; historic Albanian tribe

The Vela are a historical Albanian tribe (fis) and tribal region in the districts of Lezha and Mirdita of northern Albania. It is one of the four traditional bajraks of the Highlands of Lezha (Malësia e Lezhës), alongside the Bulgëri, Kryezezi and Manatia.

== Geography ==
Vela tribal territory is located in the Vela river basin, which flows to the east of Mount Vela and into the Fan river. Vela borders Kryezezi tribal territory to the south, Manatia tribal territory and the Zadrima region to the west, and Dibrri tribal territory in Mirdita to the north and east. The main Vela settlements are Rreja e Velës to the east of the Vela mountain and Vela on the western slope.

== Etymology ==
The Vela tribe derive their name from the nearby Mount Vela (Mali i Velës, 1,770m altitude).

== History ==
First recorded as Monti di Velia in 1621, the Vela tribe are the third Bajrak of the Lezha Highlands. It was mentioned as Velia in 1629, Monte di Veglia and Veglia in 1641, Vellia in 1694 and Veglia in 1866, when it was estimated to have 108 households. They joined the Mirdita tribe in 1818 along with the rest of the tribes of the Highlands of Lezha. In 1905, the Vela tribe was estimated to have 74 households. In 1918, the Vela tribe were officially recorded as having 130 households with 840 inhabitants. In 1909, chieftainship of the tribe was within Rreja e Velës, and the title of Bajraktar (chieftain) was held by a certain Ndue Kole Toma. The Vela tribesmen were renowned for their daringness.

== Religion ==
The Vela are a Catholic tribe, just like all tribes in Mirdita and the Lezha Highlands. Multiple churches exist in the tribal territory - these include the Church of the Holy Saviour (Kisha e Shën Shelbuemit) first mentioned in 1636 (although the present building dates to the early twentieth century), the Church of Saint Veneranda (Kisha e Shën Prendës) first mentioned in 1629, the Church of Saint Alexander (Kisha e Sh'Llezrit) on the peak of Mount Vela which was visited by the local tribes in an annual pilgrimage, and the Church of Saint John (Kisha e Shën Gjinit) to the south of the Vela river on the hill of Malung.
