= Kakarriqi =

Kakarriqi (Kakarići, Cyrillic: Какаричи, or Chacharucha and Cataruci in Italian) was an Albanian tribe (fis) of the Middle Ages. They inhabited the Mbishkodër plain, stretching up into the grasslands of Zeta.

== Toponyms ==
There are multiple examples of the term Kakarriqi being used as a toponym. The toponym of Kakrok or Kakruk of Skrapari could perhaps be traced to the Kakarriqi tribe. There exists a 'Kakarriqi' toponym (labelled Cacaricchi in 1610) between Shkodra and Lezhë, as well as a hill called 'Kakarriqi' in Suma and a village in Mazrek of the same name; Mazreku also contains the toponym of 'Kakaruka', which may be related.

== History ==
In 1304, the Kakarriqi appear as the Cataruci in Italian sources and were described as a tribe who submitted to the Kingdom of Naples. In the first half of the 15th century, the Venetian Cadastre of Shkodra mentions the present-day village of Kakarriq near Lezhë, as well as the families of Andrea Kakarriqi the younger in the village of Dajçi, Bitër Kakarriqi in the village of Pulaj near Velipojë and Dimitër Kakarriqi in the town of Balec. In 1455 the Kakarriqi are mentioned as one of the communities that entered into an agreement with the Venetians.

In 1482, a certain Chacharucha was documented as the leader of the stratioti in Durrës. In the 1485 cadastre of Shkodra, the old village of Kakarriq was registered with Jon Neraçi as its head. The village possessed 13 plots of arable land, given to Jon Neraçi as a concession by Benedict Benedict Contarini under the condition that each year five sacks of millet would be paid to him. The register of the village also lists Gjergj, Jon and Petro, all with the surname Kakarriqi. The plot of land of Kakarriq Duz is also mentioned along with two families with the surname Kakarriqi in the villages of Shënkoll and Kurta. In the 16th century the Kakarriq tribe had greatly increased, with the village of Kakarriq numbering 248 Christian houses, 21 bachelors and 2 Muslim families in 1582. In addition there was already a second village named Kakarriq or Borad, which as the name suggests, was inhabited by members of this community, and a third village named Kakarriq registered together with the village of Stanković in the area of Podgorica, where according to the agreement of 1455, lay the realm of the Kakarriqi. It is believed that this village would be the territory where the branch of the Kakarriq community mentioned in the agreement between Venice and the Zeta tribes was established. The hamlet of Kakarićka Gora, a rounded elevation rising above the surrounding land in modern Podgorica, corresponds to the village of Stanković.

Mariano Bolizza in his voyage in the area in 1614 recorded that Gjon Saliki held 150 houses of the Cacharichi, with 400 soldiers.

== Distribution ==
Existence of settlements named Kakarriq in Zeta and Shkodër shows that this community has migrated between these two areas, and that they served it as summer and winter pastures for livestock. Such patterns of movement indicate a pastoralist way of life.
