= Oroshi (tribe) =

Albanian tribe

The Oroshi tribe is an Albanian tribe and one of the bajraks of the ethnographic Mirdita region in northern central Albania. The Oroshi tribe was one of the three traditional bajraks of Mirdita, which has now increased to five.

== Geography ==
Oroshi tribal territory is situated on the left (south and south-eastern) bank of the Lesser Fan River in the Mirdita region. Oroshi territory borders the Kushneni tribe to the west, the Spaçi and Fani tribes to the north, the Lurë tribe to the east, and the Kthella and Selita tribes to the south. The mains ettlements of the Oroshi tribe are Orosh and Mashtërkor.

== Origins ==
The ancestral father of the Oroshi tribe was Mark Biba, son of Bib Kola. Mark was the brother of Dodë Biba, the ancestral father of the Spaçi tribe, and Gjin Biba, the ancestral father of the Kushneni tribe. As such, the Oroshi tribe was one of the three traditional bajraks of Mirdita before the number increased to five. All three sons hailed from the Pashtrik region near Gjakova in Kosovo, from where they migrated to what is now Oroshi tribal territory in Mirdita.

The Oroshi also contain some anas (indigenous) brotherhoods that are not descended from Mark Biba, such as the Skanda and the Çoku. The Çoku consist of a local branch that originates from Pal Çoku of Çokaj near Lajthiza as well as the Pulaj brotherhood of the Selita tribe.

== History ==
The term 'Oroshi' is first mentioned as Orosci in an Italian report in 1671. It is further mentioned as Orosci, Orossi or in a variety of maps and ecclesiastical reports in 1688 with 30 homes, 1689 and 1703. At one point in time, the Oroshi tribe practiced semi-nomadic transhumance, living in mountain settlements only during the summer. Such settlements include Nënshejti and Lajthiza, which eventually became permanent year-round settlements for some families but remained summer settlements (or thana verore) for others. The winter settlements of the Oroshi consisted of Bukmirë, Qafëmollë, Livadhes, the western half of Ndërfushaz and half of Shpërdhazë.

In 1881, it was recorded with 1,500-1,800 members, and in 1895, they were recorded with 80 homes. In an Austro-Hungarian census taken in Albania during 1918, the Oroshi tribe were recorded as having 156 households with a total of 1,160 inhabitants. This consisted of the settlement and surroundings of Orosh.

The settlement of Orosh was home to the "princes" of Mirdita, the Gjomarkaj (or Gjonmarkaj) family which held hereditary leadership over the tribes of Mirdita up until World War II and the ensuing Communist period of Albania, and was thus considered the capital of the Mirdita region where issues of tribal importance were discussed. This, along with the fact that the other leading local authority in Mirdita (the abbot of the Abbey of Saint Alexander) was also in Orosh, allowed the Oroshi to maintain their importance in the region despite being the least numerous of the tribes of Mirdita.

== Religion ==
The Oroshi tribe is traditionally an entirely Catholic tribe. Its patron saint is Saint Alexander (Shën Llesh), to whom the most notable church in Mirdita - the old Abbey of Saint Alexander - was dedicated. This abbey is located in the settlement of Orosh and was first mentioned in 1313, supposedly having been founded by the Benedictines and the Basilians.

== Relation with other tribes ==
Due to the fact that the Oroshi tribe is one of the original three bajraks of Mirdita alongside the Kushneni and Spaçi tribes, members of the three tribes are consanguineous and therefore do not intermarry with each other. Members of the Oroshi can, however, intermarry with members of the Dibrri or Fani, the other two bajraks of Mirdita. In the 1860s, it was noted that although the Oroshi tribe had the lowest population and manpower of all the tribes in Mirdita, they still held general command over all of the bajraks of Mirdita. Historically, the Oroshi and the neighbouring Lura tribe had many conflicts over their borders, which ultimately created a rivalry between the two. Nonetheless, the two tribes also engaged in regular diplomatic relations, marrying women from one another's tribes even after the conversion of the majority of Lura to Islam.
