= Dibrri =

Albanian tribe

The Dibrri tribe is an Albanian tribe and one of the five bajraks of the ethnographic Mirdita region in northern central Albania.

== Geography ==
Dibrri tribal territory stretches across the counties of Lezhë and Shkodër. The northern portion occupies the upper basin of the Gjadër River which flows into the Drin River, whilst the southern part occupies the basin of the Dibrri River, a tributary of the Greater Fan River. Dibrri tribal territory borders the Spaçi tribe to the north, the Kushneni tribe to the east, Vela to the south and the Zadrima region to the west.

== Origins ==
The Dibrri tribe is made up of multiple brotherhoods of various origins, and is said to be partially derived from Tosk Albanian regions in southern Albania. For example, the Kuqi brotherhood of Dibrri considers itself a relative of the Krasniqi tribe of the Gjakova Highlands and traditionally claim to have originated from there.

== History ==
Dibrri may correspond to the Deberina, a region mentioned in the Muzaka chronicles of 1510 by Gjon Muzaka as belonging to Skanderbeg. The term Dibrri occurs as Dibri in an Ottoman document of 1571, and a document dated to 1621 mentions Dibrri as including the heavily mountainous part of the Diocese of Lezhë. Dibrri was further mentioned multiple times in a variety of documents throughout the 1600s. In the late 17th century, the Dibrri paid tribute to the Ottomans who controlled Albania at this point in time, but still exercised autonomy and self-government.

Unlike the Spaçi, Oroshi and Kushneni tribes, the Dibrri are not one of the three original bajraks of Mirdita, having been incorporated into the group after 1812 when Mustafa Pasha Bushatli granted it as a bajrak to the ruling Gjomarkaj clan of Mirdita as compensation for a renounced hakmarrje. Prior to this, the bajrak of Dibrri was commanded by the beys of Shkodër and justice was locally administered by the chief of the Oroshi and a Boluk-bashi appointed by the governor of the province. The last bey was driven out for having burned two Mirditors convicted of theft at the stake and was not replaced.

In 1881, the Dibrri numbered to 800 houses with 5574 inhabitants, with its traditional meeting place at Dardha e Males in Sukaxhi. In the Austro-Hungarian census of Albania in 1918, the Dibrri tribe were recorded as having 800 households and a total of 5,774 inhabitants in the settlements and surroundings of Kaçinar, Fregna, Gryka e Gjadrit, Kaluer, Kalivaç, Kashnjet, Kashnjet-Kaftalla, Korthpula, Korthpula-Kaftalla, Rras, Mnella, Sukaxhia, Ungrej, Tejkodra, Vrith and Vig. In the 1950s, its bajraktar (chieftain) was Jak Frroku from Kashnjet.

== Religion ==
The Dibrri are an entirely Catholic tribe, and their patron saint is Saint Michael. Dibrri was the seat of a parish of the Diocese of Lezhë, Shëngjergj, which was called Giunali or Giunola in 17th century reports and Dibrri in the 18th century onwards.

== Relation with other tribes ==
Since the Dibrri are not one of the three original bajraks of Mirdita (Spaçi, Kushneni and Oroshi), they are not consanguineous with these tribes and can therefore intermarry with them.
