= Bulgëri =

Region in Albania; historic Albanian tribe

The Bulgëri are a historical Albanian tribe (fis) and tribal region in the districts of Lezha and Mirdita of northern Albania. It is one of the four traditional bajraks of the Highlands of Lezha (Malësia e Lezhës), alongside the Kryezezi, Vela and Manatia.

== Geography ==
Bulgëri tribal territory is situated along the banks of the lower Fan and Mat rivers, from Milot to Rubik. It is bordered by the Manatia tribal region to the west, the Kryezezi tribal region to the north, the Kthella tribal region to the east and the Mat river to the south. Their main settlements include Fang, Bërzana, Fierza, Rasfik and Bulgër (now Katundi i Vjetër).

== Etymology ==
The tribal name and toponym Bulgër (and its local dialectal form, Bulgjër) is derived from the Albanian bujgër referring to Macedonian oak (Quercus trojana) which grow in abundance in the region. Marin Barleti labels the region as mons Bulgari in his work, with the form Bulgari likely representing the toponym's original form in Old Albanian as the unstressed vowel /a/ would later be reduced to /ë/, creating the modern forms of Bulgër, Bulgjër, etc.

== History ==
The villages of Bërzana and Rasfik (Fiku) are both attested in the Ottoman defter of 1467 as hass-ı mir-liva properties in the vilayet of Dimitri Gjonima. Bërzana only had a single household represented by Peter Mirdida, while Rasfik had a total of six represented by the following household heads: Mëhill Suma, Lazar Stojani, Dimitri Kasini, Gjon Balkosi, Lazar Plasha, and Benk Bardi.

In 1640 the region is described as belonging to the Diocese of Kruja and had a total of 364 inhabitants. It occurs as the toponym Bulgari in 1866 with an estimated population of 97 households. It was estimated to have 110 households in 1905, and 122 households with 769 inhabitants in 1918. The Bulgëri are a Catholic tribe, like the rest of the Highlands of Lezha, and joined the Mirdita tribe in 1818 along with the rest of the tribes of the Highlands of Lezha.
