= Pamalioti =

Albanian tribe

The Pamalioti were a medieval Albanian tribe and family that lived between Lake Skadar and the Adriatic Sea, in the region called Zabojane (including Ulcinj), and were vassals to the Serbian Despotate and then the Republic of Venice in Venetian Albania.

== History ==
The tribe lived between Lake Skadar and the Adriatic Sea. According to Šufflay, there are in Drivast references to patrician (noble) families of purely Albanian origin (Sca * pudar, Precali ("Prekali")), as well as in Ulcinj (1376 Maliocus ("Maloku")), which also mentions an old nobility called Pamalioti. The leader was titled vojvoda, and he commanded the whole tribe. The tribe was forced to leave their home upon aligning themselves with the Venetians. They participated in the Second Scutari War. They received full nobility (patrician) status in 1553.

== Members ==
- John / Johanne
- Boico (1458)
- George / Giorgio (1545)
- Nicholas / Nicolaus / Nicolai
- Paul
