= Spaçi =

Albanian tribe

The Spaçi or Spaqi tribe is an Albanian tribe and one of the bajraks of the ethnographic Mirdita region in northern central Albania. The Spaçi tribe were one of the three traditional bajraks of Mirdita, which has now increased to five.

== Geography ==
Spaçi tribal territory is situated in the Mirdita municipality as well as the Gjegjan subdivision of Pukë municipality. Spaçi borders the Kabashi, Puka, Dibrri and Kushneni tribes to the west, the Thaçi tribe to the north, the Mali i Zi and Fani tribes to the east, and the Oroshi tribe to the south. The main settlements of the Spaçi tribe are Fushë-Arrëz, Gojan, Kalivare, Gjegjan, Dom, Kimëz and Spaç.

== Origins ==
The ancestral father of the Spaçi tribe was Dodë Biba, son of Bib Kola. Dodë was the brother of Mark Biba, the ancestral father of the Oroshi tribe, and Gjin Biba, the ancestral father of the Kushneni tribe. As such, Spaçi was one of the three traditional bajraks of Mirdita before the number increased to five. All three sons hailed from the Pashtrik region near Gjakova in Kosovo, from where they migrated to what is now Oroshi tribal territory in Mirdita.

== History ==
The term 'Spaçi' occurs as 'Spacci' in the 1866 memoir of French diplomat Emile Wiet. The tribe's traditional meeting place was in Kalivari. In 1892, the tribe's bajraktar was Ndoc Ndreca, the lieutenant of the kaymakam of Mirdita.

In 1903, Austrian engineer Karl Steinmetz recorded that the Spaçi consisted of 650 families. In a census taken in Albania in 1918 during the period of Austro-Hungarian administration, the population statistics of the Spaçi tribe consisted of 4,230 inhabitants in 598 households. These statistics covered the following settlements and their surroundings: Breg, Doç, Gjegjan, Gojan, Gomsiqja, Kalivarja, Kimza, Kisha e Arstit, Lumbardha, Mesul, Qafa e Malit, Shkoza, Spaç and Tuç.

== Religion ==
The Spaçi tribe is traditionally an entirely Catholic tribe, whose patron saint is Saint Nicholas.

== Relation with other tribes ==
Due to the fact that the Spaçi tribe is one of the original three bajraks of Mirdita alongside Kushneni and Oroshi, members of the three tribes are consanguineous and therefore do not intermarry with each other. Members of the Spaçi can, however, intermarry with members of the Dibrri or Fani, the other two bajraks of Mirdita.

== Notable people ==
- Valentin Spaqi, Kosovan basketball player
- Elizabeta Spaqi (sq), Kosovan actress
