= Kushneni =

Albanian tribe

The Kushneni or Kuzhneni tribe are an Albanian tribe and one of the traditional bajraks of the Mirdita region in northern central Albania. The Kushneni tribe were one of the three traditional bajraks of Mirdita, which has now increased to five.

== Geography ==
Kushneni tribal territory is situated in the Mirditë municipality, County of Lezhë, north central Albania. It is centred along the basin of the Greater Fan River and extends southwards to the Lesser Fan River. It is bordered by Kthella to the south, Oroshi to the southeast, Spaçi to the north and east, and Dibrri to the west. The main Kushneni settlements are Ndërfana, Gëziq, Blinisht, Pëshqesh and Simon. Kushneni tribal territory consists of the central part of the Fan i Gojanit and Shperlasa valleys, as well as the right bank of the Fan i Fandit.

== Origins ==
The ancestral father of the Kushneni tribe was Gjin Biba, brother to Mark Biba and Dodë Biba, the ancestral fathers of Oroshi and Spaçi tribes respectfully. These three tribes formed the three original bajraks of Mirdita and therefore do not marry with each other due to their blood relations. Gjin and his two brothers are the sons of Bib Kola, and all three sons hailed from the Pashtrik region near Gjakova in Kosovo, from where they migrated to what is now Oroshi tribal territory in Mirdita.

== History ==
Kushneni was first mentioned in a 1795 report as Cuscnen, again as Cusneni in 1866 and as Cusceni and Cusneni 1928. In 1881, it numbered to 3,600-4,000 inhabitants, and was already a bajrak by this point. In 1918, there were 318 households with 2,430 inhabitants in Kushneni territory. Their traditional meeting place is in Sh'Pal (the ancient abbey of Saint Paul), which is also the main meeting place for Mirdita in its entirety. The bajraktar (flagbearer, chieftain) of the Kushneni tribe in 1931 was Ndrekë Bajraktari, and in 1956 it was Ndue Bajraktari.

== Religion ==
The Kushneni are traditionally an exclusively Catholic tribe, and their patron saint is Saint Stephen.

== Relation with other tribes ==
Due to being blood related to the Oroshi and Spaçi tribes, with whom they form the three original bajraks of Mirdita, marriage is not permitted between members of these tribes. Additionally, they hold themselves to be related to the Shala and Shoshi tribes and therefore do not intermarry with these tribes either. The Kushneni would regularly marry with the Dibrri tribe.
