= Manatia =

Region in Albania; historic Albanian tribe

The Manatia (also Manatija) are a historical Albanian tribe (fis) and tribal region in the district of Lezha of northern Albania. It is one of the four traditional bajraks of the Highlands of Lezha (Malësia e Lezhës), alongside the Kryezezi, Vela and Bulgëri.

== Geography ==
Manatia tribal territory is situated in the mountainous Highlands of Lezha, east of the city of Lezha. It is bordered by the Vela, Kryezezi and Bulgëri tribes to the east, the Mat river to the south, and the Zadrima-Lezha lowlands to the west and north. Their main settlements include Manatia, Grykë-Manati, Lalm-Lukaj and Kapruell (now Prull).

== History ==
The village of Kapruell or Prull (Kaprul) is recorded in the Ottoman defter of 1467 as a hass-ı mir-liva property in the vilayet of Dimitri Gjonima. The village had a total of five households represented by the following household heads: Mihail Gjonshi, Gjergj Skuçi, Lesh Kaqi, Andrija Kurtisi, and Gjin Shtepko.

Manatia first appears as the toponym and parish Emanatia in 1621 in the ecclesiastical report of Benedetto Orsini Ragusino; Manatia in 1672 and 1866, and Manattia in 1928. In the 1860s, they had an estimated population of 82 households, and 75 households in 1905. In 1918, they were recorded as having 96 households with 629 inhabitants. They joined the Mirdita tribe in 1818 along with the other three bajraks of the Lezha Highlands.

== Religion ==
Like the rest of the tribes in the Highlands of Lezha, the Manatia are a Catholic tribe. On the left bank of the Manatia creek above Grykë-Manati, there was a Church of Saint Michael that dated to the early 20th century.
