= Rrjolli =

Northern Albanian tribe and region

The Rrjolli is a historical Albanian tribe (fis) and region in Malësia of north Albania. The tribal region is centred along the banks of the Rrjoll river that stems from Mount Bishkaz and empties into Lake Shkodër. The Rrjolli tribe is not a traditional fis in the sense of a community that claims paternal descent from one common ancestor; rather, it is polyphyletic. During the Ottoman period it formed a single bajrak (military-administrative unit).

== Etymology ==
The name of the tribe, their region and their river seems to be derived from the Latin rivulus, meaning 'river'.

== Geography ==
The Rrjolli tribal region is located around 15 km east of Koplik. Rrjolli borders the Shkreli to the north, the Plani, Xhani, Suma and Mëgulla past Mount Bishkaz to the east, and the Lohja, Reçi and Grizha tribes to the northwest. Most of the Rrjolli settlements are located on the left side of the river, along the northern slopes of Mount Maranaj. The Rrjolli tribe occupies the Rrjoll valley between Mali i Kurrilës to the west, Tarabosh to the north, Mali i Bishkazit and Maranaj to the east.

== Origins ==
Rrjolli is not a tribe of common patrilineal ancestry; it is made up of different brotherhoods and lineages. According to Giuseppe Valentini, Rrjolli can be divided into two main groups: the brotherhoods who arrived from the tribal territory of the Kuči in eastern Montenegro during the 16th or 17th century, and the anas who represent the native population of the region. Among the anas are the Çangaj, Keqani, Kokaj, Toskaj and Vitaj. Alternatively, the French consul Hyacinthe Hecquard (1814–1866) recounted an oral tradition which maintained that the Rrjolli trace their ancestry back to two families from Drisht. The legend states that the two families had fled Drisht prior to the Ottoman siege of the citadel in hopes of escaping persecution and conversion to Islam.

Several Albanian tribes inhabited Rrjolli during the Middle Ages up until the Ottoman period, when they were grouped into a single military-administrative unit. These include the Egçi (Egreshi), Lepuroshi, and Linaj (Feralinaj). The Dara tribe also inhabited Rrjolli in the Middle Ages. The Dara family was one of the first to migrate from Albania to Italy and Greece after Skanderbeg's death. When they migrated to Greece they named their settlement Dara after their own surname. The Dara family in southern Italy exist as a part of the Arbëreshë community in Palazzo Adriano, a town in Sicily. Gabriele Dara, was an Arbëreshë politician and poet of the 19th century. He is regarded as one of the early writers of the Albanian National Awakening.

== History ==
In the Venetian cadastre of 1416-17 for Scutari and its environs, Rrjolli (Rioli) appears as a settlement split between the administrative authority of Bolca (now in Reçi) and Lohja (Logoan). The village had a total of 11 households and was not inhabited by a single fis, in the part within Bolca a branch of the Shkreli had settled while in the part under Lohja a branch of the Gruda (Jon Gruda) was settled. In the latter part of the village a certain Mihal Viti is recorded and was likely an ancestor of the modern Vitaj brotherhood. In the same register, the settlement of Bishtrrjolla is also attested as led by Stefan Spani and with 9 households. Among those, two of the households were from the Marsheni tribe (Dabesej and Petro Marsheni) while one also belonged to the Hoti (Radogost Hoti).

Rrjolli appears again in the Ottoman defter of 1485 for the Sanjak of Scutari. In the register, it appears as the village of Rijol which had 32 households and produced a total of 1510 ducats per annum. The personal names recorded are overwhelmingly Albanian in character. Likewise Bisht Rjola (alternatively, Barsh) is also recorded, this time with 15 households, two of which were still from the Marsheni (Gjin and Marin Marshejni). Other villages now within Rrjolli, such as Kurta and Lepurosh, are recorded in the register.

Rrjolli (Riolo) appears in a report of 1671 written by Stefano Gaspari as a settlement with 20 homes and 156 inhabitants headed by a certain Ndre Mida. The village had a church dedicated to the Ascension of Jesus. Later in the 19th century Hyacinthe Hecquard recorded that Rrjolli was one bajrak and had two hamlets. It had a population of 1600, roughly 1240 of whom were Catholic in faith. In the second half of the 19th century, the local Pasha had burned down some of the Rrjolli homes due to inter-religious conflict between the tribe; some Muslim members damaged a Christian cemetery and destroyed a cross that the Christians had set up along the path, and the Christians retaliated by throwing a dead pig into the mosque and painted crosses on its walls with the pig's blood. Later censuses from the 20th century, conducted by the Austro-Hungarian authorities, showed that Rrjolli had a population of between 1530 and 1560, 1200 were Muslim and only 360 Catholic.

The original bajraktars of Rrjolli came from the Catholic Kokaj, however, due to their support of the Dervishi family against the Bushati of Shkodra, their position was given to the Muslim Kurtaj.

== Distribution ==
Historically, numerous Rrjolli families would spend winters on the coast that lies between Shëngjin and the river Buna, sharing pastureland in Mali i Rrencit with Shkreli and Kelmendi tribes. Many Rrjolli men worked as bakers in Shkodër.
