= Albanian tribes =

Historical Albanian social structure

The Albanian tribes (Albanian: fiset shqiptare) form a historical mode of social organization (farefisní) in Albania and the southwestern Balkans characterized by a common culture, often common patrilineal kinship ties and shared social ties. The fis (Albanian definite form: fisi; commonly translated as "tribe", also as "clan" or "kin" community) stands at the center of Albanian organization based on kinship relations, a concept that can be found among southern Albanians also with the term farë (Albanian definite form: fara).

Inherited from ancient Illyrian social structures, Albanian tribal society emerged in the early Middle Ages as the dominant form of social organization among Albanians. The development of feudalism came to both antagonize it, and slowly integrate aspects of it in Albanian feudal society, as most noble families themselves came from these tribes and depended on their support. This process stopped after the Ottoman conquest of Albania and the Balkans in the late 15th century and was followed by a process of strengthening of the tribe (fis) as a means of organization against Ottoman centralization particularly in the mountains of northern Albania and adjacent areas of Montenegro.

It also remained in a less developed system in southern Albania where large feudal estates and later trade and urban centres began to develop at the expense of tribal organization. One of the most particular elements of the Albanian tribal structure is its dependence on the Kanun, a code of Albanian oral customary laws. Most tribes engaged in warfare against external forces like the Ottoman Empire. Some also engaged in limited inter-tribal struggle for the control of resources.

Until the early years of the 20th century, Albanian tribal society remained largely intact until the rise to power of the communist regime in 1944, and is considered to be the only example of a tribal social system with tribal chiefs and councils, blood feuds and oral customary laws to survive in Europe until the middle of the 20th century.

== Terminology ==
Fundamental terms that define Albanian tribal structure are shared by all regions. Some terms may be used interchangeably with the same semantic content and other terms have a different content depending on the region. No uniform or standard classification exists as societal structure showed variance even within the same general area. The term fis is the central concept of Albanian tribal structure. The fis is a community whose members are linked to each other as kin through the same patrilineal ancestry and live in the same territory. It has been translated in English as tribe or clan. Thus, fis refers both to the kinship ties that bind the community and the territorialization of that community in a region exclusively used in a communal manner by the members of the fis. In contrast, bashkësi (literally, association) refers to a community of the same ancestry that has not been established territorially in a given area that is its traditional home region.

It is further divided into fis i madh and fis i vogël. Fis i madh refers to all members of the kin community that live in its traditional territory, while fis i vogël refers to the immediate family members and their cousins (kushëri). In this sense, it is sometimes used synonymously with vëllazëri or vllazni in Gheg Albanian. This term refers to all families that trace their origin to the same patrilineal ancestor. Related families (familje) are referred to as of one bark/pl. barqe (literally, belly). As some tribes grew in number, a part of them settled in new territory and formed a new fis that may or may not have held the same name as the parental group. The concept of farefisni refers to the bonds between all communities that stem from the same fis. Farë literally means seed. Among southern Albanians, it is sometimes used as a synonym for fis, which in turn is used in the meaning of fis i vogël.

The term bajrak refers to an Ottoman military institution of the 17th century. In international bibliography of the late 19th and early 20th centuries it was often mistakenly equated with the fis as both would sometimes cover the same geographical area. The result of this mistake was the portrayal of bajrak administrative divisions and other regions as fis in early anthropological accounts of Albania, although there were bajraks in which only a small part or none at all constituted a fis.

== Geography ==
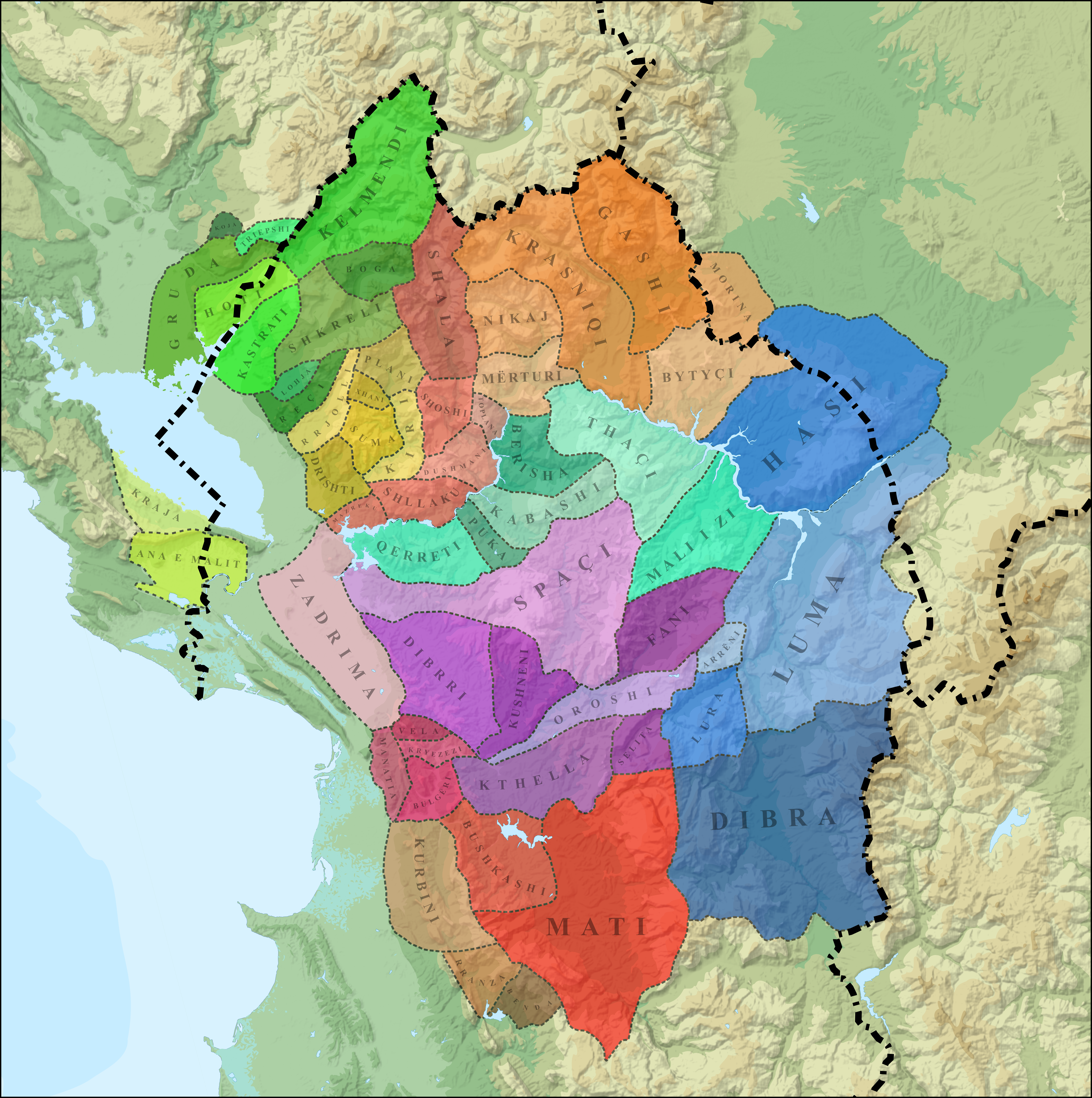
Map of the major Albanian tribal regions in northern Albania, Kosovo and Montenegro in the 20th century.

The Malësors (highlanders) lived in three geographical regions within northern Albania. Malësia e Madhe (great highlands) contained five large tribes, four of which (Hoti, Kelmendi, Shkreli, Kastrati) having a Catholic majority and Muslim minority and with Gruda evenly split between both religions. Within Malësia e Madhe there were seven small additional tribes. During times of war and mobilisation of troops, the bajraktar (chieftain) of Hoti was recognised by the Ottoman government as leader of all forces of the Malësia e Madhe tribes, having collectively some 6,200 rifles.

Malësia e Vogël (small highlands) contained seven Catholic tribes such as the Shala with four bajaraktars, Shoshi, Toplana, and Nikaj containing some 1,250 households with a collective strength of 2,500 men that could be mobilised for war. Shoshi had a distinction in the region of possessing a legendary rock associated with Lekë Dukagjini.

The Mirdita region was also a large powerful devoutly Catholic tribe with 2,500 households and five bajraktars that could mobilize 5,000 irregular troops. A general assembly of the Mirdita often met in Orosh to deliberate on important issues relating to the tribe. The position of hereditary prince of the tribe with the title Prenk Pasha (Prince Lord) was held by the Gjonmarkaj family. Apart from this princely family, the Franciscan Abbot held some influence among the Mirdita tribesmen.

The government estimated the military strength of Malësors in İşkodra sanjak as numbering over 30,000 tribesmen and Ottoman officials were of the view that the highlanders could defeat Montenegro on their own with limited state assistance.

In Western Kosovo, the Gjakovë highlands contained eight tribes that were mainly Muslim; in the Luma area near Prizren there were five tribes, mostly Muslim. Other important tribal groupings further south include the highlanders of the Dibra region known as the "Tigers of Dibra".

Among the many religiously mixed Catholic-Muslim tribes and one Muslim-Orthodox clan, Ottoman officials noted that tribal loyalties superseded religious affiliations. In Catholic households there were instances of Christians who possessed four wives, marrying the first spouse in a church and the other three in the presence of an imam, while among Muslim households the Islamic tradition of circumcision was ignored.

== Organisation ==
=== Northern Albanian ===
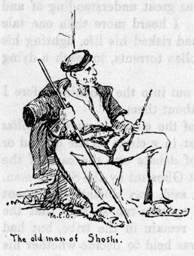
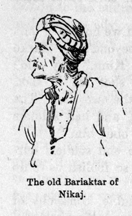
The old man of Shoshi (left), the old bajraktar of Nikaj (right), by Edith Durham, early 20th century.

Among Gheg Malësors of the highlands, the fis is headed by the oldest male (kryeplak) and forms the basic unit of tribal society. The governing councils consist of elders (pleqt, singular: plak). The idea of law administration is so closely related to "old age", that "to arbitrate" (me pleknue) and (plekní) means both "seniority" and "arbitration". The fis is divided into a group of several closely related houses (mehala) and a main house (shpi). The head of mehala is the krye (lit. "head", pl. krenë or krenët), while the head of the house is the zoti i shpis ("the lord of the house"). A house may be composed of two or three other houses with property in common under one zot.

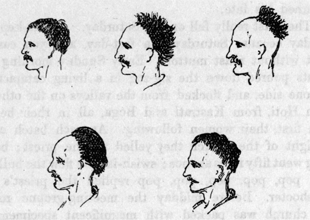
Traditional head-shaves in Kastrati and Shkreli by Edith Durham, early 20th century.

A political and territorial unit consisting of several clans was the bajrak (standard or banner). The leader of a bajrak, whose position was hereditary, was referred to as bajraktar (standard bearer). Several bajraks composed a tribe, which was led by a man from a notable family, while major issues were decided by the tribe assembly whose members of the tribe were male. The Ottomans implemented the bayraktar system within northern Albanian tribes, and granted some privileges to the bayraktars (banner chieftains) in exchange for their obligation to mobilize local fighters to support military actions of the Ottoman forces. Those privileges entitled Albanian tribesmen to pay no taxes and to be excluded from military conscription in return for commitment to military service as irregular troops; however few served in that capacity. Malisors viewed Ottoman officials as a threat to their tribal way of living and left it to their bajraktars to deal with the Ottoman political system. Officials of the Late Ottoman period noted that Malisors preferred that their children learn the use of a weapon and refused to send them to government schools that taught Turkish, which was viewed as a form of state control. Most Albanian Malisors were illiterate.

=== Southern Albanian ===
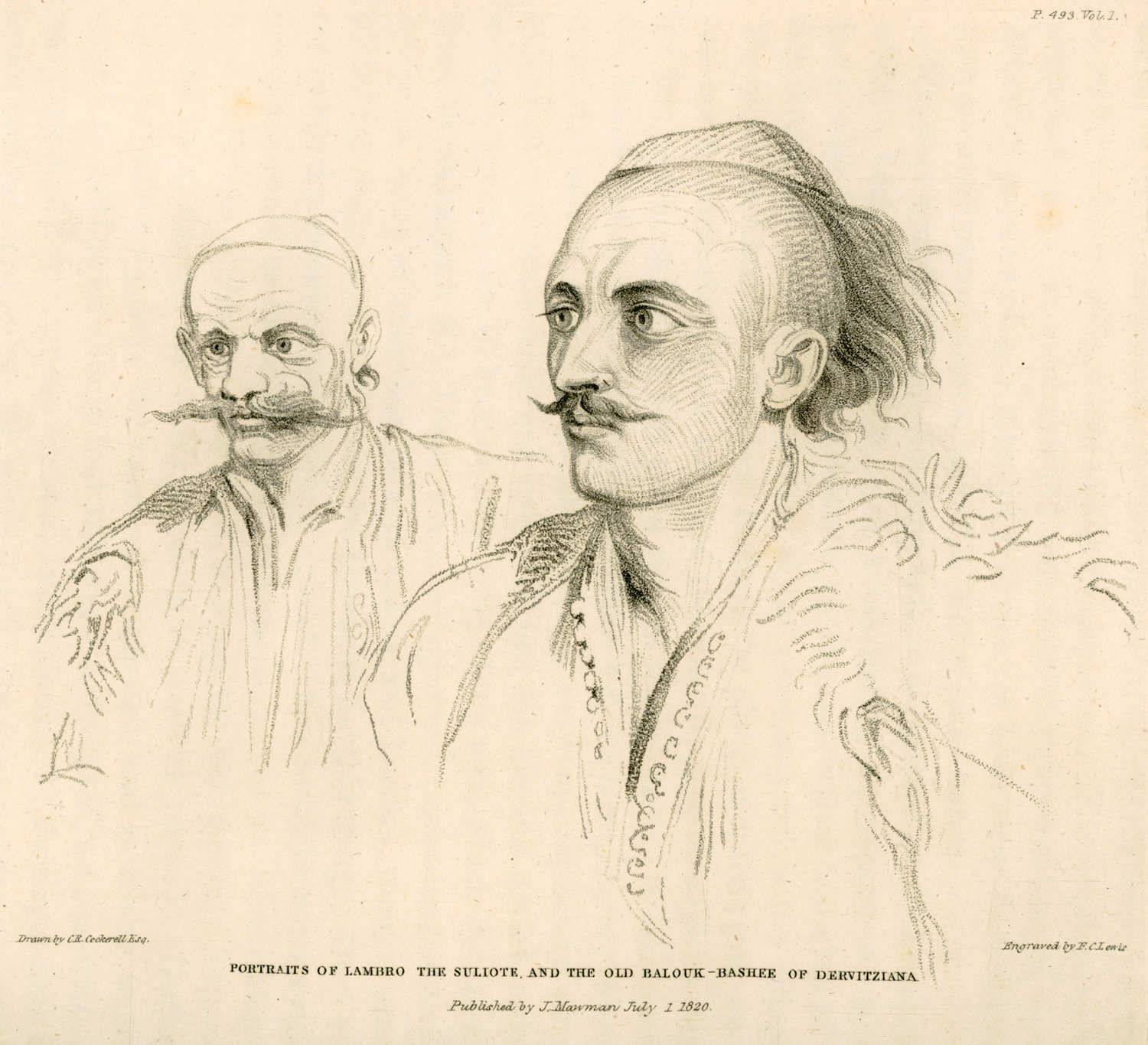
Portraits of Lambro the Suliote, and the old Balouk-Bashee of Dervitziana by Charles Robert Cockerell, published in 1820.

In southern Albania, the social system is based on the house (shpi or shtëpi) and the fis, which consists of a patrilineal kinship group and an exogamous unit composed of members with some property in common. The patrilineal kinship ties are defined by the concept of "blood" (gjak) including moral and physical characteristics that are shared by all the members of a fis. The fis generally consists of three or four generations sharing a common ancestor, while the tribe, fara or gjeri, is much smaller than a northern Albanian fis. The members of a fara have a common ancestor who is the eponymos founder of the village. The political organization is communal; every neighbourhood sends a representing elder (plak) to the governing council of the village (pleqësi), who elect the head of the village (kryeplak).

The Albanian term farë (definite form: fara) means "seed" and "progeny". In northern Albania it had no legal use, whereas in southern Albania, fara was used legally instead of the term fis of the northerners until the beginning of the 19th century, to mean a politically autonomous tribe and a 'brotherhood' (Gheg Alb. vëllazni; Tosk Alb. vëllazëri; or Alb. bark, "belly"). Attestations of these forms of social organization among southern Albanians are reported by Leake and Pouqueville when describing the traditional organization of Suli (between 1660 and 1803), Epirus, and of southern Albania in general (until the beginning of the 19th century). Pouqueville in particular reported that each village (Alb. katun) and each town was some kind of autonomous republic composed of farë brotherhoods. In other accounts he mentioned the 'great farë' tribes, each having their polemarchs. These chiefs had boluk-bashis (platoon commanders), analogus to the northern fis, the bajraktarë and the krenë (chieftains) of the vëllazni, respectively.

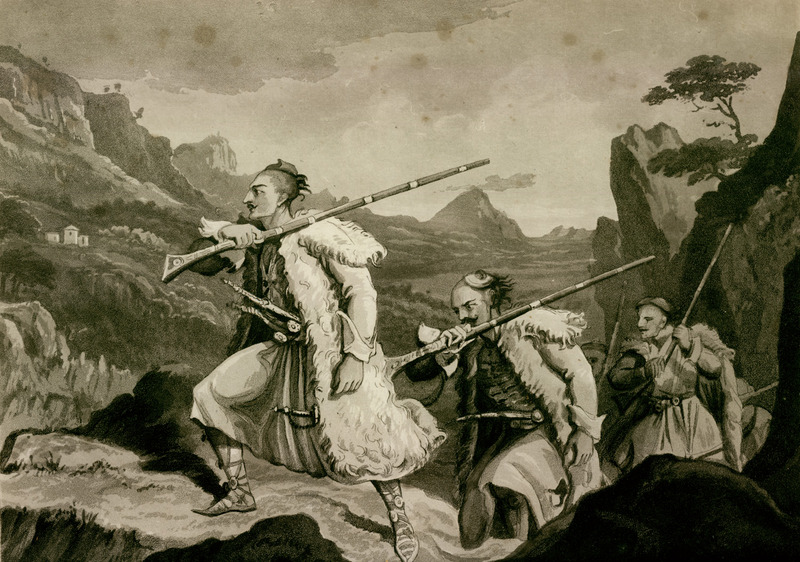
View of Albanian Palikars in Pursuit of an Enemy by Charles Robert Cockerell, published in 1820.

Unlike the northern Albanian tribes, the lineage groups of southern Albanians did not inhabit a closed region, but constituted ethnographic islands located on mountains surrounded by a farming environment. One of the centres of these lineage societies was based in Labëria in the central mountains of southern Albania. A second centre was based in Himara in southwest Albania. A third centre was based in the Suli region, located far south in the middle of a Greek population. The tendency to build segmentary lineage organizations of these mountain communities increased with the degree of their isolation, causing the loss of the tribal organization of the Albanian highlanders in southern Albania and northern Greece since the 15th century, during the period of the Ottoman dominion. Afterwards, these lineage segments increasingly became the basic political, economic, religious, and predatory units of social organization. Nevertheless, in the southern Albanian areas of tribal establishment, the Albanian customary law remained unaffected throughout the centuries of Ottoman rule.

According to Pouqueville these forms of social organizations disappeared with the dominion of the Ottoman Albanian ruler Ali Pasha, and definitely ended in 1813. In the Pashalik of Yanina, in addition to the Sharia for Muslims and Canon for Christians, Ali Pasha enforced his own laws, allowing only in rare cases the usage of local Albanian tribal customary laws. After annexing Suli and Himara into his semi-independent state in 1798, he tried to organize the judiciary in every city and province according to the principle of social equality, enforcing his laws for the entire population, Muslims and Christians. To limit blood feud killings, Ali Pasha replaced blood feuds (Alb. gjakmarrje) with other punishments such as blood payment or expulsion or the death penalty. Ali Pasha also reached an agreement with the Kurveleshi population not to trespass their territories, which at that time were larger than the area they inhabit today. Continually since the 18th century, blood feuds and their consequences in Labëria have been limited principally by the councils of elders (pleqësi).

The mountain region of Kurveleshi represents the last example of a tribal system among southern Albanians, which was regulated by the Code of Zuli (Kanuni i Papa Zhulit/Zulit or Kanuni i Idriz Sulit). In Kurvelesh the names of the villages were built as collective pluralia to designate the tribal settlements. For instance, Lazarat is a toponym that refers to the 'descendants of Lazar'.

== Culture ==
=== Autonomy, Kanun and Gjakmarrja ===
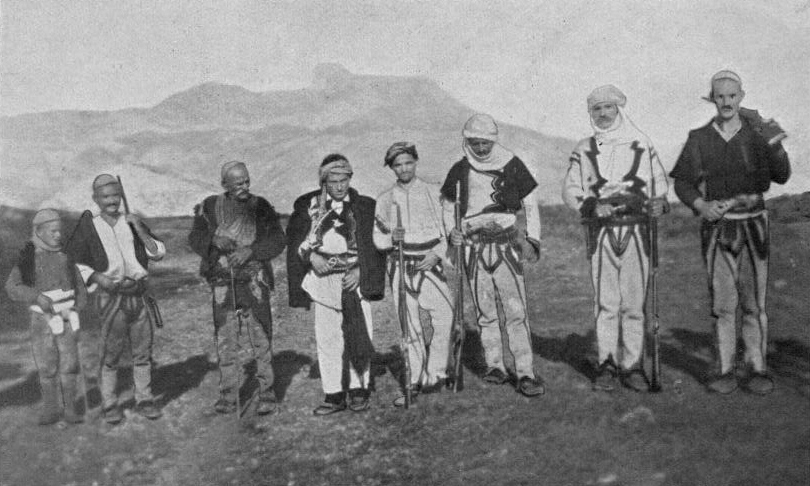
Shkreli tribesmen. Photo taken by William Le Queux before 1906.

The northern Albanian tribes are fiercely proud of the fact that they have never been completely conquered by external powers, in particular by the Ottoman Empire. This fact is considered as orthodox on a heritage and historical level by the tribes. In the 18th century the Ottomans instituted the system of bajrak military organization in northern Albania and Kosovo. From the Ottoman perspective, the institution of the bajrak had multiple benefits. Although it recognized a semi-autonomous status in communities like Hoti, it could also be used to stabilize the borderlands; in their new capacity, these communities would defend the borders of the empire as their own territory. Furthermore, in times of rebellion the Ottomans could use the office of head bajraktar to divide and conquer the tribes by handing out privileges to a select few. On the other hand, autonomy of the borderlands was a source of conflict as the tribes tried to increase their autonomy and minimize involvement of the Ottoman state. Through a series of conflicts and renegotiation a state of balance was found between Ottoman centralization and tribal autonomy. Hence, the Ottoman era is marked by both continual conflict and the formalization of socio-economic status within Ottoman administration.

Members of the tribes of northern Albania believe that their history is based on the notions of resistance and isolationism. Some scholars connect this belief with the concept of "negotiated peripherality"; throughout history the territory that northern Albanian tribes occupy has been contested and is peripheral. Northern Albanian tribes often exploited their position and negotiated their peripherality in profitable ways, which also affected their national program; its significance and challenges are different from those in southern Albania. Such peripheral territories are zones of the dynamic creation of culture, where it is possible to manipulate regional and national histories to the advantage of certain individuals and groups.

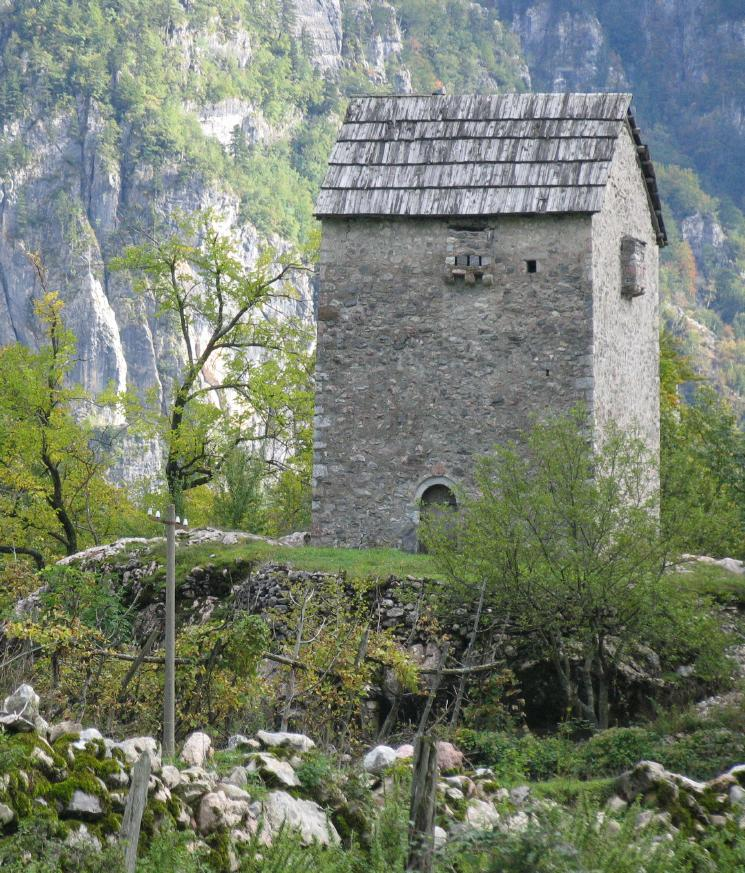
A fortified tower (kullë) in Theth used as a safe haven for men involved in blood feuds.

Malisor society used tribal law and participated in the custom of bloodfeuding. Ottoman control mainly existed in the few urban centres and valleys of northern Albania but was minimal or almost non-existent in the mountains, where Malisors lived an autonomous existence according to kanun (tribal law) of Lek Dukagjini. Western Kosovo was also an area where Ottoman rule among highlanders was minimal to non-existent and government officials would ally themselves with local power holders to exert any form of authority. Western Kosovo was dominated by the Albanian tribal system where Kosovar Malisors settled disputes among themselves through mountain law. In a period without stable state control, it was the tribe who tried its members. The usual punishments were fines, exile or disarmament. The house of the exiled member of the tribe would be burned. Disarmament was regarded as the most embarrassing verdict.

The Law of Lek Dukagjini (kanun) was named after a medieval prince Lekë Dukagjini from the fifteenth century who ruled in northern Albania and codified the customary laws of the highlands. Albanian tribes from the Dibra region governed themselves according to the Law of Skanderbeg (kanun), named after a fifteenth century warrior who fought the Ottomans. Disputes would be solved through tribal law within the framework of vendetta or blood feuding; the activity was widespread among the Malisors. In situations of murder, tribal law stipulated the principle of koka për kokë (a head for a head) where relatives of the victim are obliged to seek gjakmarrja (blood vengeance). Nineteen percent of male deaths in İşkodra vilayet and 600 fatalities per year in Western Kosovo were from murders caused by vendetta and blood feuding during the late Ottoman period.

=== Besa ===
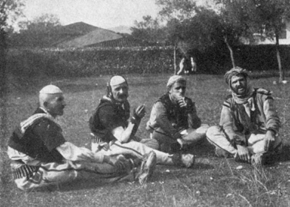
A Shala men, photo taken by Edith Durham before 1909.

Besa is a word in the Albanian language meaning "pledge of honor", "to keep the promise". Besa is an important institution within the tribal society of the Albanian Malisors, and is one of the moral principles of the Kanun. Albanian tribes swore oaths to jointly fight against the government and in this respect the besa served to uphold tribal autonomy. The besa was used to regulate tribal affairs both between and within tribes. The Ottoman government used the besa as a way to co-opt Albanian tribes into supporting state policies or to seal agreements.

During the Ottoman period, the besa would be cited in government reports of Albanian unrest, especially in the tribes. The besa formed a central place within Albanian society in order to generate military and political power. Besas held Albanians together, united them and would wane when the will to enforce them dissipated. In times of revolt against the Ottomans, the besa functioned as a link among different groups and tribes.

Besa is an important part of personal and familial standing and is often used as an example of "Albanianism". Someone who breaks his besa may even be banished from his community.

== Last period ==
=== Late Ottoman period ===
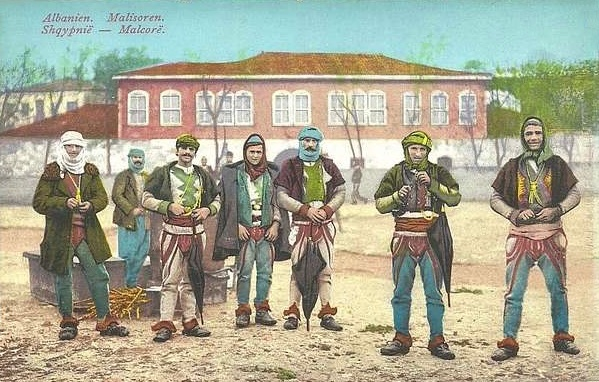
Albanian Malisors in an early 20th postcard.

During the Great Eastern Crisis, Prenk Bib Doda, hereditary chieftain of Mirdita initiated a rebellion in mid-April 1877 against government control and the Ottoman Empire sent troops to put it down. Montenegro attempted to gain support among the Malisors even though it lacked religious or ethnic links with the Albanian tribesmen. During the Eastern Crisis and subsequent border negotiations in April 1880, Italy suggested that the Ottoman Empire give Montenegro the Tuz district, containing mainly Catholic Gruda and Hoti populations, which would have split between them both countries. With Hoti this would have caused tensions and instability because of their traditionally having precedence over the other four tribes during peace and war. The tribes affected by the negotiations swore a besa (pledge) to resist any reduction of their lands and sent telegrams to surrounding regions asking for military assistance.

During the late Ottoman period Ghegs often lacked education and integration within the Ottoman system, even though they had autonomy and military capabilities. Those factors gave the area of Gegënia an importance within the empire that differed from Toskëria. Still many Ottoman officers thought that Ghegs, in particular the highlanders, were a liability instead of an asset. They were commonly referred to as a "wild" (Turkish: vahşi) and backward people living poverty and ignorance for 500 years, and hostile to civilisation and progress. In areas of Albania were Malisors lived, the empire only posted Ottoman officers who had prior experience in other tribal regions of the state like Kurdistan or Yemen that could bridge cultural divides with Gheg tribesmen.

Under Sultan Abdul Hamid II, Ottoman officials were posted to Albanian populated lands. Some Albanians strongly disproved of blood feuding, seeing it as inhumane and uncivilised, and an unnecessary waste of life that created social disruption, lawlessness and economic dislocation. To resolve this problem, Ottoman officials formed Blood Feud Reconciliation Commissions (musalaha-ı dem komisyonları) that produced results with limited success. In the late Ottoman period, due to the influence of Catholic Franciscan priests, some reduction of blood feuding among Albanian highlanders was achieved. For instance, guilt was restricted to the offender or their household and one tribe accepted the razing of the offender's home as compensation for the offense. Ottoman officials viewed the violence committed by Malisors in the 1880s-1890s as a tribal problem not related to nationalism or religion. They also noted that Albanian tribesmen who identified with Islam did so in name only and lacked knowledge of the religion.

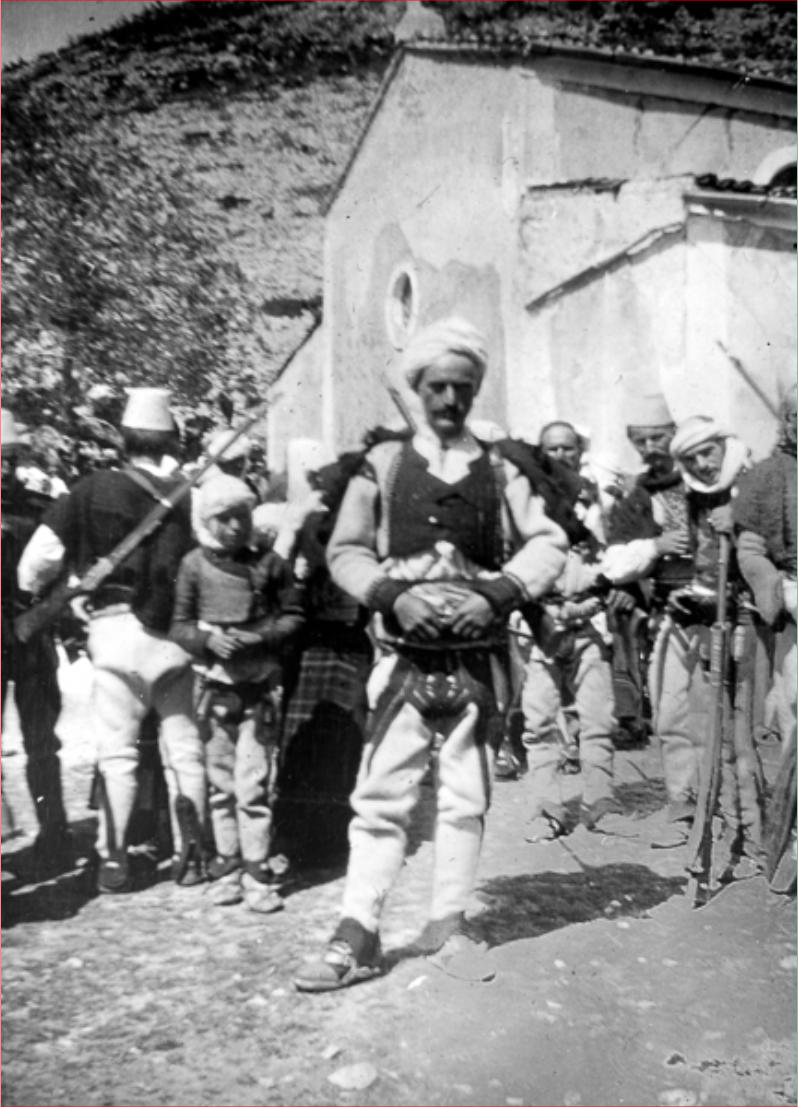
Men of the Shkreli tribe at the feast of Saint Nicholas at Bzheta in Shkreli territory, 1908.

In the aftermath of the Young Turk Revolution in 1908 the new Young Turk government established the Commissions for Reconciliation of Blood Feuds that focused on regions such as İpek (Pejë) and Prizren. The commissions sentenced Albanians who had participated in blood feud killing. The Council of Ministers allowed the Commission to continue their work in the provinces until May 1909. After the Young Turk Revolution and subsequent restoration of the Ottoman constitution, the Hoti, Shala, Shoshi, and Kastati tribes made a besa (pledge) to support it and stop blood feuding with other tribes until November 6, 1908. However, Albanian tribes that showed enthusiasm had little knowledge of what the constitution would do for them.

During the Albanian revolt of 1910, Malisors such as the Shala tribe fought against Ottoman troops that were sent to quell the uprising and disarm the population by collecting guns and replacing the Law of Lek with state courts and laws. Malisors planned further resistance and Albanian tribes living near the border fled into Montenegro while negotiating terms with the Ottomans for their return. The Ottoman military commander Mahmud Shevket concluded that the Bajraktars had become Albanian nationalists and posed a danger to the empire compared to previous uprisings.

The Albanian revolt of 1911 was begun during March by Catholic Albanian tribesmen after they returned from exile in Montenegro. The Ottoman government sent 8,000 troops to quell the uprising and ordered that tribal chieftains stand trial for leading the rebellion. During the revolt, Terenzio Tocci, an Italo-Albanian lawyer gathered the Mirditë chieftains on 26/27 April 1911 in Orosh and proclaimed the independence of Albania, raised the flag of Albania and declared a provisional government. After Ottoman troops entered the area to put down the rebellion, Tocci fled the empire abandoning his activities. On 23 June 1911 Albanian Malisors and other revolutionaries gathered in Montenegro and drafted the Greçë Memorandum demanding Albanian sociopolitical and linguistic rights with signatories from the Hoti, Gruda, Shkreli, Kelmendi and Kastrati tribes. In later negotiations with the Ottomans, an amnesty was granted to the tribesmen with promises by the government to: build roads and schools in tribal areas, pay wages of teachers, limit military service to the Istanbul and Shkodër areas, grant the right to carry weapons in the countryside but not in urban areas, appoint bajraktar relatives to certain administrative positions and compensate the Malisors returning from Montenegro with money and food. The final agreement was signed in Podgorica by both the Ottomans and Malisors during August 1912. The highlanders had managed to thwart the centralist tendencies of the Young Turk government.

=== People's Republic era ===
The last tribal system of Europe in northern Albania stayed intact until 1944 when Albanian communists seized power, ruling the country for half a century. During that time the tribal system was almost eradicated by the communists. After the collapse of communism in the early 1990s, northern Albania underwent demographic changes in tribal areas, sometimes becoming depopulated. Much of the population seeking a better life, moved either abroad or to Albanian cities such as Tiranë, Durrës or Shkodër; populations historically stemming from the tribes have become scattered. Locals that remained in northern Albanian areas have maintained an awareness of their tribal identity.

== List of historical tribes and tribal regions ==
The following is a list of historical Albanian tribes and tribal regions. Some of the tribes are considered extinct because no collective memory of descent has survived (i.e. Mataruga, Rogami etc.) while others became slavicised very early on and the majority of the descendants no longer consider themselves Albanian (i.e. Kuči, Mahine etc.).

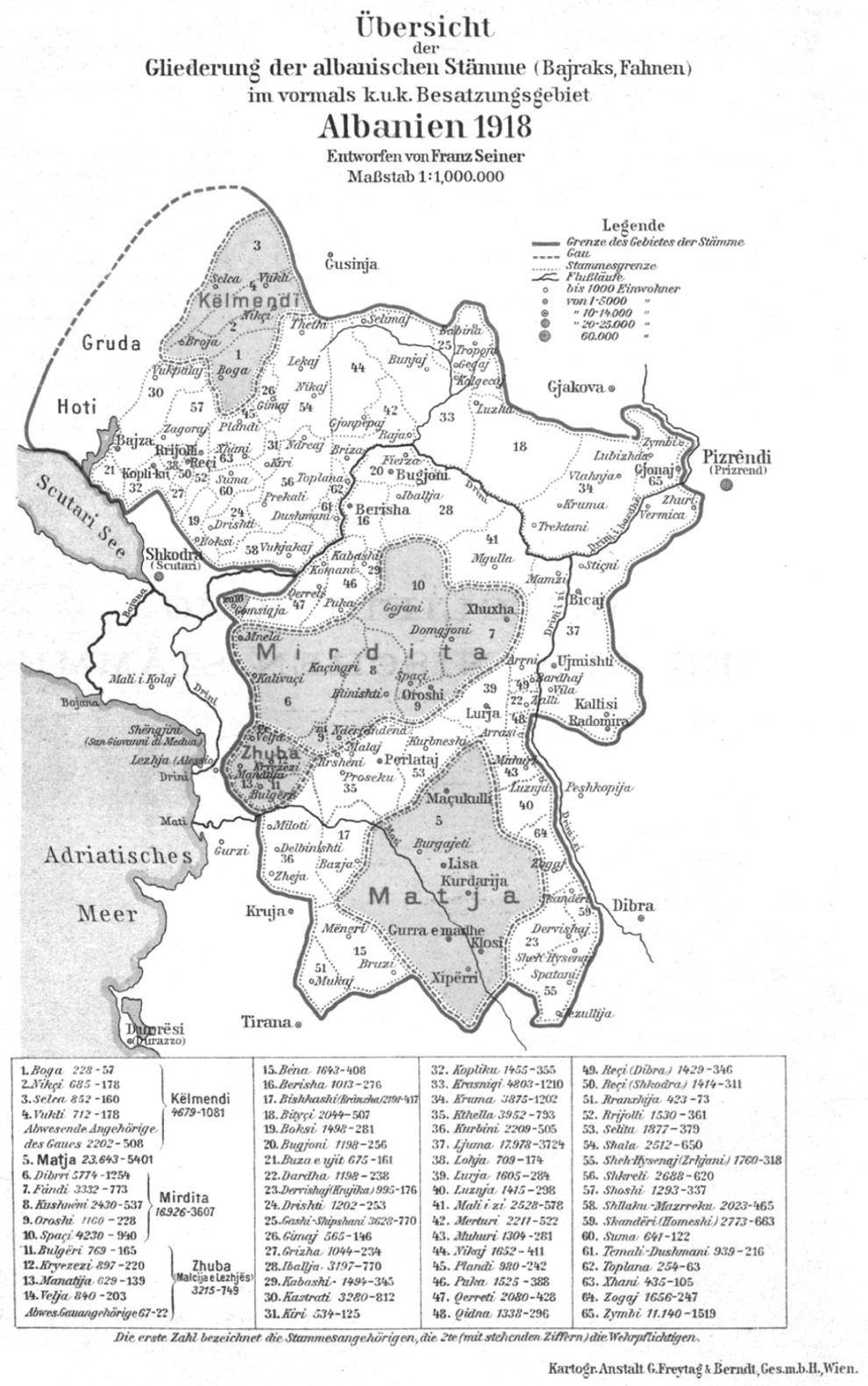
Map of bajraks and tribes by Franz Seiner, 1918.

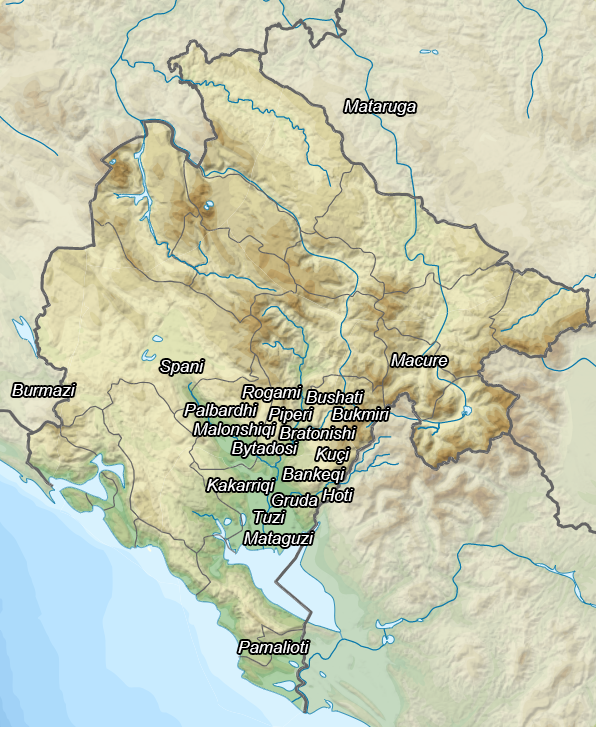
15th-16th century Albanian tribes in the territory of modern-day Montenegro

=== Malësia e Madhe ===
Malësia e Madhe, in the Northern Albanian Alps between Albania and Montenegro, historically has been the land of ten bigger and three smaller tribal regions. Two of them, Suma and Tuzi, came together to form Gruda in the 15th to 16th century. The people of this area are commonly called "highlanders" (Albanian: malësorë).

- Kelmendi
- Boga
- Gruda (entirely in Montenegro)
- Hoti (partially in Montenegro)
- Kastrati
- Shkreli
- Triesh (entirely in Montenegro)
- Koja (entirely in Montenegro)
- Lohja
- Tuzi
- Gruemiri
- Rrjolli
- Reçi
- Marsheni
- Lepuroshi

=== Pulat ===
The Pulat region:

- Plani
- Xhani
- Kiri
- Suma
- Drishti

=== Brda and Zeta ===
The Brda and Zeta regions:

- Bytadosi
- Bratonishi
- Bukumiri
- Kuçi
- Macure
- Malonšići
- Mataguzi
- Mugoša
- Piperi
- Palabardhi
- Rogami
- Vasaj

=== Albania Veneta ===
The Albania Veneta region:

- Pamalioti
- Mahine
- Kryethi
- Kakarriqi

=== Ragusan Hinterland and Herzegovina ===
The Ragusan Hinterland and Herzegovina regions:

- Burmazi
- Mataruga
- Shpani
- Kriçi
- Riđani

=== Dukagjin Highlands ===
The Dukagjin Highlands region includes the following tribes:

- Bobi
- Shala
- Shoshi
- Shllaku
- Mavriqi
- Mazreku
- Dushmani
- Toplana
- Prekali

=== Gjakova Highlands ===
There are six tribes of the Gjakova Highlands (Albanian: Malësia e Gjakovës) also known as Malësia e Vogël ("Lesser Malësia"):

- Nikaj (commonly grouped as Nikaj-Mërtur)
- Mërturi (commonly grouped as Nikaj-Mërtur)
- Krasniqi
- Gashi
- Bytyçi
- Morina

=== Puka ===
The "seven tribes of Puka" (Albanian: shtatë bajrakët e Pukës), inhabit the Puka region. Durham said of them: "Puka group ... sometimes reckoned a large tribe of seven bairaks. Sometimes as a group of tribes".

- Qerreti
- Puka
- Kabashi
- Berisha or Berisha-Merturi
- Thaçi
- Mali i Zi

=== Mirdita ===
The Mirdita region:

- Skana
- Dibrri
- Fani
- Kushneni
- Oroshi
- Spaçi
- Kthella
- Selita
- Dukagjini

=== Shkodra Lowlands, Lezha Highlands, and Zadrima ===
The Shkodra Lowlands, Lezha Highlands, and Zadrima regions:

- Bushati
- Bulgëri
- Kryezezi
- Manatia
- Vela
- Renesi

=== Kruja Highlands and Mat ===
The Kruja Highlands and Mat regions:

- Kurbini
- Ranza
- Benda
- Bushkashi
- Doçi
- Kadiu
- Jonima
- Progoni

=== Upper Drin Basin ===
The Upper Drin Basin region:

- Hasi
- Luma
- Lura
- Arrëni
- Dibra

=== Sharr Mountains ===
The Sharr Mountains region:

- Sopa

=== Myzeqe ===
The Myzeqe region:

- Lalë

=== Labëri and Epirus ===
The Labëri and Epirus regions:

- Beqaj
- Bua
- Boçari
- Dangëlli
- Dhrako
- Xhavella
- Kaskarelli
- Malakasioi
- Mazaraki
- Nika
- Meçohysaj
- Pantazi
- Zenevisi
- Spata
- Losha

=== Historical ===
- Suma (part of Gruda since the 15th-16th century)
- Nucullaj (now part of Koja)
- Gorvokaj (now part of Koja)
- Lazori (as of 1485 part of Kuçi)
- Kopliku
- Vorpsi (surname) Tirana

== See also ==
- Albanian culture
- List of ancient Illyrian peoples and tribes

== Sources ==
- Ahrens, Geert-Hinrich (2007). Diplomacy on the Edge: Containment of Ethnic Conflict and the Minorities Working Group of the Conferences on Yugoslavia. Woodrow Wilson Center Press. ISBN 978-0-8018-8557-0.
- Backer, Berit (2002). Behind Stone Walls: Changing household organisation among the Albanians of Kosovo (PDF). Dukagjini Balkan Books. ISBN 1508747946.
- Bardhoshi, Nebi (2011). Gurtë e kufinit (PDF). UET Press. ISBN 978-99956-39-22-8.
- De Rapper, Gilles (2012). "Blood and Seed, Trunk and Hearth: Kinship and Common Origin in southern Albania". In Hemming, Andreas; Kera, Gentiana; Pandelejmoni, Enriketa (eds.). Albania: Family, Society and Culture in the 20th century. LIT Verlag Münster. pp. 79–95. ISBN 9783643501448.
- Desnickaja, A. V. (1973). "Language Interferences and Historical Dialectology". Linguistics. 11 (113): 41–52. doi:10.1515/ling.1973.11.113.41. S2CID 144569294.
- Durham, Edith (1928a). High Albania. LO Beacon Press. ISBN 978-0-8070-7035-2.
- Durham, Edith (1928b). Some tribal origins, laws and customs of the Balkans.
- Elsie, Robert (2003). Historical Dictionary of Albania. Scarecrow Press. ISBN 978-0-8108-7380-3.
- Elsie, Robert (2015). The Tribes of Albania: History, Society and Culture. I.B.Tauris. ISBN 9780857739322.
- Enke, Ferdinand (1955). Zeitschrift für vergleichende Rechtswissenschaft: einschliesslich der ethnologischen Rechtsforschung (in German). Vol. 58. Germany: Akademie für Deutsches Recht.
- Galaty, Michael L. (2002). "Modeling the Formation and Evolution of an Illyrian Tribal System: Ethnographic and Archaeological Analogs". In William A. Parkinson (ed.). The Archaeology of Tribal Societies. Berghahn Books. ISBN 1789201713.
- Galaty, Michael L. (2011). "Blood of Our Ancestors". In Helaine Silverman (ed.). Contested Cultural Heritage: Religion, Nationalism, Erasure, and Exclusion in a Global World. Springer. ISBN 978-1-4419-7305-4.
- Galaty, Michael L. (2018). Memory and Nation Building: From Ancient Times to the Islamic State. Rowman & Littlefield. ISBN 9780759122628.
- Gawrych, George (2006). The Crescent and the Eagle: Ottoman rule, Islam and the Albanians, 1874–1913. London: IB Tauris. ISBN 9781845112875.
- Jelavich, Barbara (1983). History of the Balkans. Cambridge University Press. ISBN 978-0-521-27458-6.
- Kaser, Karl (2012). "Pastoral Economy and Family in the Dinaric and Pindus Mountains". In Karl Kaser (ed.). Household and Family in the Balkans: Two Decades of Historical Family Research at University of Graz. LIT Verlag Münster. ISBN 9783643504067.
- Kola, Azeta (January 2017). "From serenissima's centralization to the selfregulating kanun: The strengthening of blood ties and the rise of great tribes in northern Albania from 15th to 17th century". Acta Histriae. 25 (2): 349–374 [369]. doi:10.19233/AH.2017.18.
- Mertus, Julie (1999). Kosovo: How Myths and Truths Started a War. University of California Press. ISBN 978-0-520-21865-9.
- Mangalakova, Tanya (2004). "The Kanun in Present-Day Albania, Kosovo, and Montenegro". International Centre for Minority Studies and Intercultural Relations. Sofia.
- Martucci, Donato (2017). "Le consuetudini giuridiche albanesi tra oralità e scrittura". Palaver (in Italian). 6 (2): 73–106. doi:10.1285/i22804250v6i2p73. ISSN 2280-4250.
- Valentini, Giuseppe (1956). Il diritto delle comunità nella tradizione giuridica albanese; generalità. Vallecchi.
- Villar, Francisco (1996). Los indoeuropeos y los orígenes de Europa (in Spanish). Madrid: Gredos. ISBN 84-249-1787-1.
