= Xhuxhë =

- Village
- Location within Albania
- Coordinates: 41°57′44″N 20°12′39″E
- Country: Albania
- County: Lezhë
- Municipality: Mirditë
- Administrative unit: Fan
- Time zone: UTC+1 (CET)
  - Summer (DST): UTC+2 (CEST)

Xhuxhë is a populated place in Lezhë County, Albania. At the 2015 local government reform it became part of the municipality Mirditë.

== See also ==
- Fan, Albania
