= Arrëni =

Were a small Albanian tribe or fis from the Lumë region

Arrëni (also spelled Arni, Arrni, Arnji and Arrnji) were a small Albanian tribe or fis from the Lumë region.

== Geography ==
The Arrëni inhabited the southwestern part of the Lumë valley and a village in the region is named after their tribe. Their tribal region is centred in the area between Mount Zeba and the western bank of the Black Drin. They border Dardha to the south, Luma to the east and northeast and the Mirdita region to the west and northwest, in particular the Oroshi and Fani tribes.

== Origin ==
The Arrëni were of polyphyletic origin thus they are not a traditional Albanian fis in the sense that they do not claim descendant from a common male ancestor. The tribe itself is an offshoot of the larger Berisha tribe.

== History ==
The term Arrëni was first recorded in 1641 in a report of Marco Scura and in 1703 as Arena and Areni in a report of the Catholic archbishop of Bar, Vincentius Zmajevich.

The Arrëni were a small tribe located between three larger groupings, Luma, Dibra and Mirdita. Although they had close relations with all three, they were quite independent. Like other tribes such as Dibra, Mat and Lura, the Arrëni were an ethnographic grouping with a distinct history and identity. They are said to have been separated from the Berisha tribe and are culturally related to the tribes of the Mirdita region. Their Women traditionally wore the Mirdita dress.

The Arrëni tribe was originally Catholic and a church dedicated to Saint Barbara was located in their chief village. The whole tribe converted to Islam during the Ottoman rule.
