= Kiri (tribe) =

Region in Albania; historic Albanian tribe

Kiri is a historical Albanian tribe (fis) and ethnographic region located on the eastern side of the upper Kir river in the wider region of Pulti, northern Albania.

== Etymology ==
The Kiri derive their name from the River Kir which flows through the region of Pulti in northern Albania. The river itself is recorded for the first time in Livy's Ab urbe condita (written between 27 and 9 BCE) in the form Clausula. It is later recorded in the 5th century Tabula Peutingeriana as Cleusis. The name appears in later sources from the Middle Ages and into the modern era in the forms of Clyre, Chiri, and Kiri.

== Geography ==
The lands of the Kiri are largely located on the eastern banks of the upper Kir and include a number of settlements and mëhallë (quarters): Kir, Nonaj, Kasnec, Lekgjonaj, Telash, Aliaj, Palucaj, Shkuq, Gjeshgoraj, Marknonaj, Palnonaj, Petal, and Prangull.

== Origins ==
Despite forming a single military-administrative unit (bajrak) in the Ottoman period, the Kiri are not a tribe of the same patrilineal ancestry. According to oral traditions, the current brotherhoods of Kiri arrived during the 16th and 18th centuries. A number of the brotherhoods trace their origins back to the four brothers Ndue, Tel, Byk, and Ali Bezhani. Tradition maintains that they had arrived from Peja in western Kosovo and initially only constituted a single household in Telash. According to Giuseppe Valentini the brotherhoods originating from Peja are called the Petali. On the other hand, another portion of the Kiri claim to have arrived from the Ndrekalorë of Kuči in eastern Montenegro during the 16th century and had first settled in an area now called Stinjok. They are the Nonaj. According to Franz Nopsca, the Kiri descending from Kuči could trace their ancestry back to 12 generations in 1907 (from father to son): Nrekal Kuçi > Petal Nrekali > Vuz Petali > Gjin Vuzi > Pep Gjini > Nre Pepa > Palush Nreu > Nik Palushi > Pal Nika > Lul Pali > Pal Lula > Mihil Pali. Other unrelated brotherhoods include the Kodra and Selimi.

== History ==
In the Ottoman defter of 1485 for the Sanjak of Scutari the settlement of Klir is recorded in the nahiyah of Petrishpan-ili with a total of 20 households that produced 1100 ducats per annum. The anthroponyms recorded in the register are overwhelmingly Albanian and indicate that the village was not inhabited by a single related fis. Branches of the Bukumiri (Milashi son of Bukmiri, Gjoni son of Bukmiri, Andrija son of Bukmiri) and Prekali (Dimeniko son of Prekali, Gjorgji son of Prekali) tribes were settled in Kiri, while possible members of the Kuči are also attested with Andrija and Pali, sons of Kuça.

Kiri (Chiri) appears in a report of 1671 written by Stefano Gaspari as a settlement with 43 homes and 300 inhabitants. The village had a church dedicated to St. Veneranda. It appears as by 1671 the Kiri had started expanding as the village of Kasnec (Casnessi) is also recorded with 9 homes and 50 inhabitants. The locals of Kasnec had no church and attended mass at the church of St. Veneranda in Kiri.

In 1881 Kiri had 75 houses and 550 inhabitants and as of 1892 the bajraktar was based in Kasnec.
