= Lurë =

- Administrative unit
- Location within Albania
- Coordinates: 41°49′N 20°13′E
- Country: Albania
- County: Dibër
- Municipality: Dibër

Government
  - Administrator: Xhovalin Rajta (Qaushi)

Population (2011)
  - Administrative unit: 1,096
- Time zone: UTC+1 (CET)
  - Summer (DST): UTC+2 (CEST)

Lurë is a former municipality in the Dibër County, northeastern Albania. At the 2015 local government reform it became a subdivision of the municipality Dibër. Its administrator is Leonard Rajta. The population at the 2011 census was 1,096. The region of Lurë is inhabited by the Albanian Lura tribe.

Old Lurë (Albanian: Lurë e vjetër), Lurë Plain (Albanian: Fushe Lurë) and Borie Lurë, are the three neighborhoods of Lurë. Additional villages within the municipality include Krej Lurë, Pregj Lurë, Arrmall, Vlashë, and Gur Lurë.

Covering an area of 1,280 hectares, Lurë National Park lies on the eastern side of the Kunora e Lurës mountain massif. The park contains 14 glacial lakes situated at elevations between 1,350 and 1,720 meters. Notable lakes include Liqeni i Madh, the Lake of Pines (13 hectares), Black Lake (8 hectares), and Lake of Flowers (4 hectares).

== Demographic history ==
Lurë appears in the Ottoman defter of 1467 as a village in the timar of Ali Vardari in the vilayet of Lower Dibra. The settlement had a total of nine households represented by the following household heads: Pop Sima; Mirko, brother of Pop Sima; Gjergj Limaçi; Martini, son of Gjergji; Shtjefan Matarisi; Gjon Gjerboçi; Peter Smaqi (Zmaqi); and Tolë Miçoqi.

== Notable people ==
- Nikollë Kaçorri
