= Pashtrik =

Mountain on the border of Albania and Kosovo

- Mali i Pashtrikut
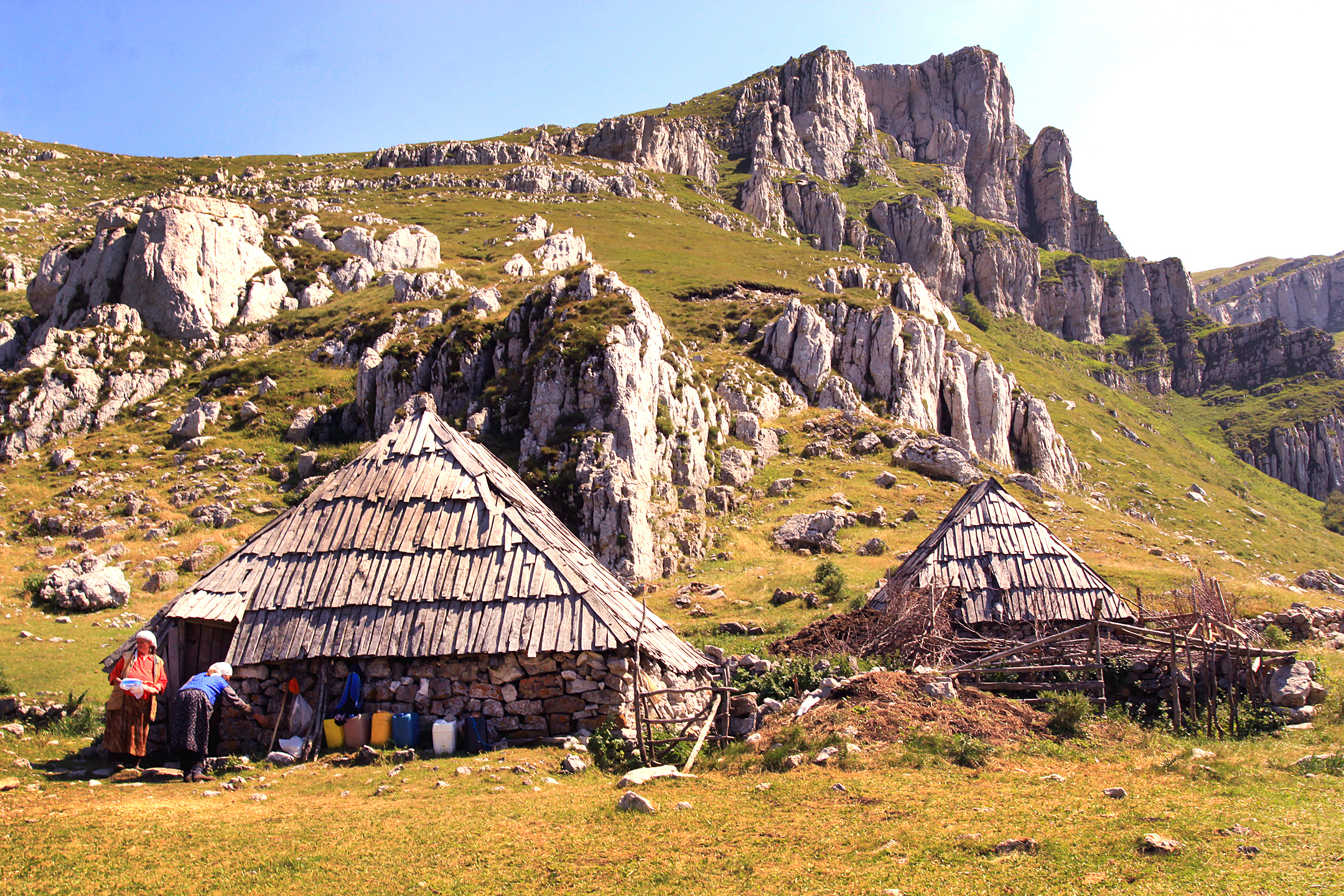
- View of the rugged slopes of Pashtrik

Highest point
- Elevation: 1,989 m (6,526 ft)
- Prominence: 1,423 m (4,669 ft)
- Isolation: 12.3 km (7.6 mi)
- Listing: Ribu
- Coordinates: 42°12′37″N 20°31′26″E

Geography
- Location within Albania Location within Kosovo
- Countries: Albania; Kosovo
- Region: Central Mountain Region
- Municipality: Kukës, Prizren
- Parent range: Has Highlands

Geology
- Rock age: Mesozoic
- Mountain type: mountain
- Rock type: limestone

Pashtrik (def. 'Pashtriku') is a mountain located in the Has region of northeastern Albania, with a smaller portion extending into southwestern Kosovo. Rising to 1,989 m (6,526 ft) above sea level, it forms part of the outer margin of the Has Highlands, which serve as a natural boundary between the two countries.

According to legend, the mountain is regarded as the burial place of Sarı Saltık, a revered Dervish holy figure. Each year on August 22nd, thousands of followers make the pilgrimage up to the summit in his honor.

== Geology ==
Pashtrik occupies the northeastern edge of the Has plateau, between the Krumë basin to the northwest and the valley of the White Drin to the southeast. To the east it overlooks the Plain of Dukagjin.

The summit has a distinct conical profile and stands prominently above the surrounding limestone uplands. To the northwest, it is separated from Mali i Kunorës (1,512 m) by Qafa e Mullarëve.

Composed entirely of Mesozoic limestone formations, its carbonate structure has produced a rugged and predominantly karstic landscape, with limited surface water as a result of underground drainage.

The Pashtrik–Kunora ridge displays a monoclinal structure, with a steep southwestern escarpment and a more gradual descent toward the northwest. The marked difference in elevation between the mountain crest (1,989 m) and the plateau below reflects significant tectonic uplift.

== Biodiversity ==
The southern and northern slopes, along with much of the northwestern flank, are largely barren and rocky. By contrast, sections of the western and eastern slopes support natural vegetation, primarily oak forests. Several flower and grass species are found here such as the field chickweed (Cerastium arvense), burnet (Sanguisorba) and the golden oat grass (Trisetum flavescens).

== Climbing route ==
The shortest route to the summit passes through Cahan. Starting from the village of Gorozhup, the round-trip hike covers approximately 12 km, with an elevation gain of 1,200 m and requires about six hours to complete.

== See also ==
- List of mountains in Albania
- List of mountains in Kosovo
