= Prekali =

Albanian tribe

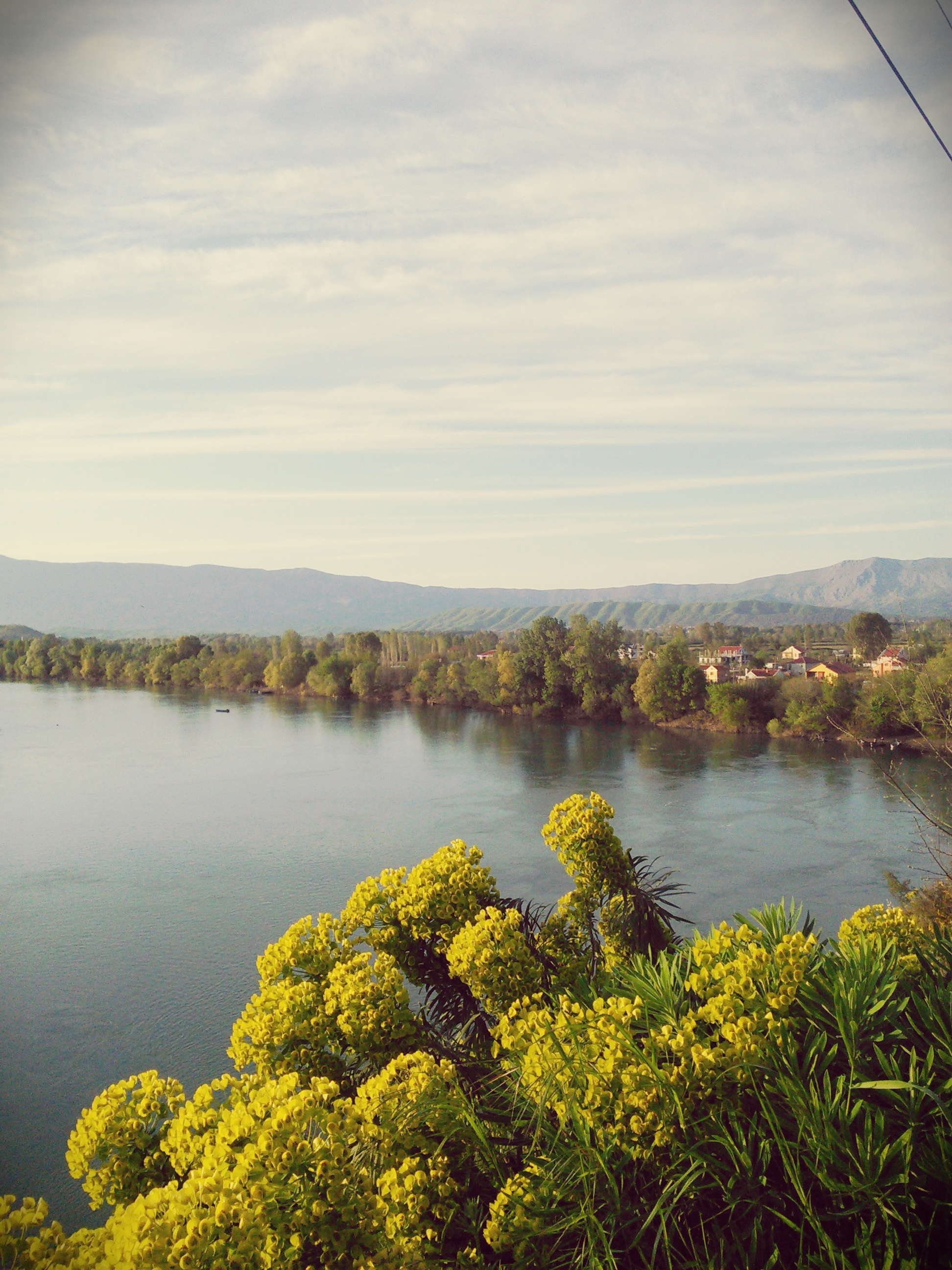
The village of Prekali appears in 1416 on the banks of the Buna river near the village of Pentar

Prekali was an Albanian tribe of the Middle Ages. Their origin was probably in the Dukagjin highlands of northern Albania. Since the 16th century, the Prekali tribe gradually became part of other communities in that region.

== History ==
Prekali was a community based on kinship ties that can be traced back to one progenitor. In that sense, it was a bashkësi (union of brotherhoods), but not a fis, as for a tribe to be a fis it has to have exclusive communal property rights in a given territory, which is part of their hereditary community. Their name comes from the Albanian personal name Preka. In the cadaster of Venetian Shkodra, there were two villages named Prekal on the modern Albania-Montenegro border and most of their inhabitants held the patronymic Prekali, an indication that the villages were communal settlements of this tribe. The village of Gaduçi was also mostly inhabited by this tribe. Prekali nën shkallë, headed by pronoiar Jonema Prekali was near the Buna river between the villages of Pentari and Luarzë. Prekali in the mountains (Prekali në mal) headed by Andrea Prekali was on the right bank of the river. Gaduçi headed by Gjin Prekali was near Velipoja in the settlement of Malkolaj.

In the defter of the Sanjak of Scutari in 1485 Prekali appears spread throughout the lands north-east of Shkodër and Drisht. The village of Gur i Zi in which the tribe held property in 1416, appears as also having the name Prekal in 1485, an indication of their settlement there. A century later, in the defter of 1582, their village near the plains of the Buna river appears under two names Shul Prekala or Gjergj Bardhi.

A branch of Prekali was on the process of becoming a feudal family in the early 15th century. For example, in the 1416-17 cadaster one of them Petro Prekali appears as ducal citizen of Balec. Others in the cadaster appear as pronoiars recognized by Venice in villages of the area. Many others lived in villages throughout the region south of Shkodra. The Ottoman conquest of the country stopped this feudalization process and as many in northern Albania, their community underwent a retribalization of social relations. In this period, the village Prekal appears which still exists today on the banks of the river Kir in the municipal unit of Postribë. Of the five brotherhoods of this village, the Lekçaj (also known as Ulqaj) are descendants of the Prekali founders. The other four descend from Shoshi, which is about 20km north of Prekal.
