= Fan (river) =

River in Albania

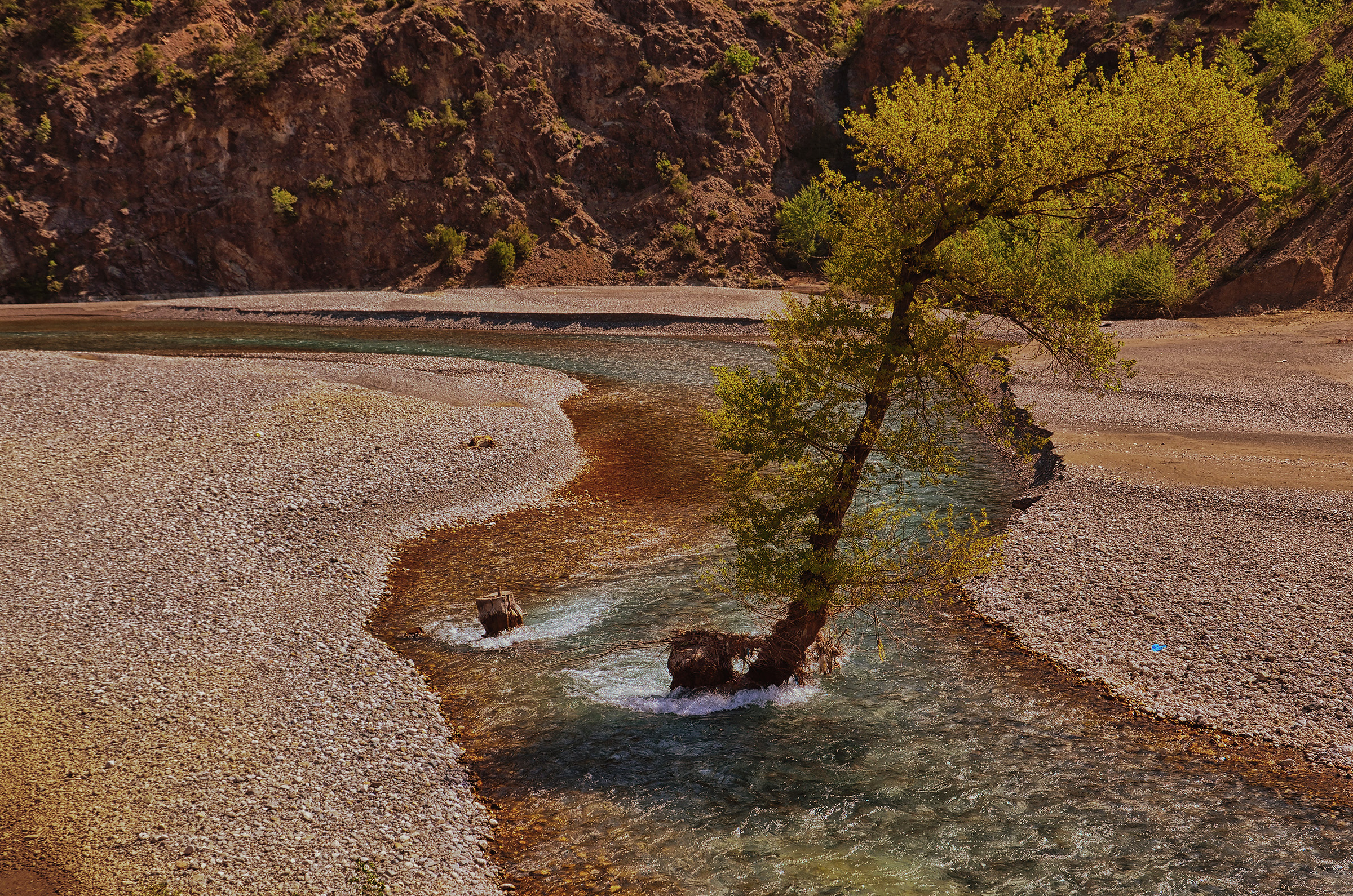
- Fan rivers stream near Reps

Location
- Country: Albania

Physical characteristics
- Source
  - location: Northern Albania
- Mouth
  - location: Mat
  - coordinates: 41°42′21″N 19°46′13″E

Basin features
- Progression: Mat→ Adriatic Sea

The Fan is a river in northern Albania. It is formed by the confluence of two source rivers: the Great Fan (Albanian: Fan i Madh) and the Lesser Fan (Albanian: Fan i Vogël), that join a few kilometers west of the town Rrëshen.

The Great Fan rises near the village Kryezi, Qafë-Mali municipal unit, in the Shkodër County. It flows generally southwest through Fushë-Arrëz and Gjegjan. The Lesser Fan rises near the village Thirrë, in the municipal unit Fan, Mirditë municipality, Lezhë County. It flows southwest through Reps (Orosh) and just north of Rrëshen. West of Rrëshen the two source rivers unite and the Fan continues west to Rubik, and then south until it flows into the river Mat, east of Milot. The Mat in turn flows into the Adriatic Sea, near Fushë-Kuqe

== Gallery ==
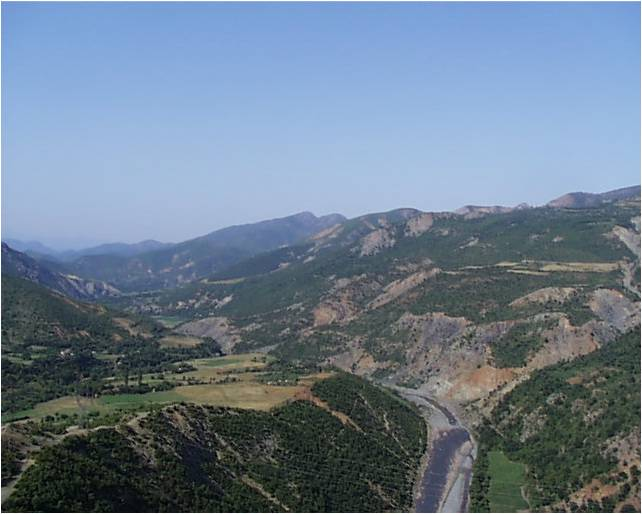
Valley of Fan i Vogël in Orosh

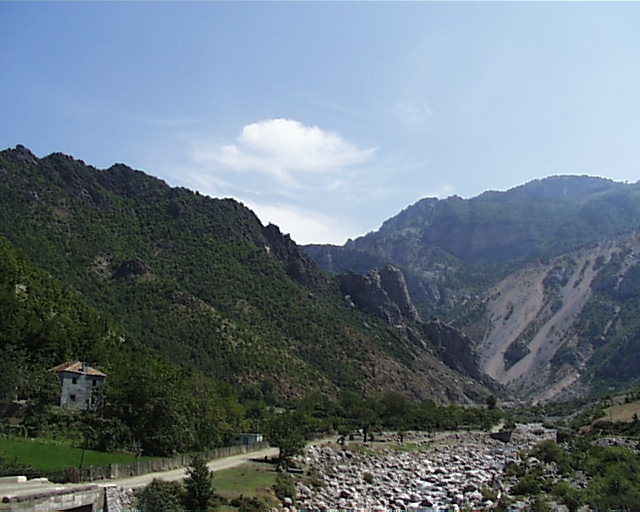
Fan i Vogël at Klos, Mat

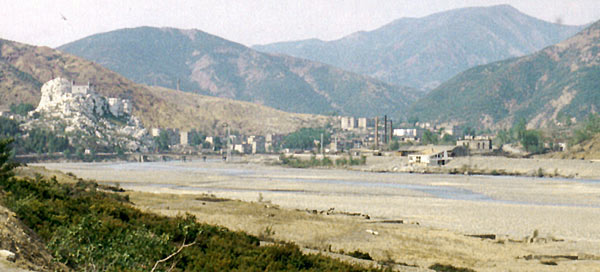
The Valley of the Fan at Rubik
