= Has (region) =

Region of northeastern Albania and southwestern Kosovo

Has (Albanian definite form: Hasi) is a region in north eastern Albania and south western Kosovo.

Hasi is an ethno-geographic area with well-defined borders, bounded by the Drin river to its west and southwest and by the White Drin river on its south, east and northeast. It is located in northeastern Albania and southwestern Kosovo. This division occurred in 1913 as a result of the First Balkan War.

Hasi has an area of 371 square kilometers and a population of around 40,000 in the Republic of Kosovo, while in the Republic of Albania it has an area of 374 square kilometers and a population of 21,500. Hasi thus has a total area of 745 square kilometers and a population of 61,500.

== Etymology ==
The name originates from hass, an Ottoman land revenue. The area was first mentioned as a hass in a 1570 document. During the 16th century the region was mentioned as Shullan, which Selami Pulaha considers an Albanian name.

== Geography ==
Has region

Has is an ethnographic province with well defined boundaries, surrounded all around with lakes. Its region in the parts of Albania is based on Kukës, and through the Kosovo side, it is divided in the Municipality of Gjakova, and one part in the Municipality of Prizren. Some of the main rivers in Has are Kruma, Vlahna, Rosman, Leshnica, Vogova, Racica, Trava and Deshtica while the main lakes are Kruma, Zym, Shigjeq and Fierza.

The Kruma Basin lies in the central part of Has and is of tectonic origin. In general, it has the shape of a large natural amphitheater, surrounded by semi-mountainous and hilly relief that opens widely from the southwest into the Drina River valley. It has an area of 227 km^{2} and an average altitude of 400–500m above sea level.

=== Settlements ===
In Albania, Has consists of the following villages:

- Bardhaj (Maç)
- Brenogë
- Cahan
- Dobrunë
- Domaj
- Fajzë
- Gajrep
- Golaj
- Gjinaj
- Helshan
- Kishaj
- Kosturr
- Krumë
- Letaj
- Liken i Kuq
- Metaliaj
- Mulaj
- Nikoliq
- Peraj
- Perollaj
- Pogaj
- Pus i Thatë
- Qarr
- Tregtan
- Vlahën
- Vranisht
- Zahrisht
- Zgjeç and smaller hamlets of Brrut, Shalqin, Sefoll and Tobël.

In Kosovo, Has consists of the following villages:

- Gorozhup
- Milaj
- Pllanejë,
- Kojushë,
- Mazrek,
- Gjonaj,
- Tupec,
- Karashëngjergj,
- Zym,
- Lukinaj,
- Krajk,
- Romajë,
- Dedaj,
- Lubizhdë e Hasit,
- Kabash i Hasit,
- Kushnin,
- Rogovë,
- Damjan,
- Gërçinë,
- Lipovec,
- Ujz,
- Fshaj,
- Bishtazhin,
- Smaq,
- Goden,
- Dol,
- Raçë,
- Moglicë,
- Zhub,
- Pjetërshan,
- Guskë,
- Vogovë,
- Brekoc,
- Zylfaj,
- Kushavec,
- Kusar,
- Firzë
- Devë.

=== Terrain ===
Based on the geographical relief, Hasi is divided into three parts: Brija, Guri and Rrafshi, which together are usually known as Hasi i Thatë. It is distinguished by the diversity of relief forms such as the Kruma hollow, the Planit plain, the Vlahnës coast up to the highest passes and peaks. It has a forest area of 23,200 ha, bare area of 760 ha, arable and urban area of 8,500 ha, pastures and meadows of 4,430 ha and non-productive area of 8,361 ha. The average altitude of the Has highlands is 662m above sea level and increases from west to east and from southeast to northeast. The mountains of the northwestern unit, starting from Pashtriku in the center, are divided into two mountain ranges (Pashtrik-Krajlica and Pashtrik-Tregtan).

=== Climate ===
The highlands of Has have three primary climates: a continental climate with elements of Mediterranean climate in the valley of the Drina, and a mountain climate which reigns in the hilly areas of Has. The parts that are affected by the Mediterranean climate are characterized with hot and dry summers and little precipitation. The average annual temperature reaches 11.4C. The month of January is the coldest month in this region with the average temperature being 0.4C - 0.9C, and higher temperatures during July and August of 22 C. The average amount of precipitation in Has ranges from 700 to 800 mm.

=== Natural resources ===
Hasi is considered to be rich in natural resources. These can be primarily found in the region of Vlanes with about 3,000,000 tons of chrome reserves containing 30-32% of Cr_{2}O_{3} and special troops with over 40%. In this district, there are other deposits in the villages of Gajrep, Gzhime, Perollaj and Mac, with around 300,000 tonnes of chrome reserves.

Aside from chrome, there are also other known copper viin deposits of quartz - sulfide in the massive Gabror in the areas of Nikolic 1 and 2 with about 2,000,000 tons of reserves. Golaj is considered to have around 1,000,000 tons. The mines of Golaj and Kurma are closed and are not being used. The distinguished copper reserves in the Has district are: Nikoliq-Golaj area, Krumë, Zahrisht, in the Has district. Albania is a major source of chromium and its areas with deposits are Vlahna and Perollaj. Areas rich in ferronickel and nickel silicate are those of Muç - Has areas with the fields of Gjinaj and Domaj along the lake shore of Fierza. Copper deposits of the Kruma Golaj, though with reservations, are unable to be used in business transactions due to the poor quality of the district minerals. They have underground counts for 14 million tons of chrome reserves.

== History ==
Following the Battle of Kosovo in 1389, the territory of Has was occupied by the Ottomans. It set the military feudal system and the residents had to pay multiple taxes. The population was violently converted into Islam and a part of residents withdrew to mountainous areas. Many medieval chroniclers, historians and scholars have determined Hasi as the Kastrioti family's place of origin.

Ottoman records indicate that during the 16th century, the Hasi region, which was part of the Nahiya of Hasi, was inhabited almost entirely by Albanians. The anthroponomy of the region's inhabitants were mainly Albanian. Out of 2507 Christian households (according to Ottoman registers from 1571 and 1591 covering the nahije of Rudina, nahije of Domshtica and nahije of Pashtrik), 1768 households bore Albanian names, 643 households bore mixed Albanian-Slavic names, and 96 bore purely Slavic names, while out of 492 Muslim households, 205 bore Albanian surnames and 37 Slavic surnames.

In the areas of Has during the sixteenth century highland tribes such as Berisha, Bytyç, Gash, Krasniq, Kastrati, Morine, Shal, Thac, settled; a population which grew and consolidated Hasi's territory.

In 1634, the Albanian bishop Pjetër Mazreku wrote that "The Has region is inhabited by Albanians". Mazreku reported that there had been previously 50 Catholic parishes in the region but were now only five. The region also played a role in supplying soldiers for the Austrians against the Ottomans during the Austrian-Ottoman wars in the years of 1689–90.

The full province of Has was divided after the Balkan wars in the early twentieth century. This partition was sanctioned at the Ambassadors Conference in London in 1913. The borderline was set in the eastern part of Albania. Today, the area of Hasi contains about 371 km ² and has a population of about 40,000 inhabitants, and is part of the Republic of Kosovo.

== Demographics ==
Most of Hasi's population are Albanians, but censuses prior to the Second World War show that there were also other communities that lived in the region such as Serbs, Croats and Slovenes.

The registrations of 2011 result in this percentage of the Has population by age: -age 0–14, 7837 people or 39.87% -age 15–24, 3289 people or 16.07% -age 25–59, 6996 people or 35.06% -age 60–79, 1395 people or 7.1% -age 80+, 143 people or 0.73%

== Culture ==
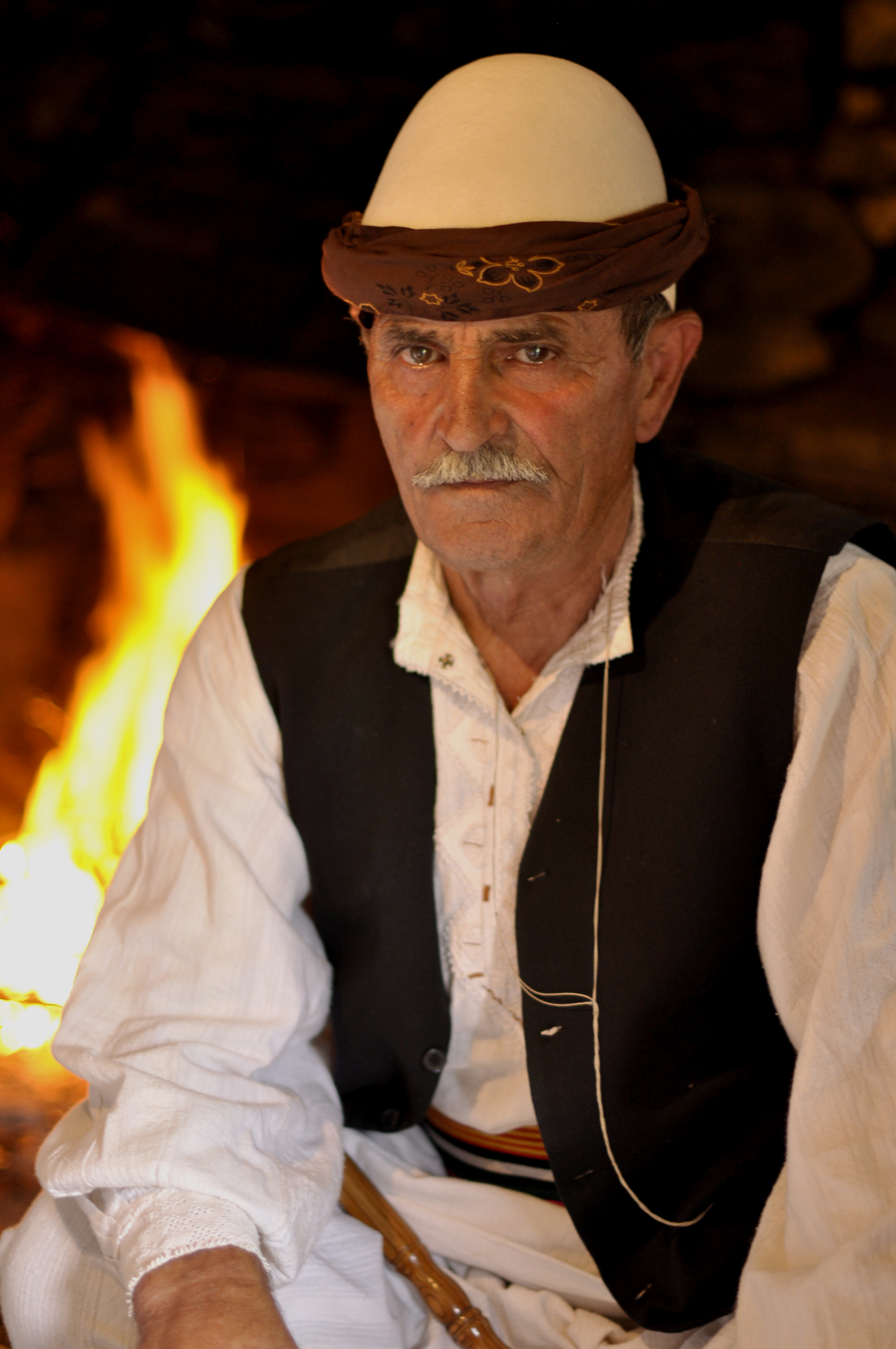
Old man of Has.

Many Albanian and foreign authors have been interested in the typology of Albanian national costumes and about their age. Albanian Ethnographer Rrok Zojzi concludes that Albanian folk costumes belong to two main types of traditional clothing, the type of clothing with cloak and other variants. The primary menswear in Has is Tirq, although the work of men's wardrobe until the first half of the 20th century in the region of Has was formed with the technique of coating the kilt.

Wearing the kilt for men, up to the first years after World War II was also prevalent among residents of Has villages in Albania, but after entering into cooperation this clothing gradually disappeared and found no more use, while in the Has villages of Kosovo it found use up until the 1980s, but it was not tailored by the residents anymore like it used to be.

The Hasi Jehon Festival takes place in the region of Hasi annually. The festival was first in May 1976 organized and is an Albanian folklore festival that promotes and preserves Albanian spiritual heritage through folk music and dances from all the Albanian-inhabited regions.

== Sights ==
=== Pashtriku ===
Pashtriku is the most famous mountain in the Has district which is known for its characteristic limestone rocks. On the right of the greater heights of the mountain there lies a very deep hole with popular vocabulary called " the great pond" and the height 1700 m above sea level is the fountain of the Dragon (Dragovodi) which stands for very cold crystal water.

=== Daci Cave (2600 P.E.S—1200 P.E.S) ===
Daci Cave is located about 10 km east of Kruma. This cave is found in the neighborhood of Dac, in the village Mujaj. According to archeological research, the cave was inhabited from the Bronze Age, and Iron Age up until the early antiquity.

=== Cave of Pigeons ===
This cave is found in the ridge of Pashtriku Mountains, between the village borders of Vlahen, Dobrune and Grecine. It is a karst limestone cave over 30 m long, 11 m wide, 5 m high where there are many wild pigeons, hence the name.

=== Pine of Gjini ===
300-year-old tree, near the village of Gjinaj, 740 m above sea level, with a mushroom-shaped crown, a height of 20 m and a trunk diameter of 1 m.

=== Domaj Fountain ===
Located near the village of Domaj, 400m above sea level. The spring emerges at the lithological-tectonic contact, limestone-terrigenous with a flow of 300 l/sec.

== Notable people ==
- Pjeter Bogdani
- Pjeter Mazreku
- Xhevat Qena
- Xhafer Deva
- Shaqir Totaj
- Elvis Rexhbeçaj
- Muharrem Qena

== See also ==
- Has District, Albania

== Sources ==
- Domi, Ali (1980). Të njohim vendlindjen. Shtëpia Botuese e Librit Shkollor Tiranë.
- Çoçaj, Nexhat (2014). Hasi :Enciklopedi etnokulturore II : Gjeografia, trashëgimia familjare, jeta sociale. Mileniumi i Ri. ISBN 9789928174017.
- Pulaha, Selami (1984). Popullsia Shqiptare e Kosoves Gjate Shekujve XV XVI. Tirana: 8 Nëntori.
