= Reka e Keqe =

Ethnographic region in Kosovo

Reka e Keqe is an ethnographic subregion of the greater Reka region of the Dukagjini Plain of western Kosovo, sitting along the border with Albania and covering a number of villages between Gjakova and Junik. It is inhabited almost exclusively by Albanians.

== Geography ==
Reka e Keqe, which translates to "Bad River" in Albanian, is a ravine formed by three rivers – the Carragojë, Erenik and Trava - in the northwest of the municipality of Gjakova. The ravine extends to the southern borders of Deçan, and runs 25 km southeast towards the town of Gjakova itself. It is situated some 10–15 km from the Albanian border. The region derives its name from its geographical position by these rivers. The word Reka itself is a Slavic word, meaning "river". Reka e Keqe is a smaller subregion of the greater Reka region of the Dukagjini Plain, which consists of around 80 villages known for their resistance against occupying forces. Reka e Keqe consists of numerous rural areas between Junik and Gjakova - including Babaj i Bokës, Berjah, Botushë, Brovinë, Dobrosh, Duzhnje, Korenicë, Molliq, Morinë, Nivokaz, Ponoshec, Popoc, Ramoc, Rracaj, Shishman, Stubëll and more.

Reka e Keqe lies along one of Kosovo's main alluvial zones, where intergranular sediments such as sand and gravel have formed productive aquifers. These groundwater reserves are important for local use in drinking water, irrigation and industry.

== History ==
=== Middle Ages ===
Prior to the Ottoman conquest of Kosovo and during the time of the Kingdom of Serbia, Reka e Keqe formed part of the Reka župa, which was situated north of present-day Gjakova. According to the Dečani chrysobulls of the 1330s CE, the Dečani monastery had a tenure in Reka župa of 4 villages and 3 hamlets. Aside from some cases of Albanian anthroponomy, the names of the inhabitants of the villages of the Reka župa in the first half of the 14th century were mainly of Slavonic origin, but these Slavonic names were also used by Albanians during this period. The Slavicisation of Albanian families in these documents is evident, most notably in cases where clearly Albanian families bore Slavic personal names, or where members of the same family carried both Albanian and Slavic names. This anthroponymic mixture reflects the co-existence of Albanian and Slav naming traditions, and in many cases, points to an ethnic symbiosis and social processes that accompanied the historical development of the region during this time.

The use of Slavic names by Albanians came as a result of the conversion of Catholic Albanians to Orthodoxy, which was pressured and influenced by the Orthodox Church and the state during the period of Serbian rule in Kosovo. The conversion of Catholic Albanians to Orthodoxy was higher in Reka e Keqe, where important Serbian Orthodox monasteries were located. During the early period of Ottoman rule, many of the villages of Reka e Keqe were part of the Nahiya of Altun-ili. Most of the villages in the Nahiya of Altun-ili were dominated by inhabitants with Albanian anthroponomy. This is an indication that during the 15th century (as supported by Ottoman defters), the lands between Junik and Gjakova were inhabited by a dominant ethnic Albanian majority.

=== Late Ottoman Period ===
The villages of Reka e Keqe, Has, Gjakova Highlands and Anadrini have traditionally relied on Gjakova as an administrative centre, as well as for trade and other purposes. Volunteers from Reka e Keqe took part in the attack against Mehmed Ali Pasha in Gjakova in 1878 as part of the anti-Ottoman actions of the League of Prizren.

=== Kosovo War ===
On 27–28 April 1999, Serbian forces conducted a large-scale operation against Albanian civilians named “Operation Reka” in Reka e Keqe, massacring at least 350 ethnic Albanian civilians and expelling thousands more to Albania. With 309 bodies later discovered in mass graves near Belgrade, the massacre in Reka e Keqe stands as one of the gravest crimes against civilians during the Kosovo War and among the worst atrocities of the 1990s Yugoslav conflicts.

On the morning of 27 April 1999, Serbian forces launched a coordinated sweep through the villages of Reka e Keqe, forcibly expelling thousands of Albanian civilians and killing dozens. 68 civilians were killed in Korenicë alone. At a checkpoint in Mejë, police separated 274 men and boys from the convoys heading toward Albania, later executing them; 252 of their bodies were found in a mass grave in Batajnica in 2001. Despite convictions by the ICTY of top Yugoslav military and police leaders for their roles in Operation Reka, no one has been prosecuted in Serbian courts for the massacre or the concealment of evidence. All of the victims were Kosovo Albanian civilians, and there was no evidence that any of the victims were armed or took an active part in hostilities between the KLA and the Serbian forces.
