= Mazrek =

Mazrek may refer to several places in Albania:

- Mazrek, Prizren, a village in the district of Prizren
- Mazrek, Shkodër, a village in the municipality of Shkodër
  - Church ruins, Mazrek, a cultural monument
- Mazrek, Gramsh, a village in the municipality of Gramsh
- Mazrek, Tirana, a village in the municipality of Tirana
