= Ponoševac clashes =

- Part of the Kosovo War
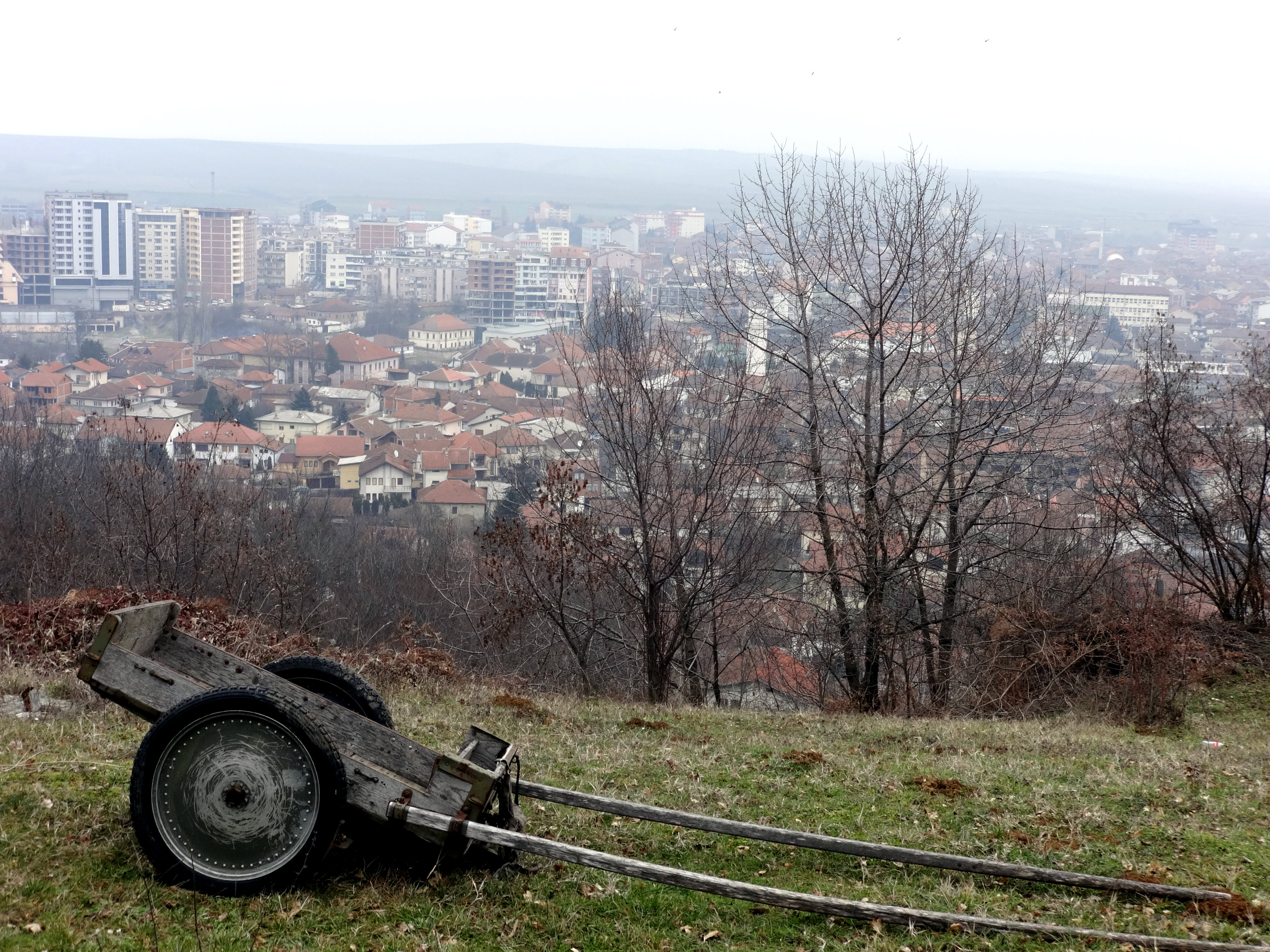
- A view of Đakovica
Date	3 to 6 May 1998
Location	Ponoševac, near Đakovica, District of Đakovica, Autonomous Province of Kosovo and Metohija, Federal Republic of Yugoslavia
Result	See aftermath
Territorial changes	Yugoslav forces regain control over Ponoševac

Belligerents
(Serbia and Montenegro) FR Yugoslavia	Kosovo Liberation Army

Commanders and leaders
(Serbia and Montenegro) Sreten Lukić (Serbia and Montenegro) Božidar Delić (Serbia and Montenegro) Radomir Čolić	Ramush Haradinaj; Rezak Alija; Hasan Alija

Units involved
Ministry of Internal Affairs; Đakovica SUP; Yugoslav Army; Priština Corps; 549th Prizren Motorized Brigade; 53rd Border Battalion	Kosovo Liberation Army; 134th Brigade; Dukagjin operational zone units; Village defense councils; Smonica mujahideen unit

Strength
(Serbia and Montenegro) 30 policemen (reinforcements added on during the clashes)	50 militants initially; 150-200 militants in total

Casualties and losses
(Serbia and Montenegro) 5 to 6 wounded	2 killed, 2 wounded 1 arrested

The Ponoševac clashes were fought between the Kosovo Liberation Army (KLA) and the Ministry of Internal Affairs (MUP) in and around the village of Ponoševac, near Đakovica, during the Kosovo War. The fighting occurred on 3 May, lasting until 6 May, two months since the Attack on Prekaz.

The clashes were part of a wider escalation in western Kosovo in the spring of 1998, as the KLA under the command of Ramush Haradinaj launched operations near the Đakovica-Dečani-Peć road, capturing multiple villages, including Glođane, Dašinovac, Prilep, Babaloć, and the town of Junik.

== Background ==
Following World War II, Kosovo was given the status of an autonomous province within the Socialist Republic of Serbia, one of six constitutional republics of the Socialist Federal Republic of Yugoslavia. After the death of Yugoslavia's long-time leader (Josip Broz Tito) in 1980, Yugoslavia's political system began to unravel. In 1989, Belgrade revoked Kosovo's autonomy. Kosovo, a province inhabited predominantly by ethnic Albanians, was of great historical and cultural significance to Serbs, who had formed a majority there before the mid-19th century, but by 1990 represented only about 10 percent of the population. Alarmed by their dwindling numbers, the province's Serbs began to fear that they were being "squeezed out" by the Albanians, and ethnic tensions worsened. As soon as Kosovo's autonomy was abolished, a minority government run by Serbs and Montenegrins was appointed by Serbian President Slobodan Milošević to oversee the province, enforced by thousands of heavily armed paramilitaries from Serbia-proper. Albanian culture was systematically repressed and hundreds of thousands of Albanians working in state-owned companies lost their jobs.

In 1996, a group of Albanian nationalists calling themselves the Kosovo Liberation Army (KLA) began attacking the Yugoslav Army (Serbo-Croatian: Vojska Jugoslavije; VJ) and the Serbian Ministry of Internal Affairs (Serbo-Croatian: Ministarstvo unutrašnjih poslova; MUP) in Kosovo. Their goal was to separate the province from the rest of Yugoslavia, which following the separation of Slovenia, Croatia, Macedonia and Bosnia-Herzegovina in 1991–92, was just a rump federation consisting of Serbia and Montenegro. At first, the KLA carried out hit-and-run attacks (31 in 1996, 55 in 1997, and 66 in January and February 1998 alone). It quickly gained popularity among young Kosovo Albanians, many of whom rejected the non-violent resistance to Yugoslav authorities advocated by the politician Ibrahim Rugova and favoured a more aggressive approach. The organization received a significant boost in 1997, when an armed uprising in neighbouring Albania led to thousands of weapons from the Albanian Army's depots being looted. Many of these weapons ended up in the hands of the KLA. The KLA also received substantial funds from its involvement in the drug trade.

The KLA's popularity skyrocketed after the VJ and MUP attacked the compound of KLA leader Adem Jashari in March 1998, killing him, his closest associates and most of his family. The attack prompted thousands of young Kosovo Albanians to join the ranks of the KLA, fueling the Kosovar uprising that eventually erupted in the spring of 1998.

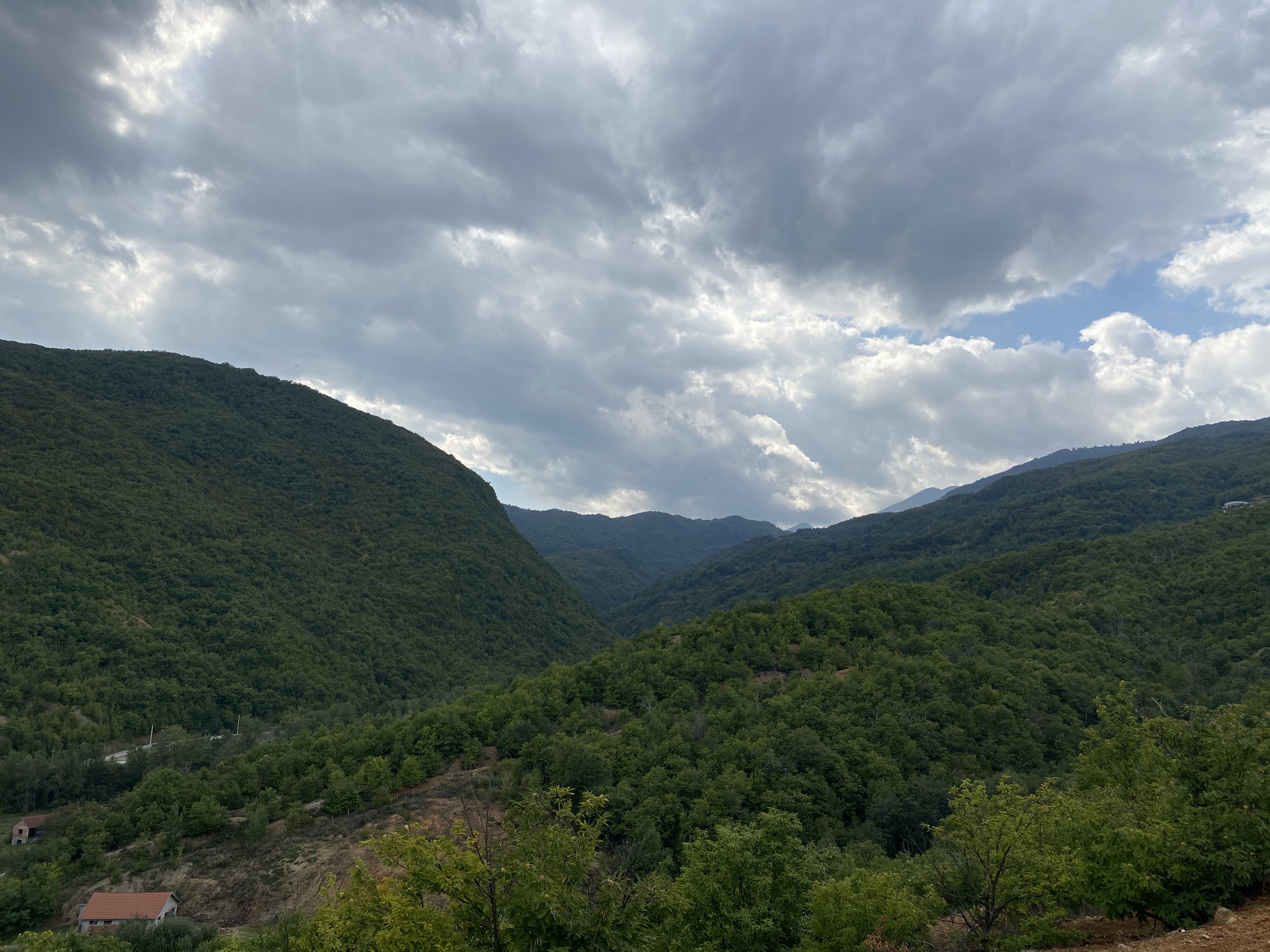
A section of the mountains near Gjakova

Ponoševac is a village located in the District of Đakovica, located in southwest Kosovo, along the border with Albania. It is situated on the road west of Đakovica and east of the Morina border crossing area, southeast of the Košare border region. According to the 1991 census, the population was over 90% Albanian.

== Events ==
3 May

On 3 May, at approximately 10:30 AM, an ethnic Albanian, later identified as Hasan Rama, was detained by a Ponoševac police unit for questioning. The police unit was fired on from a house in the village, wounding two policemen. Minutes later, the police station of Ponoševac was attacked. Reinforcements arrived, reportedly for both the MUP and the KLA. Fighting ensued throughout the night and into the next day. The sounds of mortar, machine-gun, and rifle fire could be heard across the border into Albania. Organization for Security and Co-operation in Europe (OSCE) diplomats spoke with the Yugoslav border guards. The diplomats had been told that Albanian militants launched an attack on the police station of the village. According to Tim Judah, a British reporter specializing in the Balkans, the KLA had surrounded the police in the village. The Democratic League of Kosovo (LDK) information commissioner reported that an Albanian civilian was killed by a Yugoslav sniper, after their car was turned back. A roadblock was formed outside of Ponoševac, blocking the road to Ðakovica.

4 May

On 4 May, the police reported that around 50 militants had attacked the police station. OSCE ambassador Daan Everts reported from the north Albanian border town of Qafa e Morinës, near Bajram Curri, that "the Serbs said it was an attack on a police station.” Italian military attaché Sergio Russo stated, “there must have been heavy retaliation," adding that "things look dangerous in this part of the border. The Albanians report a buildup of Yugoslav military units." Albanian sources added that houses were on fire. According to a Reuters reporter, a police van was hit by a stinger used by the KLA, wounding four policemen. The wounded policemen were taken to a hospital in Priština. The police had managed to form a cordon around the village, trapping a group of up to 150 to 200 militants. Clashes broke out in the neighboring village of Popovac. One Roma civilian was killed, and another two wounded. An Albanian civilian was wounded as well. During the evening, the wounded civilians were taken to a hospital in Đakovica.

5 May

On 5 May, approximately 200 militants broke through the police cordon in the village. At the town of Junik, Foreign observers were denied access to the Ponoševac area. From there, they could hear gun and mortar fire. An unidentified body was found near the village. In addition to Ponoševac, the villages of Morina, Smonica, and Popovac were subject to fighting in the past several days. Clashes had subsided during the day, leaving the village abandoned and largely damaged.

== Aftermath ==
Although the authorities reported that they had driven the militants off, artillery and mortar fire could still be heard nearby. The road leading to Ponoševac was strewn with dead cows and horses. The situation in Ponoševac was tense, as the KLA had reportedly retreated into nearby villages. The Yugoslav Army reported that their border guards were under fire. Vreme stated that supplies were being brought to the police in the village in armored vehicles driving at full speed. Five to six policemen had been wounded in the fighting, as well as three Roma civilians.

The Federal Republic of Yugoslavia asserted that between 1 January and 29 May, 356 attacks were reported on Yugoslav authorities, mainly in the municipalities of Glogovac, Srbica, Klina, Dečani, and Đakovica.

== Sources ==
- Judah, Tim (2002). Kosovo: War and Revenge. New Haven, Connecticut: Yale University Press. ISBN 978-0-300-09725-2.
