= Vraniq =

Vraniq may refer to:

- Vraniq, Gjakova, a village in Kosovo
- Vraniq, Suva Reka, a village in Kosovo

== See also ==
- Vranić (disambiguation)
