= Beci =

Beci is a surname. Notable people with the surname include:

- Benet Beci (born 1965), Albanian politician, finance professional, and politician
- Dritmir Beci (born 1996), Albanian footballer
- Lorenzo Beci (active 1517–1521), Italian painter

== See also ==
- Beći, Bosnia
- Beci, Kosovo
- Bezzi, another surname
