= Vranić =

Vranić may refer to:

- Vranić, Serbia, a settlement near Belgrade
- Vranić (surname), a South Slavic surname
- Vranić, Croatia, a former settlement near Brestovac, Croatia
- Vranić, Gjakova, a village in Kosovo
- Vranić, Suva Reka, a village in Kosovo
- Vranić, Kotor Varoš, a village in Bosnia and Herzegovina

== See also ==
- Vranići (disambiguation)
- Vrančić
