= Zhabel =

Zhabel: Zhabel (Albanian); Жабељ/Žabelj (Serbian)
- Village
- Interactive map of Zhabel
- Coordinates: 42°26′35″N 20°26′58″E
- Country: Kosovo
- District: Gjakova
- Municipality: Gjakova
- Elevation: 446 m (1,463 ft)

Population (2024)
  - Total: 242
- Time zone: UTC+1 (Central European Time)
  - Summer (DST): UTC+2 (CEST)

Zhabel (Serbian: Жабељ, Žabelj) is a village in the Dushkaja subregion in the Gjakova municipality of Kosovo. It is inhabited exclusively by Albanians.

== Geography ==
Zhabel is 20 km north of Gjakova. It is positioned in two valleys and is composed of 2 main sections - Zhabeli Plak (Old Zhabel) and Zhabeli i Ri (New Zhabel).

== Toponomy ==
Zhabel consists of Albanian toponomy, such as Shpati (slope), Grykat (gorges), Ara e Madhe (big field), Kodra e Trimave (hill of the brave), Përroni i Vogël (little stream), Fangi, Lugina e Maliqëve (valley of the Maliqi) Livadhet e Gata (long meadows), Lugu i Sokolëve, Livadhet e Mëdha (big meadows), Kroni i Mllokës, Kodra e Malësorëve (hill of the highlanders) etc.

== History ==
Zhabel's inhabitants lived in the locality of Zhabeli Plak. In between Zhabeli Plak and Zhabeli i Ri, on the Kodra e Malësorëve (hill of the highlanders), traces of settlement can be observed. It is said that disease fell upon the initial settlement and the population was greatly affected. Many died and were buried in the place called the Hasallak graves. Many moved to Zhabel i Ri.

In 1913 as part of war crimes committed against ethnic Albanians intended to transform the ethnic character of the region, Montenegrin forces pillaged and burned down the Albanian village of Zhabel and massacred the local population.

In between the two World Wars, Yugoslavia settled 8 Serb and Montenegrin colonist families in Zhabel with the intention of changing the traditionally Albanian ethnic structure of the region. Their settlement in the area was short-lived.

== Anthroponomy ==
Zhabeli Plak consists of the Maliqi family. Zhabeli i Ri consists of families belonging to the Albanian Morina and Berisha tribes - these families are the Haziraj, Ukaj, Smajlaj and Delijaj. The Catholic families of this neighbourhood - the Kaçanukët (of the Nikaj-Mërtur tribe) and the Dedaj - have moved to the village of Lugbunar near Gjakova.
