= Agron Rama =

Agron Osman Rama
- Statue of Agron Rama in Gjakova
- Born: 10 August 1972; Smonica, Đakovica, SAP Kosovo, SFR Yugoslavia (present-day Kosovo)
- Died: 29 January 1999 (aged 26); Rogovë, FR Yugoslavia
- Military career
- Allegiance: Kosovo Liberation Army
- Rank: Commander
- Unit: 134th Brigade "Bedri Shala"
- Conflicts: Battle of Glođane
- Memorials: Agron Rama Stadium

Agron Osman Rama (10 August 1972 – 29 January 1999) was a Kosovo Albanian commander of the Kosovo Liberation Army (KLA) during the Kosovo War. He served as the first KLA commander for the Reka e Keqe region, based in Smolica, and was later appointed commander of the 134th Brigade "Bedri Shala".

== Biography ==
He was born in Smolica, near Gjakova, on 10 August 1972. His parents Osman and Shake Rama had seven children: three sons and four daughters. Agron was the first child. He completed his primary and secondary education in his hometown. In 1990, he carried out his Yugoslav military service and then emigrated to Switzerland where he worked for two years. In 1997, he joined the Kosovo Liberation Army (KLA). He served as the first KLA commander for the Reka e Keqe region. Following the emergence of the KLA in Drenica and Gllogjan, the village of Smolica also entered the fray under the leadership of Agron Rama, serving as a key point along the Kosovo-Albania route where hundreds of men were able to smuggle weapons. His home became a base for the KLA.

Rama became involved in the organization and logistics of the KLA in the Dukagjin Operational Zone. In early 1998, Rama formed a KLA unit based in Smolica. He led the unit during the fighting throughout April and August.

On 2 August 1998, Yugoslav forces launched an offensive against KLA positions in the area of Smolica, intended to destroy KLA forces, seize Stubla and Donji Nec, secure the Ramoc sector, and reopen the Đakovica–Ponoševac–Batuša road. That day, Rama evacuated his family to Albania before returning to the village. The village was burned and KLA fighters subsequently pulled out. The village fell to Yugoslav police units.

During fighting in the Reka e Keqe region in December 1998, Rama was seriously injured. He managed to retreat along with other fighters and recovered in makeshift military hospitals. In January 1999, he was appointed commander of the 134th Brigade "Bedri Shala" by the commander of the Dukagjini Operational Area, Ramush Haradinaj.

On 26 January, he and his group began an attempt to move toward the Kosovo-Albania border to obtain arms and reinforce their forces. After several engagements along the route, Rama was wounded again during fighting near Goden. On 29 January, the group reached Rogovë, where they became surrounded and engaged in a final battle. Rama, already seriously wounded, was sheltered in a local house but died from his wounds that same day, at the age of 26.

== Legacy ==
In 2009, a city square in his hometown of Gjakova was named in his honor. A statue of him also exists in a complex in the city.

In June 2012, he was awarded the Hero of Kosovo Order.
