= Smolica =

Smolica: Smolica/Smolicë (Albanian); Смоница/Smonica (Serbian)
- Village
- Location in Kosovo
- Location: Kosovo
- District: Gjakova
- Municipality: Gjakova

Population (2024)
  - Total: 266
- Time zone: UTC+1 (CET)
  - Summer (DST): UTC+2 (CEST)

Smolica (Albanian indefinite form: Smolicë; Serbian: Смоница, Smonica) is a village in the District of Gjakova, Kosovo.

== Demographics ==
According to the 2024 census, the village had a population of 266 inhabitants, all ethnic Albanians.

== History ==
During the Kosovo War, the village was the site of fighting between Kosovo Liberation Army (KLA) militants and Yugoslav forces. By early 1998, a KLA unit under Agron Rama was formed in Smolica. In retaliation for the attack on the Jashari compound in February 1998, the KLA ambushed a Yugoslav convoy near Smolica on 22 March 1998. In response, Yugoslav President Slobodan Milošević launched a counterinsurgency campaign.

Attacks on Smolica began on 6 April by the Ministry of Internal Affairs (MUP) along with the Yugoslav Army (VJ). The KLA retained control of the village, and subsequently expanded their control of territory, starting from Nec and extending to Junik. On 2 August 1998, Yugoslav forces launched an offensive against KLA positions in the area of Smolica, intended to destroy KLA forces, seize Stubla and Donji Nec, secure the Ramoc sector, and reopen the Đakovica–Ponoševac–Batuša road. In the early morning, Smolica was attacked. The fighting continued until approximately 19:00, when Albanian families were evacuated from the village and the KLA withdrew. It subsequently fell to Yugoslav police units.
