= Shishman =

Shishman may refer to:

- Shishman dynasty, a medieval Bulgarian royal dynasty
- Shishman of Vidin, the eponymous founder of the dynasty
- Shishman (son of Michael Shishman)
- Ivan Shishman of Bulgaria
- Shishman, Gjakova, a village in Kosovo
