= Dujakë =

Dujakë Dujak
- Location within Kosovo
- Coordinates: 42°27′22″N 20°22′11″E
- Country: Kosovo
- District: Peja
- Municipality: Gjakova
- Elevation: 508 m (1,667 ft)

Population (2024)
  - Total: 519
- Time zone: UTC+1
  - Summer (DST): UTC+2

Dujakë (Serbian: Dujak) is a village in the Gjakova municipality of Kosovo. It is located 8–10 km from Gjakova on the Gjakova-Peja highway.

== Geography ==
Neighboring villages include Skivjan, Planqor, Hereq, Jasiq, Fieraj, and Novosellë. The village lies on flat terrain but borders a hill named Mujk to the west.

The Krena river runs through town.

== Demographics ==
The village was mentioned in the 1485 Ottoman defter with 22 homes, and in the 1571 Ottoman defter with 44 homes. The Ottoman defters from the years of 1485 and 1571 indicate that Dujakë was historically inhabited by an Albanian population, the inhabitants names were mainly Albanian.

The all-Albanian village's first inhabitants were from the Noci family, joined later by such families as the Muslija, Bushati, Alija, Gaxherri, Llolluni, Knushi, Frrokaj, Luli, Mazreku, and Shoshi, from such tribes as the Thaçi and the Berisha.

Both Muslims and Christians live here, though there is no mosque or church in town. The Muslims use the Skivjan mosque, while the Christians worship at the Plançor church. The population speak in the Gheg dialect of the Albanian language.

Population table
1948	1953	1961	1971	1981	1991	2011	2024
501	562	631	831	1,143	1,319	715	519

The population has declined due largely to emigration.

Population by religion
Village	2011 total	Muslim	Catholic	Others
Dujakë	715	524	191	0

== Economy ==
The economy of Dujakë is supported largely by remittance from emigrants, including many in Switzerland, Germany, Austria, France, the Netherlands, and the United States.

== Culture ==
Several cultural heritage sites as defined by the Republic of Kosovo government are in Dujakë, including the medieval archaeological site (no. 3654), Ahmet Islam's Tower (no. 1710), Arif Musa's Tower (no. 1709), and Sahit Avdyli's Tower (no. 1707).

== History ==
Dujakë has been inhabited since antiquity, and archaeological evidence was found during construction work on the farms and the highway. An Ottoman defter (tax record) from 1485 records the village, as discussed in Austrian historian Karl Kaser’s Der Mythos vom Wandervolk der Albaner: Landwirtschaft in den albanischen Gebieten. The following is noted:

The following is noted: Dujak (1485)~60 livestock~600 kg of flour or 60 acres taxed to the Ottoman Empire~79% plowed with corn~10% plowed with beans~while on the rest are cultivated wheat, barley, and grapes.

Additionally, during the 15th century, all of Dujakë's inhabitants had Albanian anthroponomy, indicating that Albanians inhabited the village and its surroundings.

Austrian historian Dr. Joseph Müller noted in 1844 that there were 40 Albanians living in Dujakë. However, by 1930, the League of Nations noted significant displacement during the Yugoslav colonization of Kosovo there. On March 3, 1945, a resident of Dujakë, Ahmet Sejd Nocaj, died in the 2-month liberation of the Drenica region from Axis occupation under the leadership of Shaban Polluzha.
