= Matija Mazarek =

- Матија Мазарек
- Born: 1726; Janjevo, Ottoman Empire (modern Kosovo)
- Died: Unknown
- Other names: Matija Masarek; Matija Mazrreku
- Citizenship: Ottoman Empire
- Occupation: Catholic archbishop

Matija Mazarek or Matija Masarek (Serbian: Матија Мазарек; Albanian: Matej Mazreku; 1726–fl. 1792) was an 18th-century Catholic priest. In the second half of the 18th century he was the archbishop of the Roman Catholic Diocese of Skopje. His reports to the Vatican are an important source for demography study of his diocese.

== Career ==
Most probably of Albanian origin, Mazarek was born in Janjevo in 1726. The name Mazrek(u), which means horse breeder in Albanian, is found throughout all Albanian regions. Elsie links the name to Mazreku, an Albanian tribe north of Shkodër.

Before 1743, Jovan Nikolović (or Gjon Nikolle) sent Mazarek to Italy to be trained for his religious tasks. In 1750 he was archbishop of the Roman Catholic Diocese of Skopje.

Many of his ancestors and descendants were notable Catholic priests, such as:

- Pjeter Mazarek, 17th-century archbishop of the Roman Catholic Archdiocese of Bar
- Josip Mazarek, his brother, a Catholic priest.

== Reports ==
He wrote notable reports to Vatican during the second half of the 18th century. Those reports include description about migrations of people from Malësia (region now divided by Montenegro and Albania) to a region he called Serbia (Kosovo is the likely region). In 1792 he reported that villages around Gjakova received influx of Catholics from Albania.

His reports include many complaints about Albanians who arrived from Malesia. His prayers included "Ab albanensibus libera nos Domine" (English: Lord, save us from Albanians).

== Sources ==
- Malaj, Edmond (2013). "Familje fisnike të Drishtit mesjetar (Noble Families of Medieval Drivasto". Studime Historike. 3–4.
- Maiocchi, Luca (2009). "The Coexistence of Catholic and Muslim Communities in 18th Century Kosovo". In Thede Kahl (ed.). Christen und Muslime: interethnische Koexistenz in südosteuropäischen Peripheriegebieten. LIT Verlag Münster. ISBN 978-3-643-50058-8.
- Elsie, Robert (2015). "The Mazreku Tribe". The Tribes of Albania: History, Society and Culture. I.B. Tauris. ISBN 978-1-78453-401-1.
