= Dedaj (surname) =

Dedaj is an Albanian surname. Notable people with the surname include:

- Anton Dedaj (born 1980), Croatian footballer
- Arjola Dedaj (born 1981), Italian Paralympic athlete
- Dugagjin Dedaj (born 1989), Swiss footballer
