= Romani people in Kosovo =

Minority group in Kosovo

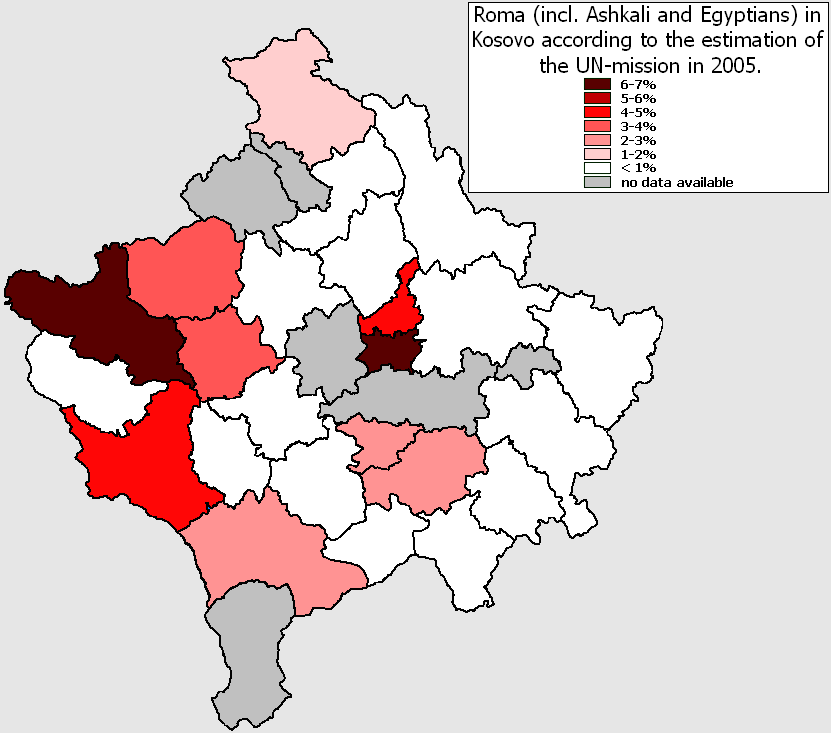
- Romani in Kosovo according to the estimation of the UN-mission in 2005

Regions with significant populations
- Pristina, Gjakova, Ferizaj, Vushtrri, Kosovo Polje, Mitrovica and Peja

Languages
- Balkan Romani, Albanian, Serbian

Religion
- Christianity, Islam

Romani people in Kosovo (Albanian: Romët në Kosovë) are part of the wider Romani people community, the biggest minority group in Europe. Kosovo Roma speak the Balkan Romani language in most cases, but also the languages that surround them, such as Serbian and Albanian. In 2011 there were 36,694 Romani, Ashkali and Balkan Egyptians living in Kosovo. However, the minorities are unrelated to each other and were only put together based on appearance.

Many Romani were targeted by the Kosovo Liberation Army along with Serbs during the Kosovo War as they were considered to be allied with Serbs and Serbian national interests. Romani in Kosovo are much depleted from their former numbers, and have been in both stationary and nomadic residence there since the 15th century. The Kosovo Liberation Army were reported to have expelled 50,000 Romani from Kosovo, forcing them to take refuge in central Serbia. Many of them have since returned to Kosovo.

== Subgroups ==
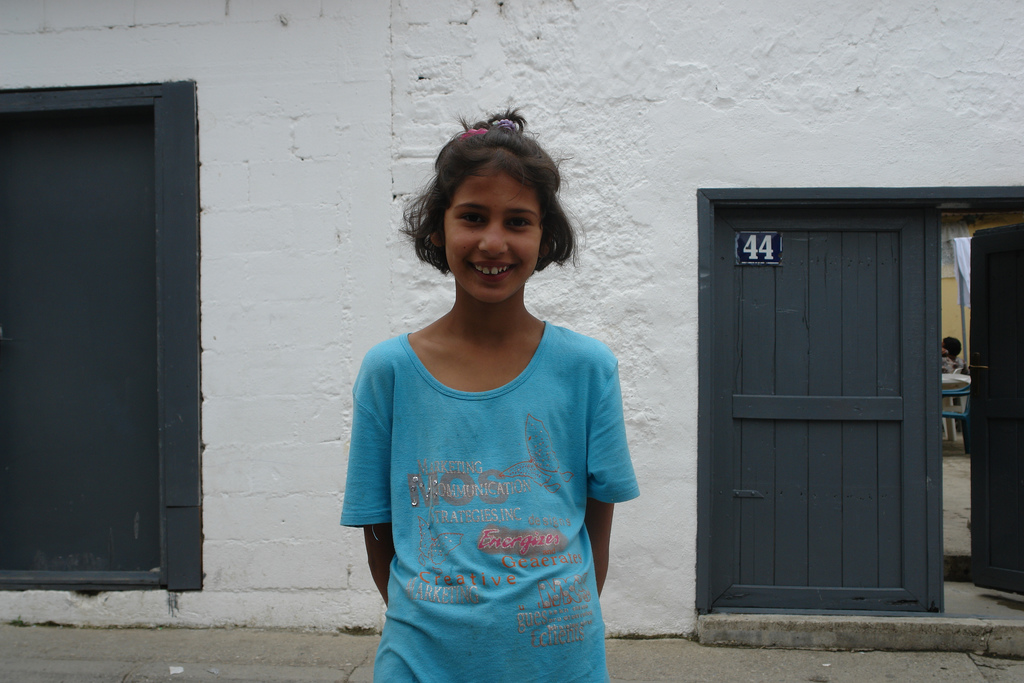
Romani girl in Prizren

As in other parts of the Balkans, the denomination of Romani has always been subject to outside pressure. In the official census, the label Romani is used officially by the state.

Serbian Romani:

- Kovači (Serbian Orthodox)
- Čergari (Serbian Orthodox)
- Srpski Romani (Serbian Orthodox)
- Bugurdjije

Polylingual:

- Arlije (Cultural Muslims)
- Gurbeti (Cultural Muslims, Serbian Orthodox)
- Mixed Romani

Albanian Romani:

- Belajie (Cultural Muslims)
- Muhadjeri (Cultural Muslims)
- Ashkali (Cultural Muslims) (self-identify)

Other:

- Turkish Roma
  - Divanjoldjije (Cultural Muslims)
- Croat Romani
  - Lipljan Romani (Catholic)
  - Janjevo Romani (Catholic)

== Political representation ==
Four seats in the Assembly of Kosovo are reserved for parties representing the Romani, Ashkali and Balkan Egyptian communities.

=== Romani political parties in Kosovo ===
- United Roma Party of Kosovo
- Kosovar New Romani Party

== Education ==
The Roma community experience substantially lower educational participation and attainment, partly due to poverty, discrimination, language barriers and inadequate educational resources and support. This is particularly true among women who face additional barriers because of early marriage, gender norms, and expectations that girls remain at home. Roma children in Kosovo generally receive education in Albanian or Serbian, as education in the Romani language is limited. Third-level education is not attained by the majority of Roma.

== Discrimination ==
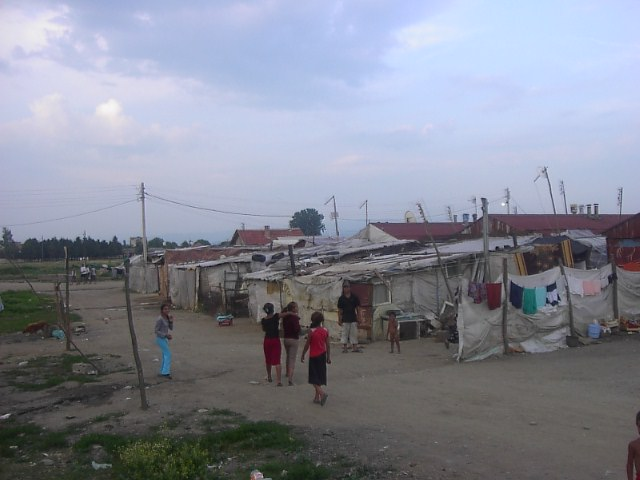
Refugee camp of Kosovar Romani in southern Central Serbia, close to Kosovo in 2003

Following the cessation of the Kosovo War in June 1999 and the subsequent return of ethnic Albanians from abroad, approximately four fifths of Kosovo's pre-1999 RAE population had been expelled from their homes. Many Kosovo Albanians regarded the Roma as having collaborated with the Yugoslav Army. Roma were claimed to have assisted the Serbian police in plundering Albanian homes and shops to supply the military action, and in burying the Albanian dead. According to Roma accounts, the Yugoslav authorities coerced them into providing assistance. Many Roma were also recruited into the Yugoslav Army to "help terrorise Albanians" and Roma homes were marked with an "R" on their doors to distinguish them from Albanian houses when the Serbian paramilitaries arrived to plunder.

Albanians regarded these acts as further evidence that Roma had allied themselves with the enemies of the Albanian nation, and thus many Roma were targeted by the returning Albanians. The departure of the Yugoslav army and police was followed by a series of "retaliatory attacks". By June 1999, the Romani mahala of Mitrovica was burned down and the inhabitants fled. Around 3,500 Roma took shelter in a school in Kosovo Polje following threats and the Roma community of Gjakova were warned to leave their homes. The Romani quarter of Brekoc in Gjakova and Arbanë in Prizren were also burned down. German KFOR troops also discovered 15 severely beaten Roma, accused of taking part in looting and collaborating with the Serbs, in a police office in Prizren that was being used by the KLA as a prison. 5,000 displaced Roma gathered in a KFOR built camp in Obiliq where they were subject to insults and attacks by Albanians.

Romani in Kosovo today live in constant fear of further ethnic unrest. Romani displaced in North Kosovo are today housed in lead-infested camps in North Mitrovica. There is ongoing campaign for rehousing and proper health provisions for the families affected, and a fatality estimate ranges from 27 to 81. In 2007, Human Rights Officer, Claude Cahn, of the Office of the United Nations High Commissioner for Human Rights, wrote:

Today, persecution of members of these RAE communities continues, manifested in their systematic exclusion from access to fundamental human rights. Racial discrimination against RAE communities in Kosovo is pervasive, depriving tens of thousands of their dignity. Anti-Gypsy sentiment among the ethnic Albanian majority is widespread. Today, RAE and others considered Gypsies in Kosovo live in a state of pervasive fear, fostered by routine intimidation, verbal harassment, and periodic racist assaults. Those negotiating Kosovo’s future have effectively abandoned the RAE communities.

Since the declaration of independence in 2008, the situation of the Roma community in Kosovo has seen some improvements, including guaranteed parliamentary representation through allocated seats and reductions in poverty levels compared to earlier periods. However, Roma communities continue to face challenges related to discrimination, socioeconomic disadvantage, and limited access to certain public services and opportunities.

=== Mitrovica camps ===
Returning IDPs were housed by UNMIK in North Mitrovica in a lead mine site, and 27 died of lead poisoning.

== See also ==
- Ashkali and Balkan Egyptians
- Romani people in Albania
- Romani people in North Macedonia
- Romani people in Serbia

== Sources ==
- Cahn, Claude (2007). "Birth of a Nation: Kosovo and the Persecution of Pariah Minorities" (PDF). German Law Journal. 8 (1): 81–94. doi:10.1017/S2071832200005423. ISSN 2071-8322. S2CID 141025735. Archived from the original (PDF) on 15 February 2015.
- Kenrick, Donald (2007). Historical Dictionary of the Gypsies (Romanies). Scarecrow Press. ISBN 9780810864405.
