= Mejë =

Mejë: Mejë (Albanian); Меја/Meja (Serbian)
- Village
- Location within Kosovo
- Coordinates: 42.374537°N 20.400053°E
- Location: Kosovo
- District: Gjakovë
- Municipality: Gjakovë

Population (2024)
  - Total: 285
- Time zone: UTC+1 (Central European Time)
  - Summer (DST): UTC+2 (CEST)

Mejë (Serbian: Meja) is one of the largest villages in the District of Gjakova, Kosovo. The village is composed entirely of Catholic Christian Albanians. The Albanians speak the Gheg dialect of the Albanian language.

== History ==
The village was mentioned in the Ottoman defter of 1485 with 28 households, and the defter indicates it was inhabited by Catholic Christian Albanians and the names of the inhabitants were overwhelmingly Albanian: 'Marin, Leka, Gjin, Tanush, Nika, Duka, Ukca, Gega, Gjon'.

== Meja massacre ==
Mejë was the site where the Meja massacre took place on 27 April 1999 during the Kosovo War, a mass execution of 372 Kosovo Albanian civilians committed by Serbian police and Yugoslav Army forces as an act of retaliation for the killing of six Serbian policemen by the Kosovo Liberation Army (KLA). The men were pulled from refugee convoys at a checkpoint in Meja and their families were ordered to proceed to Albania. Men and boys were separated and then executed by the road. The massacre is considered to have been the largest of the war.
