= Morinë, Gjakova =

Morinë: Morinë (Albanian)
- Village
- Location within Kosovo
- Coordinates: 42.40808878115828°N 20.263434211492054°E
- Location: Kosovo
- District: Gjakova
- Municipality: Gjakova

Population (2024)
  - Total: 151
- Time zone: UTC+1 (CET)
  - Summer (DST): UTC+2 (CEST)

Morinë is a village in the District of Gjakova, in Kosovo. Morinë is situated nearby to the hamlets Ukshini and Potok and the village Ponoshec. Morinë is located east of the mountain pass of Qafë Morinë.

== Etymology ==
The name of the settlement comes from the Morina tribe.

== History ==
The Morina during the 15th century were part of the Nahiya of Altun-ili and Morina as a settlement was mentioned in the 1485 Ottoman defter of the region. In total there were registered 28 homes.

In 1913, the village was completely burnt down by Serbo-Montenegrin forced together with Skivjan, Ponoshec, and Novosella as an act of retribution for the killing of 2 Serbian soldiers.
