= Dushkaja =

Ethnographic region in the Dukagjini Plains of western Kosovo

Dushkaja Dushkajë
- Geographic region in Kosovo
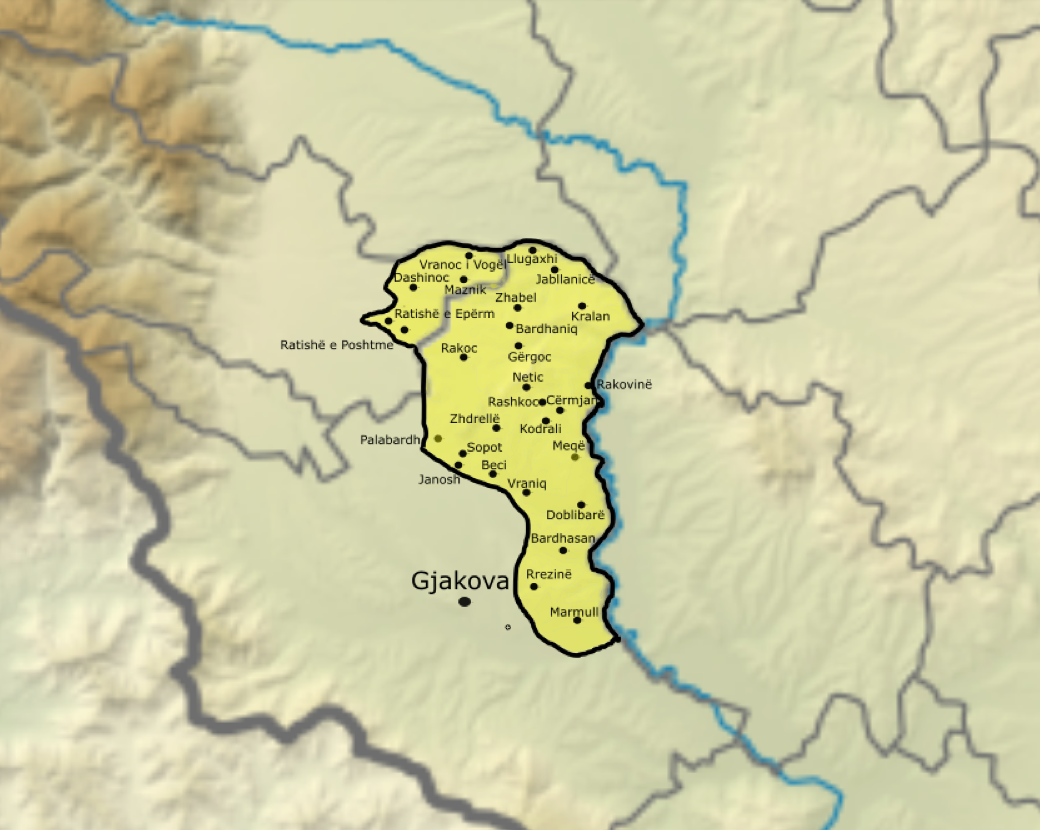
- The Dushkaja region and its settlements.
- Country: Kosovo
- District: District of Gjakova
- Municipality: Gjakova and Deçan

Dushkaja or Dushkajë is an ethnographic region in the Dukagjini Plains of western Kosovo. Much of the region corresponds to the District of Gjakova.

== Etymology ==
Dushkaja's etymology derives from the Albanian word dushk (which in itself is derived from the Proto-Albanian language), meaning 'oak', as the region is covered with many oak forests.

== Geography ==
Dushkaja lies in the central part of the Dukagjini Plains and consists of 26 villages administered by two municipal centers - Gjakova and Deçan. Dushkaja is characterized by a large number of hills, valleys and plains that are covered with small and large oak forests. Most settlements in the region utilise Gjakova as their urban centre, save for Dashinoc, Maznik, Ratishë e Epërm, Ratishë e Poshtme and Vranoci i Vogël, which utilise Deçan as their cultural centre. Dushkaja is bordered by the White Drin to the east, Deçan's Lumbardh to the north (which separates from the ethnographic Baran Valley region), the lower course of the Erenik river to the south and the province of Reka to the west, which in itself extends to the Highlands of Gjakova.

== History ==
According to local tradition and corroborated by medieval sources, a large number of the villages in Dushkaja are very old. Slavic and Ottoman administrative sources, namely the Chrysobull of Deçan (1330) and the Registry of the Sandzak of Shkodra (1485), as well as some old maps, make mention of said villages. The Chrysobull of Deçan mentions Jablanica, Ratishë, Rakoc, Rashkoc, Zhdrellë, Meqe, Sapot, Cërmjan, Rakovina, Kralan, Bec and Radoniq, while the Ottoman record mentions Palabardh, Janosh, Vraniq, Kralan, Cërm Bec, Rashkoc, Radoniq, Rakoc and Rakovina.

== Anthropology ==
The population of Dushkaja has traditionally lived on agriculture and livestock and continues to do so today, but in last 3-4 decades, an increasing importance has been given to education, employment, emancipation and the overall transformation of the region's villages. Albanians are native to the region and are the dominantly-vast majority of Dushkaja's inhabitants, but there have also been Serbian and Montenegrin colonists, nomadic Romani, and according to traces in toponomy in one part of Dushkaja, some Circassians that had been settled in the region but have since left. Nonetheless, most settlements in Dushkaja have historically been inhabited almost exclusively by Albanians.

== Settlements ==
The following settlements are located in the Dushkaja region:

- Bardhaniq
- Beci
- Bardhasan
- Cërmjan
- Dashinoc
- Doblibarë
- Gërgoc
- Jabllanicë
- Janosh
- Kodrali
- Kralan
- Llugaxhi
- Marmull
- Maznik
- Meqë
- Netic
- Palabardhë
- Qerim
- Rakovinë
- Rashkoc
- Ratishë e Epërm
- Ratishë e Poshtme
- Rrezinë
- Sopot
- Vraniq
- Vranoc i Vogël
- Zhabel
- Zhdrellë

== Trivia ==
The football club KF Dushkaja is named after the region.
