= Moglik =

Moglik: Moglik (Albanian) Moglica (Serbian)
- Village
- Location within Kosovo
- Coordinates: 42°20′54″N 20°26′24″E
- Country: Kosovo
- District: Gjakova
- Municipality: Gjakova
- Elevation: 392 m (1,286 ft)

Population (2024)
  - Total: 339
- Time zone: UTC+1 (Central European Time)
  - Summer (DST): UTC+2 (CEST)

Moglik is a village in the Hasi region of the Gjakova municipality in Kosovo. It is inhabited entirely by Albanians.

== History ==
Moglik has been the location of several Bronze Age and Iron Age mounds discovered by the Archaeological Institute and the Museum of Kosovo in 2001. Moglik had different phases of settlement throughout its existence - it was initially located on plains, then relocated onto a hill, and then again on the plains. At the foot of the surrounding mountains, materials such as tiles, stones and bricks have been found. It is first mentioned in the cadastral records of the Sanjak of Dukagjini of 1571 with the name Mogolec, and had 19 houses, 15 bachelors and 5 couples. The register of the Sanjak of Prizren in 1574, the village had 32 houses. In the cadastral records of the Sanjak of Prizren in 1591, with the same name Mogolec, the village had 28 houses, 6 bachelors and 5 couples. On an Austrian map of 1689, it is recorded with the name Moglina. In the ecclesiastical documents of the Church of Zym, which were preserved from 1842 onwards, the settlement is registered. Additionally, the records of the Vilayet of Kosovo of 1893, 1896 and 1900 record the village under the name Muglica. The toponomy of Moglik is of predominant Albanian origin.

== Anthropology ==
The families in the village include the Markprekaj, Dedaj, Nikollaj, Milici, Përlalaj, Ndreaj, Shuti, Allakaj, Zefaj etc.

== Archaeology ==
=== Saint John the Baptist Church ===
Moglik is home to the Saint John the Baptist Church built in 1974. It was built during the time of Friar Hil Kabashi and is of dimensions 5.5 x 7.5 meters. Its feast day is August 29th.
