= Mazreku =

Mazreku (archaic forms: Masarecu, Masareccu, Meserechus, Mânzaraku, Mazaraki or Mazarek) is an Albanian tribe or fis from the Dukagjin highlands. Historically they were one of the most widespread tribes, and placenames related to them are found throughout Albania: examples include Mazrek of Shkodër, Mazrek in Tiranë, Mazrek in Prizren and Mazarać in Vladičin Han.

The name Mazrek(u), which means "horse breeder" in Albanian, is found throughout all Albanian regions. Furthermore, the name relates to the Albanian word mëz - maz ('foal'), deriving from the Proto-Albanian *mandja and cognates to the Messapic word *menza ('foal').

Another Albanian tribe called the Mazreku lived in Epirus during the Middle Ages.

As a surname it may refer to:

- Mazarek (vojvoda), Albanian nobleman and general in Serbia in the 15th century
- Pjetër Mazreku, Albanian prelate of the Roman Catholic Church in the 17th century
- Matija Mazarek, priest in the Ottoman Empire in the 18th century
- Blerim Mazreku (born 1981), Kosovan basketball player
- Gafur Mazreku, Albanian politician, late 20th century
- Pjetër Mazreku (fl. 1624–1642), Roman Catholic bishop
- Luan and Bekim Mazreku, Kosovan soldiers in 1998
- Kostandin Kastrioti Mazreku, Great-grandfather of the Albanian national hero, Skanderbeg.

== See also ==
- Shala (tribe)
- Shoshi (tribe)
- Shllaku (tribe)
- Dushmani (tribe)
- Toplana (tribe)
