= Church ruins, Mazrek =

Church in Albania

Church ruins
- Rrënojat e Kishës së Shatit (Albanian)
- Location: Mazrek

Cultural Monument of Albania

The Church ruins (Albanian: Rrënojat e Kishës së Shatit) in Mazrek, Shkodër County, Albania, are a Cultural Monument of Albania.
