= Bardhaniq =

Bardhaniq: Bardhaniq (Albanian)
- Village
- Location within Kosovo
- Coordinates: 42.531°N 20.453°E
- Location: Kosovo
- District: Gjakova
- Municipality: Gjakova

Population (2024)
  - Total: 248
- Time zone: UTC+1 (CET)
  - Summer (DST): UTC+2 (CEST)

Bardhaniq is a village in District of Gjakova, Kosovo. Bardhaniq is situated nearby to the villages Zhabel and Gërgoc.

== Etymology ==
Some linguists consider the name of the settlement as a development from proto-Albanian word bard (Albanian: bardhe), meaning white.
