= Morina (tribe) =

Region in Gjakova highlands, historic Albanian tribe

Morina tribe (Albanian: fisi Morinë or fisi Marin) is a small tribe and historical region of the Highlands of Gjakova in Albania and Kosovo. The border post between Albania and Kosovo called Qafë Morinë (Morina Pass) lies on Morina territory, however the Morina have settled various parts of Kosovo, in particular Gjakova, Dardana and Gjilan.

== Etymology ==
According to an article by Nikoll Kimza in 1937, published in the Hylli i Dritës, called "Hetime mí vjetersín e rrjedhen e Derës Gjomarkaj e të Mirditës", the Morina tribe was also called Marin which leads to believe that the name comes from the same Albanian first name "Marin (name)" of Latin origin meaning "marine; of or pertaining to the sea".

== Geography ==
Morina tribal territory bordered the traditional tribal lands of Gashi (tribe) to the west, Bytyçi to the southwest and Has (municipality) to the south. There are two villages named Morina on the Kosovo-Albanian border.

== History ==
=== Origins ===
The Morinas were a tribe in the sense of a fis, i.e. a community that is aware of common blood ties and of common history reaching back to one male ancestor. According to oral tradition, they seem to trace a common origin with the Mirdita tribe. The Mirditans, Shala (tribe) and Shoshi (region) trace their origin to the Pashtrik mountain on the Kosovo-Albanian border, not far from Morina territory which leads to assume that while the Mirditans left their original home, the smaller Morinas stayed closer.

=== Middle Ages ===
During the 15th century Morinë, Gjakova is mentioned as a village. All of Morina's inhabitants had Albanian anthroponomy, indicating that Christian Albanians inhabited the village and its surroundings.

=== Balkan war ===
During the battle of Lumë in 1912, among the first battles on the border of Luma (region) took place in the Albanian village of Morinë.

=== Kosovo war ===
During the Kosovo War, several tens of thousands of Albanian refugees crossed the border in Morinë every day. At the time, Morinë was the only border crossing between Kosovo and Albania. On 13 June 1999, Bundeswehr troops crossed the border near Morinë from Albania after NATO and Yugoslavia agreed on a withdrawal of Serbian troops from Kosovo. Furthermore, the Kosovar village of Morina, near Gjakova was a stronghold for local Kosovo Liberation Army soldiers and multiple battles were fought there.

=== Religion ===
The Morinas were originally Catholic before mostly converting to Islam in the later Ottoman Empire period due to social and economic reasons. In light of their connection to the Mirditans there is also evidence for influence by Orthodoxy in earlier times.

== Notable people ==
- Fitim Morina, Icelandic footballer
- Geldona Morina, Kosovar footballer
- Mario Morina, Albanian footballer

== See also ==
- Tribes of Albania
