= Vogovë =

- Village
- Location within Kosovo
- Coordinates: 42.349°N 20.392°E
- Location: Kosovo
- District: Gjakova
- Municipality: Gjakova

Population (2024)
  - Total: 296
- Time zone: UTC+1 (Central European Time)
  - Summer (DST): UTC+2 (CEST)

Vogovë is a village in the District of Gjakova, in Kosovo. Vogovë is situated nearby to the village Zhub and Rrasa e Gjoni. The village of Vogovë is situated within the Has region.

== History ==
Vogovë was mentioned in the Ottoman defter of 1485 and the year 1571 with 18 households. The Ottoman defters from the 15th and 16th century indicate that Vogovë was inhabited by a largely Christian Albanian population given the Albanian anthroponomy present: Koka Doda, Prend Tola, Pejo Kola, Gjec Pejo, Papa Deda, Deja Biba, Nina Boga, Gjin Boga, Prend Mica, Andre Doda, Tola Koka, Deja Baci, Deja Pejo, Deda Papa, Pejo Biba, Shtefan Nina, Biba Gjini, Tola Noja, Gjon Koka, Tola Deja, Tola Andrea, Doda Andrea, Gika Biba, Gjon Nina, Mica Mika, Doda Koja.
