= Raçë =

Village in Gjakova, Kosovo

Raçë/Raça
- Village
- Location within Kosovo
- Coordinates: 42.35533842536842°N 20.457722925297297°E
- Location: Kosovo
- District: Gjakova
- Municipality: Gjakova

Population (2024)
  - Total: 286
- Time zone: UTC+1 (CET)
  - Summer (DST): UTC+2 (CEST)

Raçë is a village in District of Gjakova. Raça is situated near the villages Moglica and Pjetërshan.

== Background ==
In the Ottoman defter of 1571, there were two villages mentioned in the region with the name Raça, Dolina Raça and Gorna Raça. The villages had 60 homes and the names of the inhabitants were Albanian.
