= KF Dushkaja =

Football club in Kosovo

- Full name: Klub Futbollistik Dushkaja
- Founded: 2000; 25 years ago
- Ground: Dushkaja Sports Field
- Capacity: 500

KF Dushkaja (Albanian: Klubi Futbollistik Dushkaja) is a professional football club from Kosovo which competes in the Second League. The club is based in Gjakovë. Their home ground is the Dushkaja Sports Field which has a viewing capacity of 500. They are named after the Dushkaja region.
