= Meja massacre =

1999 mass execution in Meja, Kosovo

Coordinates: 42.5300°N 20.2400°E

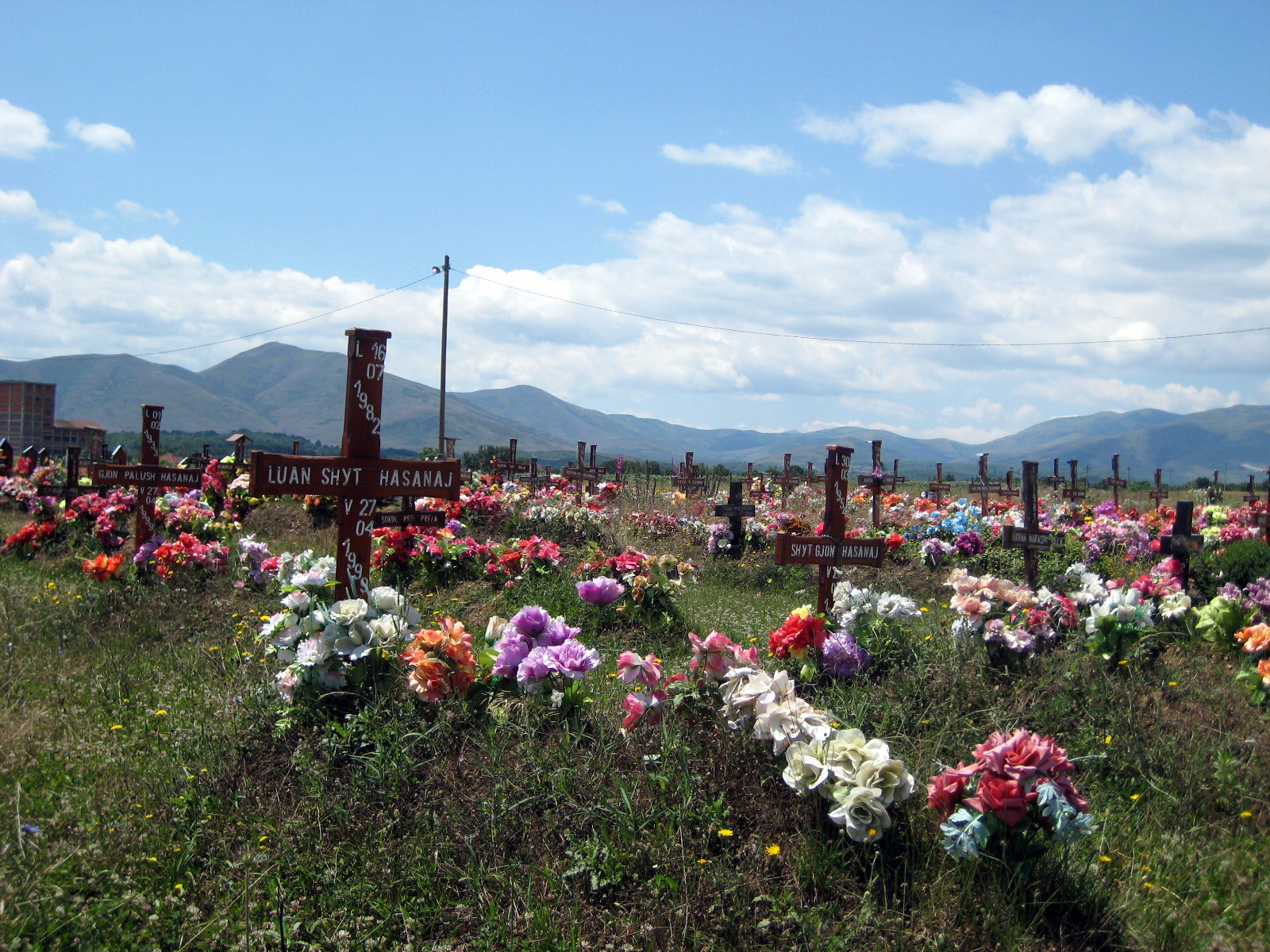
- Graves at massacre site after reburial
- Location: Meja, Oriza, and other villages in Reka e Keqe, near Djakovica, FR Yugoslavia (modern Kosovo)
- Date: 27–28 April 1999
- Target: Kosovo Albanian males between the ages of 14 and 60
- Attack type: Mass murder, gendercide (androcide), ethnic cleansing
- Deaths: 377 to nearly 500
- Perpetrators: Yugoslav security forces and Serbian police
- Motive: Anti-Albanian sentiment

The Meja massacre (Albanian: Masakra e Mejës) was the mass execution of at least 377 Albanian Catholic and Muslim civilians during the Kosovo War with the purpose of ethnic cleansing, which took place on 27 April 1999. The majority of the victims were from neighbouring areas around Meja and were temporarily in Meja as refugees who wanted to cross into Albania but were stopped there by the Serbian military. It was committed by Serbian police and army forces in Operation Reka which began after the killing of six Serbian policemen by the Kosovo Liberation Army (KLA) in the Meja ambush.

The executions occurred in the village of Meja near the town of Gjakova. The victims were pulled from refugee convoys at a checkpoint in Meja and their families were ordered to proceed to Albania. Men and boys were separated and then executed by the road. It is one of the largest massacres in the Kosovo War. Many of the bodies of the victims were found in the Batajnica mass graves. The International Criminal Tribunal for the former Yugoslavia has convicted several Serbian army and police officers for their involvement.

== Background ==
Meja is a small, predominantly Catholic, village in Kosovo, located a few kilometers northwest of the town of Gjakova. On 21 April, a week before the massacre, the Kosovo Liberation Army (KLA) ambushed a Serb police vehicle near the centre of Meja, killing five policemen and one officer. One villager from Meja told Human Rights Watch researchers: "The five policemen were killed in one car, a brown Opel Ascona. They came to us a few minutes before they were killed, asking, “where is the KLA?” They left and then we heard the bazooka." One of the officers killed was police commander Milutin Prašević, the leader of a unit that, according to witness testimony, carried out the ethnic cleansing of Albanians in the area. The attack on Prašević is listed by Human Rights Watch as a probable motive for the mass shootings that followed.

== Expulsions ==
On the morning of 27 April, Yugoslav government forces attacked the village of Meja without warning, shelling and burning homes. Serbian police units rounded up the village residents near the school. Between 100 and 150 men aged fifteen to fifty were separated from the crowd of villagers. The men were later further divided into groups of twenty and shot with machine-guns, and then additionally shot in the head. At the same time, early in the morning of 27 April, special police, along with the Yugoslav Army, expelled Kosovo Albanians from the Reka e Keqe region between Gjakova and Junik, near the border with Albania. Starting at 06:00, security forces expelled residents of the villages of Pacaj, Nivokaz, Dobrosh, Sheremet, Jahoc, Ponoshec, Racaj, Ramoc and Madanaj, as well as residents of the Gjakova neighborhood of Orize. Government forces surrounded the villages, gathered residents and drove them on the road through Gjakova, some riding on tractor trailers, some on foot. Many villages were systematically burned. According to testimony, flamethrowers were also used during house burnings.

A nineteen-year-old girl originally from Orize, whose father was kidnapped the next day in Meja, told Human Rights Watch researchers:

An order to leave came at 5:00 a.m. The police came to the door. They knocked and said, “get out of your house because we’re going to burn it.” I had to leave immediately with my mother, father, and fifteen-year-old brother.

Locals from across the area were forced to go towards Meja. Serbian policemen set up a checkpoint in Meja at which they waited for refugees from the surrounding villages. Many police officers wore "phantom" black masks. At the checkpoint, policemen and soldiers plundered the expelled villagers. Many refugees were beaten by police and threatened with death if they do not hand money and valuables. A 36-year-old woman stated:

When we arrived in Meja, the Serbs stopped us; they wanted money and jewelry. They threatened my children, even my baby. They had beards, and wore masks. They took our necklaces, rings, earrings, identity papers, even our bags with clothing. They took everything. They threw our clothes in the bushes. They spoke to us harshly, and slapped one woman.

Following the raids, security forces separated men from the columns. A nineteen-year-old man who had arrived in Meja between 10:00 and 11:00 local time stated:

They [the police and military] stopped the tractors and began to hit people with pieces of wood and they broke the tractor windows. The men were stopped and taken away, about one hundred men, to a field near the road. The police screamed for us to keep moving so we left the hundred men and we don’t know what happened to them.

Refugees who travelled through Meja that day confirmed that police officers seized men aged fourteen to sixty from their convoys. One woman said that her husband was removed from his trailer and joined a group of Albanians who were standing beside the road, where they were made to shout, "Long live Serbia! Long live Milošević!" Another witness saw his 42-year-old father being pulled from a car and held with a group of around 300 other men, who were then separated from the convoys and beaten in a drainage ditch.

Refugees who passed through Meja between noon and 15:00 reported that they saw a number of men who had been arrested by the police, even hundreds. One witness (38), a teacher who passed through Meja at 23:00, told Human Rights Watch researchers:

I saw a big crowd of people separated from their families: old and young men. I think it was more than 250. They were kneeling on the ground . . .along the road at a small forest on the side of a hill about twenty or thirty meters from the road. They were in the village center.

Another witness whom HRW researchers interviewed separately, told a similar story, adding that a group of men was kneeling with their hands behind their backs, surrounded by soldiers.

Human Rights Watch researchers, who in the early morning of 28 April awaited refugees from Kosovo at the Morina border crossing, saw tractors with trailers carrying only women, children and the elderly. Ray Wilkinson, a spokesman for UNHCR in Kukës, who met the refugees at the border, said that on 28 April about sixty tractors had entered Albania, and that six of the seven people said that some men were taken from their vehicles.

== Executions ==
Human Rights Watch researchers learned of the massacre in the early morning of 28 April, when refugees from Kosovo entered Albania through the Morina border crossing. The refugees who arrived during the day reported that they saw men lined up along the road in Meja. The refugees who arrived in the evening, and the next day, claimed to have seen a large number of corpses by the roadside in the village, as did the refugees who had passed through Meja at around noon. An eighteen-year-old girl who had gone through Meja at the time stated that she saw fifteen corpses on the right side of the road:

The road was covered in blood. On the right side there were fifteen men. I counted them. They were lying face down, blood was around, and did not move.

An eighteen-year-old man and nineteen-year-old woman, whom Human Rights Watch researchers interviewed together, said that they walked through Meja at around 18:30 and saw a large pile of bodies three meters from the road in the center of the village, on the right. Bodies, piled in a heap, occupied an area of about 12 by 6 meters, and the pile was about a meter and a half tall. Witnesses said that they were scared and that the police hurried them, which prevented them from carefully counting the bodies but that he estimated that there were around 300. The girl stated:

We saw a lot of blood. We were in shock, traumatized. There were about twenty young men lined up neatly in a row, face down, with their hands tied behind their heads. The Serbs said, “Look what we’ve done to these men, now give us your money.” It was in the center of Meja. The bodies were about four meters away from the road, behind some thorn bushes. I saw some men who had died crouched; other people told us that blood had been taken from them.

On the afternoon of 27 April, when members of the police and the Yugoslav Army stopped the second convoy at the checkpoint near Meja, a witness saw about 200 bodies lying by the road. Members of the police and the Yugoslav Army from this refugee convoy took seven men from Ramoc and ordered the rest of the column to move on. A few minutes later they heard gunshots. Another reported seeing eight fatally wounded men fall into a ditch or canal.

== Victims ==
According to the records of the International Committee of the Red Cross, 282 men were reported to have been kidnapped in Meja, and they were unaccounted for after the war. The exact number of those killed is not known, but it is estimated that the number of men killed was approximately 300, mostly those between the ages of 14 and 60.

After the killings, only a few bodies were recovered. Some of the corpses were picked up by street cleaners. The head of the municipal cleaning company "Çabrati", Faton Polloshka, said that municipal workers had removed about 30 corpses from Meja, although it is believed that many more had died.

Human Rights Watch researchers visited Meja on 15 June after NATO forces entered Kosovo, and saw the remains of several men in a state of decay, burned documents, personal belongings of the victims and empty bullet shells. The corpses were on the edge of a field, near the road that passes through Meja. An intact body and the upper part of the other were on the edge of the valley next to the field, about thirty feet along the way. Two more bodies were located a few meters away in the valley, and the bottom half of the second body in a field near the valley. All the bodies were in an advanced stage of decomposition. Bones of some of the corpses were broken, and it looked as if none of the corpses had the heads. Pieces of a skull were found near one of the bodies. The field had burned documents and personal items - cigarette case, keys, and family photos - which appear to have belonged to the dead. The used bullet shells were scattered around. At the small Catholic cemetery were the buried remains of four men from the village who died in the massacre.

After the fall of Slobodan Milošević, it was revealed that the bodies of Albanian civilians killed in Meja and Suva Reka under the organisation of the Yugoslav Ministry of the Interior were transported by truck to a Serbian Special Anti-Terrorist Unit training centre in Batajnica, near Belgrade, and buried in mass graves.

== Investigation ==
Witnesses interviewed by Human Rights Watch researchers have identified some Serb policemen who were in Meja on 27 April, but did not see any of these officers committing the crime. Three people claimed to have seen on the day of the massacre at a checkpoint Serb policeman called "Stari", for which one of the witnesses thinks that is called Milutin. A resident of the nearby village Koronica said that Stari, whose name is Milutin Novaković, was a policeman on duty in that area. One witness identified another policeman called "Guta," a police commander in the village of Ponoshec, claimed to be in Meja when the crime was committed.

One witness, whose father was taken away to be shot, gave the following description of the perpetrators:

As we were walking through Meja we saw about 300 dead bodies piled up on top of each other in a pasture. It was a big pile of bodies heaped together in a mess, not laid out in any orderly way. The Serbs didn’t let us look at them; they said “fast fast fast.”. . . The bodies in Meja were in a pasture on our left. The pile of bodies was about the size of a tent. Up to four feet high, piled on top of each other. I recognized a couple of men who were alive. There were about fifteen men with their backs to the bodies, facing the Serbs.

The two Serbs were wearing black masks that covered their head and hair; you could only see their eyes and mouth. It was ninja style. They had dark blue police uniforms with loose red stripes on the arm just below the shoulder, I believe on the right arm

Another witness described a similar manner the forces separated the men from Meja:

The Serbs were wearing camouflage uniforms, black masks, black gloves, and carrying automatic weapons. You could only see their mouth and two eyes. They had stripes with the colors of the Serbian flag falling loose. Some had their heads covered; some uncovered. Some had bandanas; I don’t remember the color. Some had short hair; some had long hair. They carried knives in their hands: straight knives bent at the end, about as wide as one’s arm, and two feet long. . . . To look at them was scary. The Serbs weren’t driving military vehicles; they were driving cars stolen in Kosovo.

According to the testimony of Yugoslav Army serviceman Nikë Peraj at the ICTY, the military report that he had seen indicated that "68 terrorists were killed in Meja and 74 in Korenica". He points out that "terrorist" was used as a term for the Albanian population, that he saw the bodies himself and that none of them were military.

During post-war investigations in Serbia, at least 287 bodies of people who had at the time disappeared from Meja and surrounding areas were discovered in mass graves in Batajnica, near Belgrade. On 1 August 2003, the remains of 43 were returned and buried in Meja. Bodies of 21 other Albanians whose bodies were returned to Kosovo were buried in Meja on 26 August 2005. As of March 2008, the remains of 345 massacre victims have been identified and returned to Kosovo and 32 remain missing. According to Genocide Watch and Balkan Insight, at least 377 Albanians were killed in the massacres.

== Criminal charges ==
EULEX began its investigation on the massacre in 2013. At the time it released criminal charges on 17 Serbs from Gjakova for the massacre. Another suspect, Marjan Abazi, an Albanian collaborator of the Serbian Police from Ramoc, was arrested in Montenegro and then committed suicide August 2014 while in prison in Peja. In 2014, the ICTY convicted five Serb army and police generals for their role in the Meja massacre among other war crimes. They are: Sreten Lukić, police colonel general; Dragoljub Ojdanić, army general; Vladimir Lazarević, army colonel general; Nebojša Pavković, army colonel general and Vlastimir Đorđević, police colonel general. Testimonies at the Hague Tribunal have revealed to many other Serbian officers who were involved in the events which led to the Meja massacre, but have never been indicted. Eight of them have appeared as defense witnesses in the trial of Slobodan Milosevic in the ICTY. In December 2023, Kosovo indicted 53 former members of Serbian forces, alleging they participated in the massacre.

== See also ==
- List of massacres in Kosovo War
