= Cërmjan =

- Village
- Location in Kosovo
- Coordinates: 42°28′21″N 20°28′35″E
- Location: Kosovo
- District: Gjakova
- Municipality: Gjakova
- Elevation: 500 m (1,600 ft)

Population (2024)
  - Total: 871
- Time zone: UTC+1 (CET)
  - Summer (DST): UTC+2 (CEST)

Cërmjan (definite Albanian: Cërmjani) is a village in the Gjakova municipality of Kosovo. It is located in the Dushkajë subregion of Dukagjin and has 871 inhabitants as of 2024. Suka e Cërmjanit, a location in the northern part of the region is the site of fortification walls of a settlement of late antiquity in a total surface area of ca. 1.3 ha.

== References and Notes ==
=== Sources ===
- Berisha, Milot (2012). "Archaeological Guide of Kosovo" (PDF). Ministry of Culture of Kosovo.
