= Sarosh, Rahovec =

Sarosh Sarosh
- Village
- Location within Kosovo
- Coordinates: 42.45296074131789°N 20.534040033772786°E
- Country: Kosovo
- District: Gjakova
- Time zone: UTC+1 (Central European Time)
  - Summer (DST): UTC+2 (CEST)

Sarosh is a village in the municipality of Rahovec, district of Gjakova, in Kosovo. Sarosh is situated nearby to the villages Dabidol and Qifllak.

== History ==
The name of the village is by some considered to be Albanian or of non-Slavic origin.

The village was mentioned in the Ottoman defter of 1591 with 36 households. The Ottoman defter of the 16th century indicates that Sarosh was inhabited by an Albanian population; the names of the inhabitants were mainly Albanian: Gika Koja, Gac Koka, Pepa Gjoni, Biba Lika, Gjin Prendi, Prend Kola, Gjon Vuka, Pal Gjoni, Pal Koka, Deda Vladi, Prend Lika, Papa Pali, Pepa Bic, Prend Duja, Gika Gjoni, Deja Prendi, Bic Kola, Pepa Prendi, Kola Papa, Gac Stepa.

In the area of Sarosh, in a place called Ara e Vade, a fragment of a Neolithic ax, a spherical press and some fragments of prehistoric vessels were found.
