= Guskë, Gjakova =

Guskë
- Village
- Location within Kosovo
- Coordinates: 42.363671395719905°N 20.372015185433124°E
- Country: Kosovo
- District: Gjakova
- Municipality: Gjakova

Population (2011)
  - Total: 136
- Time zone: UTC+1 (Central European Time)
  - Summer (DST): UTC+2 (CEST)

Guskë is a village in District of Gjakova, Kosovo. Guskë is situated nearby to the village Korenice and the hamlet Rrasa e Gjoni. The village is part of the Has region.

== History ==
The village was mentioned in the Ottoman defter of 1571 as 'Guska' with 15 households

The Ottoman defter of 1571 indicates that Guske was inhabited by an Albanian population during the 16th century, the inhabitants names were mainly Albanian: " Andre Nina, Gac Papa, Papa Koka, Noja Nina, Bac Tola, Koka Vasa, Koka Nue, Kola Andrea, Pal Gaci, Tola Gjini, Koka Doci, Lika Noja, Nina Llapa, Nue Koka, Nina Marku, Gjon Koka, Andre Peca, Gjin Doci, Koka Baci, Nue Koka ".
