= Terzi Bridge =

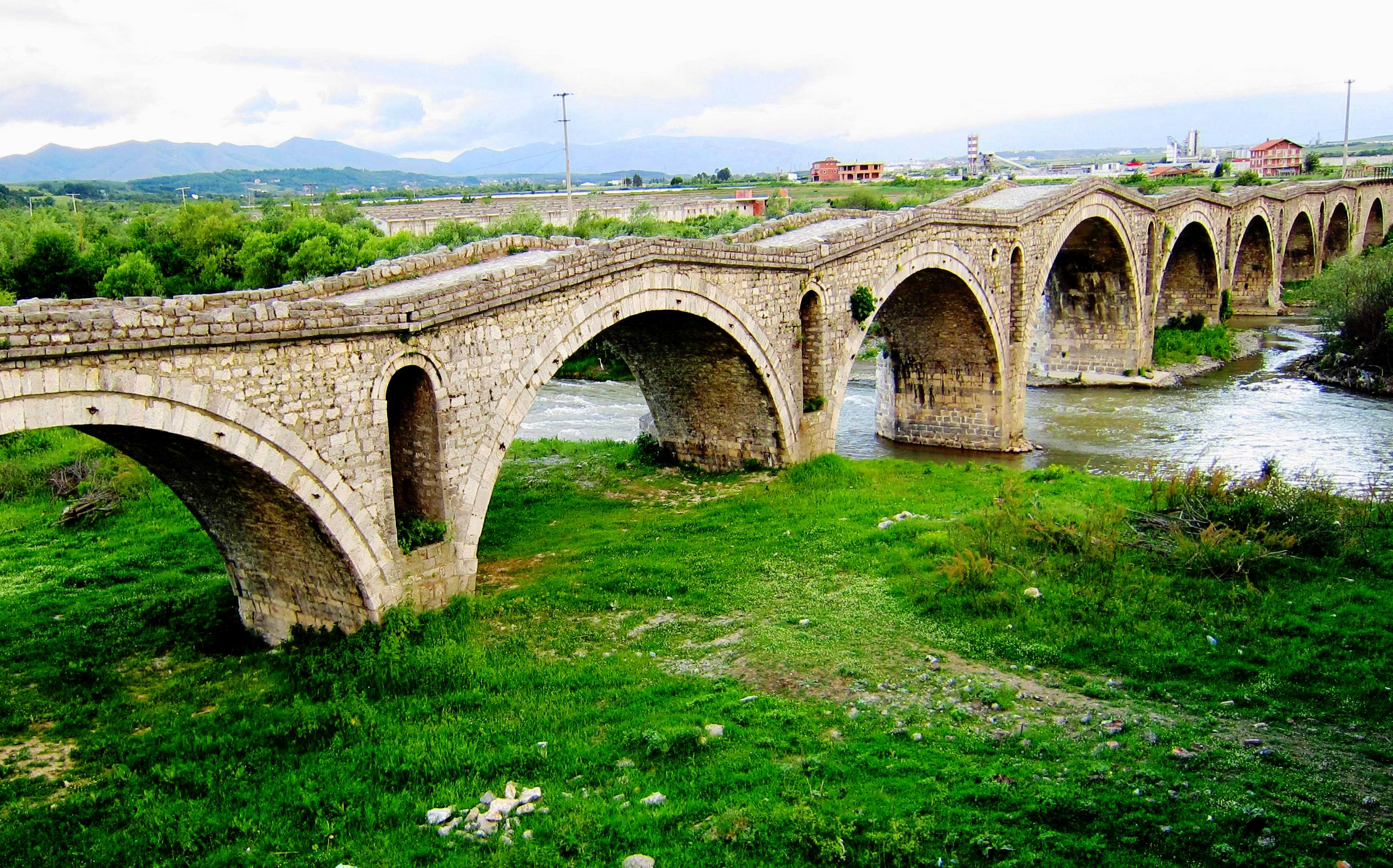
- Terzi bridge over the Erenik river
- Coordinates: 42°21′34″N 20°30′33″E
- Carries: One (pedestrian) lane
- Crosses: Erenik
- Locale: Bishtazhin, near Gjakova
- Heritage status: Monument of Culture of Exceptional Importance

Characteristics
- Design: Multi-arch
- Total length: 190 m (620 ft)
- Width: 3.5 m (11 ft)

History
- Opened: 15th century

Terzi Bridge or Terzijski Bridge (Albanian: Ura e Terzive, Serbian: Терзијски мост / Terzijski most, Turkish: Terzi Köprüsü), also referred to as Tailors' Bridge, is located near the village of Bishtazhin, near Gjakova, Kosovo. It is a respectable example of Ottoman architecture in Kosovo. It was built over the Erenik river, probably at the end of the 15th century, and was altered in the 18th century. It is a noteworthy example of the Tailors' guild from Gjakova, from which it received its name. Major reconstruction and restoration to its original appearance occurred from 1982 to 1984. Today, the bridge is under the protection of the Republic of Kosovo, originally being declared a Monument of Culture of Exceptional Importance in 1990 within Serbia.

== History ==
It is not known when exactly the bridge was built, but it is thought to have been at the end of the 15th century. This is due to the bridge having been erected on a medieval route, which connected Gjakova with Prizren, and that the bridge was later expanded (a result of changes of flow in the river). In the 18th century it experienced major modifications, which gave it its current appearance. These works were financed by the Terzijski guild from Gjakova, confirmed by an inscription carved in Turkish.

The bridge was built with trimmed stones, in dark gray and an ocher shade. Its length exceeds 190 metres (620 feet), the width of the pavement originally measuring over 3.5 meters. The bridge consists of 11 rounded arches, among which are embedded niches.

== See also ==
- Gjakova
- Monument of Culture of Exceptional Importance
