= Ujz, Gjakova =

Village in Gjakova, Kosovo

Ujz: Ujz (Albanian); Радотићи/Radotica (Serbian)
- Village
- Location in Kosovo
- Coordinates: 42.33967901502142°N 20.539730111892812°E
- Location: Kosovo
- District: Gjakova
- Municipality: Gjakova

Population (2024)
  - Total: 325
- Time zone: UTC+1 (CET)
  - Summer (DST): UTC+2 (CEST)

Ujz (Serbian: Radotica) is a village in the district of Gjakova, Kosovo. Ujz is situated near the villages Fshaj and Pnish, within the Has region.

== History ==
The village Ujz was mentioned in the Ottoman defter of 1571 with 36 households. The inhabitants of Ujz bore majority Albanian names.
