= Plançor =

- Village
- Location within Kosovo
- Coordinates: 42.448334856173375°N 20.363395157230052°E
- Country: Kosovo
- District: Gjakova
- Municipality: Gjakova

Population (2024)
  - Total: 401
- Time zone: UTC+1 (Central European Time)
  - Summer (DST): UTC+2 (CEST)

Plançor is a village in District of Gjakova, Kosovo. Plançor is situated nearby to the villages Dujakë and Hereç.

== History ==
In the area of Plançor, a village with the name Plaqani (Plakani) is mentioned in the Ottoman defters of 1485, the village had 14 homes. Over half of the inhabitants bore Albanian names, indicating the village was inhabited by Albanians.
