= Bardhasan =

Bardhasan: Bardhasan (Albanian)
- Village
- Location within Kosovo
- Coordinates: 42°24′15″N 20°30′17″E
- Country: Kosovo
- District: Gjakova
- Municipality: Gjakova
- Elevation: 322 m (1,056 ft)

Population (2024)
  - Total: 215
- Time zone: UTC+1 (Central European Time)
  - Summer (DST): UTC+2 (CEST)

Bardhasan is a village in the Dushkaja subregion of the Gjakova municipality of Kosovo. It is inhabited exclusively by Albanians.

== Etymology ==
Bardhasan is considered to derive from a patronym rooted in the Albanian word Bardhë (meaning "white").

== Geography ==
Bardhasan is situated on the right bank of the White Drin in the Dushkaja subregion. It is located around 10 km east of the city of Gjakova. It is bordered by Doblibare to the north and Marmulli to the south. Its total area consists of around 1.051 ha.

== History ==
Bardhasan's 19th century Catholic church of Shën Bumi is a protected monument of cultural heritage in Kosovo.

The toponymy of Bardhosan is dominated by Albanian toponyms, but there is also an element of foreign languages. The majority of the village's toponyms are early names related to agriculture and livestock, which have historically been the main activities that the local population sustains itself on. The toponomy of Bardhosan – such as Arat e Trollit (Trolli's Fields), Kodra e Thatë (Dry Hill), Kodra e Sarajit (Saraj's Hill), Livadhi i Sarajit (Saraj's Meadow), Livadhet e Bubit (Bubi's Meadows), Livadhet e Bunarit (Meadows of the Waterwell), Livadhet e Egra (Wild Meadows), Vorret e Kqija (Bad Graves), Lugu i Pashës (Pasha's Groove), Mahalla e Begit (Beg's Neighbourhood), Prroni i Qiqrit (Qiqri's Prroni) – indicate the dominance of Albanian toponomy.

== Anthropology ==
Bardhasan is inhabited by the following families: the Berishë, Domgjon, Krasniq, Gjugje, Kuzhnin, Mirditë, and Bisak families.
