= Vranići =

Vranići may refer to:

- Vranići, Serbia, a village near Čačak
- Vranići, Bosnia and Herzegovina, a village near Goražde
- Vranići, Podgorica, a suburb in Montenegro

== See also ==
- Vranić (disambiguation)
