= Qerim =

- Village
- Location within Kosovo
- Coordinates: 42°24′11″N 20°26′9″E
- Country: Kosovo
- District: District of Gjakova
- Municipality: Gjakova
- Elevation: 390 m (1,280 ft)

Population (2024)
  - Total: 802
- Time zone: UTC+1 (Central European Time)
  - Summer (DST): UTC+2 (CEST)

Qerim is a village in the District of Gjakova, Kosovo.
