= Smaq, Gjakova =

Village in Gjakova, Kosovo

Smaq
- Village
- Location within Kosovo
- Coordinates: 42.33370232299749°N 20.514391147886816°E
- Location: Kosovo
- District: Gjakova
- Municipality: Gjakova

Population (2011)
  - Total: 435
- Time zone: UTC+1 (CET)
  - Summer (DST): UTC+2 (CEST)

Smaq is a village in District of Gjakova, Kosovo. Smaq is situated nearby to the villages Kushavec and Bishtazhin.

== Background ==
Smaq is mentioned as a village in the Ottoman defter of 1571 with 34 households. The names of the inhabitants were Albanian, indicating the village and the surrounding area was historically inhabited by an Albanian population.
