= Lipovec (Gjakova) =

Village in Gjakova, Kosovo

- Village
- Location within Kosovo
- Coordinates: 42.311550782011615°N 20.477271267145397°E
- Location: Kosovo
- District: Gjakova
- Municipality: Gjakova

Population (2024)
  - Total: 694
- Time zone: UTC+1 (CET)
  - Summer (DST): UTC+2 (CEST)

Lipovec is a village in the District of Gjakova, within the region of Has.

== History ==
Lipovec was possibly mentioned as a village in the Ottoman defter of 1485 as Lepovac and had 35 homes. The inhabitants of Lepovac bore Albanian anthroponyms.
