= Gafur Mazreku =

Albanian politician

Gafur Mazrreku was a member of Socialist Party of Albania. He was a deputy in parliament. He was sentenced to 11 years after he shot Azem Hajdari in parliament. The altercation took place two days after the men had an altercation in a dispute over value-added tax legislation. He was released after five years under an amnesty granted by Prime Minister Fatos Nano. Gafur and his family belong to the Mazreku tribe.
