= Jahoc =

Village in Kosovo

- Village
- Location within Kosovo
- Coordinates: 42°23′25″N 20°23′40″E
- Country: Kosovo
- District: Gjakova
- Municipality: Gjakova

Population (2024)
  - Total: 205
- Time zone: UTC+1 (CET)
  - Summer (DST): UTC+2 (CEST)

Jahoc (Serbian Cyrillic: Јахоц) is a populated place in Gjakova Municipality in the District of Gjakova in Kosovo. The population was 87 in 1948, 615 in 1991, 553 in 2011 and 205 in 2024.

The village contains a listed Monument of Kosovo, the Roman Archaeological Site and Medieval Church in Jahoc (reference number 3657). In 2003 and 2004, the Instituti Arkeologjik i Kosovës performed excavations at the Roman site and found a Roman settlement dating to the 1st century BC, a necropolis and various coins and fragments from the 1st to 3rd century AD.

== Sources ==
- Flynn, Randall E.; Quinting, Gerd. (1983). Gazetteer of Yugoslavia : names approved by the United States Board on Geographic Names. Washington, D.C.: Defense Mapping Agency.
- Valla, Arian (January 1, 2022). "Lokaliteti arkeologjik i Jahocit - Gjakovë". Kosova Arkeologjike (in Albanian). 3. Instituti Arkeologijk i Kosovës: 217–224.
