= Anton Dedaj =

Croatian kosovan football player

Personal information
- Full name: Anton Dedaj
- Date of birth: 14 April 1980 (age 46)
- Place of birth: Prizren, SR Serbia, SFR Yugoslavia
- Height: 1.76 m (5 ft 9 in)
- Position: Midfielder

Senior career*
Years	Team	Apps	(Gls)
2000–2001	Šibenik	7	(0)
2001–2002	Čakovec	8	(0)
2002	Zadar	5	(0)
2002–2003	Čakovec	0	(0)
2003	Zadar	6	(0)
2003–2004	Koper	11	(0)
2004–2007	Osijek	46	(0)
2007	Örebro SK	1	(0)
2008	Flamurtari Vlorë	0	(0)
2008	Croatia Sesvete	3	(0)
2009	Istra 1961		
2010	Jadran Poreč		
- * Club domestic league appearances and goals as of 23 June 2009 ‡ National team caps and goals as of 23 June 2008

Anton Dedaj (born 14 April 1980) is a Croatian retired football player. The midfielder played for NK Istra 1961 in Croatia. He holds dual Albanian and Croatian citizenship.

== Club career ==
He started his career in Croatia at a young age. He played in the Slovenian first League with FC Koper in 2003–04.
