= Fshaj =

Village in Gjakova, Kosovo

- Village
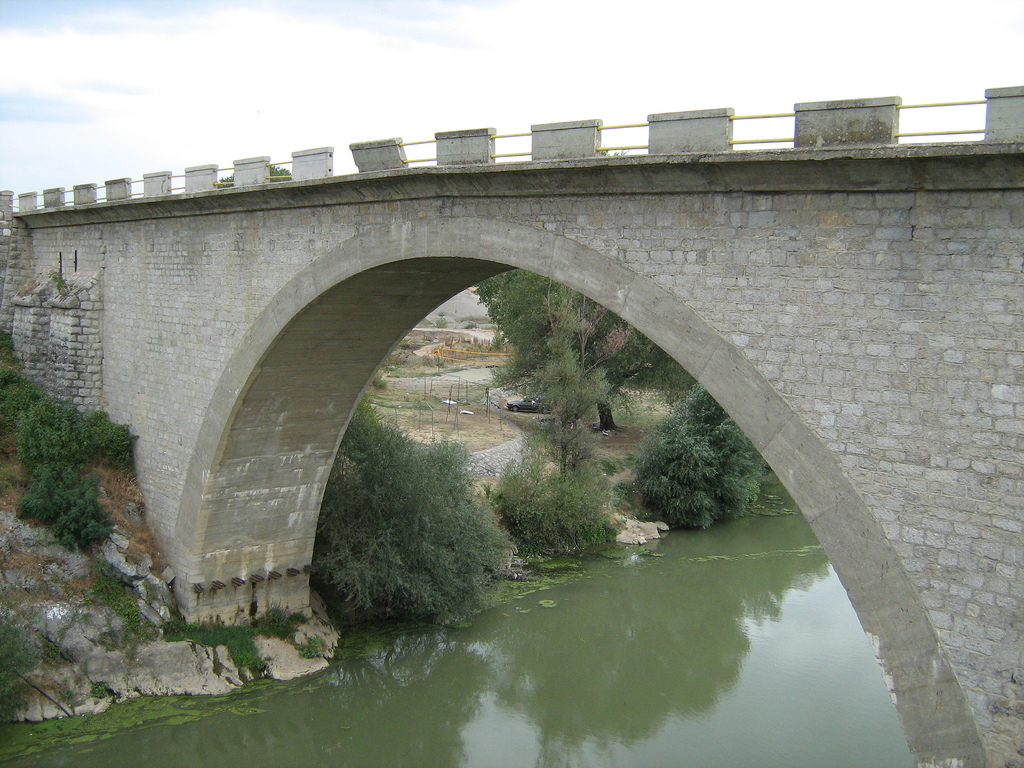
- Fshajt Bridge

- Location within Kosovo
- Coordinates: 42.385°N 20.540°E
- Location: Kosovo
- District: Gjakova
- Municipality: Gjakova

Population (2024)
  - Total: 260
- Time zone: UTC+1 (CET)
  - Summer (DST): UTC+2 (CEST)

Fshaj is a village in the municipality of Gjakova, Kosovo. The village is situated nearby to the villages Ujz and Gexhë.

== Background ==
The name of the village is by Pulaha considered to be an Albanian toponym.

Fshaj is mentioned as a village in the Ottoman register of 1485 by the name of Fshajani/Ifshajani and had 50 households. The village is also mentioned in the Ottoman register of 1571 and had then 19 households. The Ottoman defter indicates that Fshaj was inhabited by an Albanian population, the names of the inhabitants were Albanian.

== Notable people ==
- Anton Quni, politician and KLA commander
