= Mazrek, Prizren =

Village in Prizren, Kosovo

Mazrek: Mazrek (Albanian)
- Village
- Location within Kosovo
- Coordinates: 42°14′06″N 20°37′03″E
- Location: Kosovo
- District: Prizren
- Municipality: Prizren

Population (2024)
  - Total: 809
- Time zone: UTC+1 (CET)
  - Summer (DST): UTC+2 (CEST)

Mazrek is a village in Kosovo located in the Prizren District.

== Etymology ==
Mazrek is an Albanian toponym which means 'horse breeder' and can be found throughout the region in placenames including Mazrek, Shkoder and Mazrek, Tirana.

== History ==
The village was first recorded in the Ottoman register of 1452. The village was also recorded in the Ottoman register of 1571. The village then had 27 households.

== Notable people ==
- Pjeter Mazreku
