= Babaj i Bokës =

Village in Kosovo

Babaj i Bokës Babaj Boks
- Village
- Location within Kosovo
- Coordinates: 42°21′42″N 20°20′3″E
- Country: Kosovo
- District: Gjakova
- Municipality: Gjakova

Population (2024)
  - Total: 487
- Time zone: UTC+1 (CET)
  - Summer (DST): UTC+2 (CEST)

Babaj i Bokës is a village in the municipality of Gjakova, Kosovo. According to the Kosovo Agency of Statistics (KAS), 487 people resided in Babaj i Bokës at the 2024 census, with Albanians constituting the majority.
