= Goden (Gjakova) =

Goden: Godeni/Goden (Albanian); Годен/Goden (Serbian)
- Village
- Location within Kosovo
- Coordinates: 42.29769421016765°N 20.447637885813226°E
- Country: Kosovo
- District: Gjakova
- Municipality: Gjakova

Population (2011)
  - Total: 72
- Time zone: UTC+1 (Central European Time)
  - Summer (DST): UTC+2 (CEST)

Goden is a hamlet in Gjakova District, Kosovo. Goden is situated nearby to the hamlet Dobrunë and the village Zylfaj.

Goden was mentioned in the Ottoman register of 1571. The village consisted at the time of four Mehallas and had 49 homes. The defter indicates that the village was inhabited by an Albanian population, the inhabitants names were Albanian.
