= Beci, Kosovo =

Beci: Beci (Albanian); Бец/Bec (Serbian)
- Village
- Location within Kosovo
- Coordinates: 42°26′35″N 20°26′58″E
- Country: Kosovo
- District: Gjakova
- Municipality: Gjakova
- Elevation: 350 m (1,150 ft)

Population (2024)
  - Total: 956
- Time zone: UTC+1 (Central European Time)
  - Summer (DST): UTC+2 (CEST)

Beci is a village in the Dushkaja subregion of Gjakova, Kosovo. Albanians form the near-absolute majority of the village's population.

== Etymology ==
It is believed that the toponym is derived from the Albanian word Bec-i, which means "little lamb" in Albanian.

== Geography ==
Beci is bordered by Sapot to the west, Zhdrellë and Rashkoc to the northwest and north, Cërmjan to the northeast, Meqe east, Doblibare and Vraniq to the southeast and with Lugu e Bunarit to the south and southwest. It is located in the ethnographic Dushkaja region, and is situated around 7 km northeast of Gjakova.

== History ==
Beci is divided into two sections - Beci i Epër (Upper Beci) and Beci i Poshtëm (Lower Beci). In the cadastral documents of the Sanjak of Shkodra in 1485, the village is mentioned with the name Beçi. The inhabitants bore a mixture of Albanian, Christian and Slavic names.

In the Ottoman register of 1582 the inhabitants bore majority Albanian names, indicating the village was historically inhabited by an Albanian population.

== Anthropology ==
Beci is inhabited by a near-absolute majority of ethnic Albanians, and most of the inhabitants traditionally belonged to a single Albanian tribal brotherhood around 300 years ago - the Mërturi-Berisha. The village was traditionally divided into 4 neighbourhoods - the neighbourhoods of the Biblekët, Ndreajt, Salcët and Tetajt. The Muslim and Catholic Albanians here belong to the same brotherhood. There is also a family that hails from the Krasniqi tribe and one that hails from the Thaçi tribe.
