= Dobrosh =

- Village
- Location within Kosovo
- Coordinates: 42.44016465189928°N 20.310673776594°E
- Location: Kosovo
- District: Gjakova
- Municipality: Gjakova

Population (2024)
  - Total: 403
- Time zone: UTC+1 (Central European Time)
  - Summer (DST): UTC+2 (CEST)

Dobrosh is a village in the District of Gjakova, Kosovo. According to the 2024 census, it has 403 residents. In Dobrosh there are 4 neighborhoods; Lagjja Cenaj, Lagjja Elezaj, Lagjja Qaush and Lagjja Pajazit. Dobrosh is in the middle of the villages Nivokaz, Junik, Pacaj and Sheremet. It is inhabited by Albanians.

== History ==
The village was mentioned in the Ottoman defter of 1485 as 'Dobrosh i madh' (Big Dobrosh). The Ottoman defter indicates that the village was inhabited by an Albanian population during the 15th century. The names of the inhabitants were mainly Albanian mixed with Slavic and Christian: "Dragan son of Gjon, Nikolla Barbari, Bardo son of Gjon, Andrija son of Petri, Gjon son of Gjon, Andrija son of Gjorgj, Gjon son of Llazar, Gjon son of Marin, Gjin son of Bogdan, Gjon son of Rogam, Todor son of Andrija, Bardo son of Gjon, Gjon Barbari, Nikolla son of Gjon, Gjon son of Glaviq, Gjon his son, Petri son of Llazar, Gjin son of Gjorgj, Vasili his brother, Gjon son of Gjin, Petro son of Gjon, Gjorgj Siromah, Nenko son of Llazar".

In the same defter another village in the area was mentioned with a similar name 'Dobrosh i vogel' (Little Dobrosh).
