= Dugagjin Dedaj =

Swiss footballer (born 1989)

Personal information
- Date of birth: 15 September 1989
- Place of birth: Switzerland
- Position(s): Defender

Senior career*
Years	Team	Apps	(Gls)
-2009/10	FC Herzogenbuchsee		
2010/2011	FC Zürich	1	(0)
2011/2012	FC Baden		
2011/2012	FC Wangen bei Olten		
2012/2013	FC Grenchen		
2013/2014	FC Köniz		
2014	FC Grenchen		
2015/2016	FC Baden		
2017/2018	BSC Old Boys		
- *Club domestic league appearances and goals

Dugagjin Dedaj (born 15 September 1989) is a Swiss footballer.

== Career ==
In 2014, straight after Grenchen lost 10–0 to Swiss Super League club Luzern's youth team, Dedaj was released from Grenchen along with the rest of the starting eleven. However, he stated that his and the rest of the players' names were "publicly exposed on a list". He also claimed that the way they were fired was "completely ridiculous and borders on character assassination".
