= Korenicë, Gjakova =

Korenicë
- Village
- Location within Kosovo
- Coordinates: 42.374984313829344°N 20.3681159340971°E
- Country: Kosovo
- District: Gjakova
- Municipality: Gjakova

Population (2024)
  - Total: 403
- Time zone: UTC+1 (Central European Time)
  - Summer (DST): UTC+2 (CEST)

Korenicë (Serbian: Korenica) is a village in District of Gjakova, Kosovo. Korenicë is situated nearby to the village Guskë and the village Orizë.

== History ==
The village was mentioned in the Ottoman defter of 1485. The Ottoman defter indicates that the village was inhabited by an Albanian population during the 15th century, the inhabitants names were mainly Albanian-Christian: Gjorgj son of Lleshi, Pepa son of Kosh, Gjon his son, Nenko son of Boshko, Gega son of Andrija, Leka son of Stepan, Gega son of Nenko, Pepa son of Andrija, Pavli son of Gjon, Nikolla son of Andrija, Gega son of Petro, Gjon son of Pavli.

On 15 June 1999, a mass grave was discovered by Italian KFOR in the village containing the remains of 120 Albanian civilians who had been burnt beyond recognition in April 1999.
