= Bezzi =

Bezzi is an Italian last name. Notable people with this last name include:

- Bartolomeo Bezzi (1851–1923), Italian painter
- Cristian Bezzi (born 1975), Italian former rugby union player
- Giovanni Francesco Bezzi (active circa 1549–1571), better known as Nosadella, Italian painter and draftsman
- Mario Bezzi (1868–1927), Italian entomologyst
