= Damjan, Kosovo =

Damjan: Damjan (Albanian); Дамјане/Damjane (Serbian)
- Village
- Location within Kosovo
- Coordinates: 42.296000°N 20.516227°E
- Location: Kosovo
- District: Gjakovë
- Municipality: Gjakovë

Population (2024)
  - Total: 4,212
- Time zone: UTC+1 (Central European Time)
  - Summer (DST): UTC+2 (CEST)

Damjan is one of the largest villages in the District of Gjakova, Kosovo.

== History ==
The village was mentioned in the Ottoman register of 1571 with 34 households and was inhabited by a Christian Albanian population. The inhabitants of Damjan bore typical Albanian names such as Dom Biba, Gjergj Koka, Lac Koka, Doci, Doda, Biba, Gjin, Prendi, and Nina.
