= Vrančić =

Vrančić is a Bosnian and Croatian surname, associated with the noble Vrančić family of Bosnian origin. When part of Croatian lands belonged to Republic of Venice, the family name was Veranzio. Slovenian spelling: Vrančič. Notable people with the surname inclcude:

- Antun Vrančić (a.k.a. Antonio Veranzio; 1504–1573), Croatian cardinal, writer and diplomat
- Damir Vrančić (born 1985), Bosnian-Herzegovinian footballer
- Faust Vrančić, better known as Fausto Veranzio (1551–1617), Croatian scientist and inventor
- Mario Vrančić (born 1989), Bosnian-Herzegovinian and German footballer
- Vjekoslav Vrančić (1904–1990), Croatian politician
