= Bishtazhin =

Bishtazhin Bishtazhin
- Village
- Interactive map of Bishtazhin
- Coordinates: 42.355556°N 20.511944°E
- Country: Kosovo
- District: Gjakova
- Municipality: Gjakova

Population (2024)
  - Total: 317
- Time zone: UTC+1 (Central European Time)
  - Summer (DST): UTC+2 (CEST)

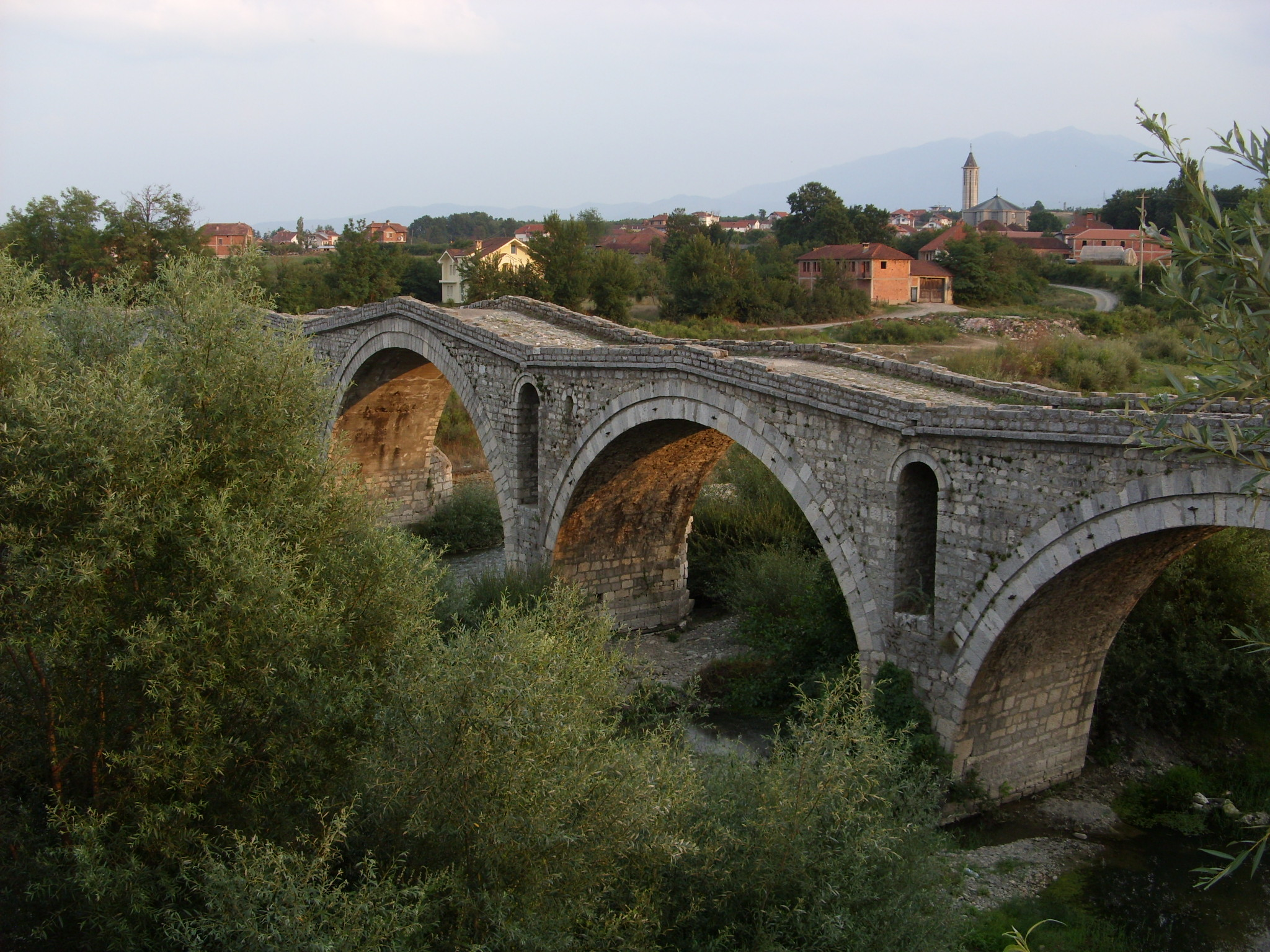
Terzijiski Bridge, located near the village of Bishtazhin.

Bishtazhin (Albanian: Bishtazhin/Bishtrazhin/Bistazhini; Serbian: Бистражин/Bistražin) is a village located near Gjakova, Kosovo. It is inhabited exclusively by Albanians.

== History ==
Bishtazhin was mentioned in the Ottoman defter of 1571 and was inhabited by a Christian Albanian population. The village had 45 households. Bishtazhin was formed during the 16th century. Saint Teresa's mother is believed to have hailed from Bishtazhin.

During the Yugoslav colonisation of Kosovo, 5 Serbo-Montenegrin colonist families were initially settled in Bishtazhin, and in the locality of Bishtazhin-Lipovec-Smaç, a further 33 Serbo-Montenegrin colonist families with 164 people were settled in the area between 1929 and 1933. From 13 to 15 April 1941, Serbian chetniks massacred 72 Catholic Albanians in the village. During World War II, Albanians destroyed the Serbian church in the village.

== Religion ==
Bishtazhin is inhabited by Catholic Albanians. The Church of Our Lady of the Rosary is located in the village.

== Places of interest ==
The Terzi Bridge is nearby.
