= Vraniq, Gjakova =

Vraniq: Vraniq (Albanian); Вранић/Vranić (Serbian)
- Village
- Location within Kosovo
- Coordinates: 42.42954357192483°N 20.476678580150857°E
- Location: Kosovo
- District: Gjakova
- Municipality: Gjakova

Population (2024)
  - Total: 183
- Time zone: UTC+1 (CET)
  - Summer (DST): UTC+2 (CEST)

Vraniq (Serbian: Жабељ, Žabelj) is a village in District of Gjakova, Kosovo. Vraniq is situated nearby to the villages Beci and Doblibare. The village is also known as Vranesh since after the war.

== History ==
The village was possibly mentioned in the Ottoman defters of 1485 as Vraniq with 12 homes. The anthroponomy of the inhabitants of the village indicates it was inhabited by a Christian Albanian population, and the inhabitants of Vraniq bore Albanian names: Gjin son of Nikolla', 'Gjin son of Andrija', 'Nenko son of Progon', 'Nenko son of Gjin', 'Progon son of Gjon', 'Pepa son of Leka', 'Leka brother of Gjon', 'Andrija, son of Leka', 'Pepa, son of Mara', 'Leka son of Todor.
