= Brekoc =

Brekoc: Brekoc (Albanian); Брековац/Brekovac (Serbian)
- Village
- Location within Kosovo
- Coordinates: 42.358092°N 20.405624°E
- Location: Kosovo
- District: Gjakova
- Municipality: Gjakova

Population (2024)
  - Total: 2,561
- Time zone: UTC+1 (Central European Time)
  - Summer (DST): UTC+2 (CEST)

Brekoc (Serbian: Брековац, Brekovac) is one of the largest villages in the District of Gjakova, Kosovo. It is located southwest of Gjakova.

== History ==
The Ottoman defters indicate that the village Brekoc was inhabited by an Albanian population during the 15th century, the names of the inhabitants were mainly Albanian with some Slavic and Christian: Gjorgj, son of Gjin, Gega, son of Gjon, Gjin son of Bora, Branko his son, Stepan son of Gjon, Llazar son of Dimitri, Nenko, son of Ukca, Llazar son of Petr, Dimitri son of Gjon, Gjon son of Petr, Gjon son of Mihail, Dejan Siromah.
