= Shishman, Gjakova =

Shishman
- Village
- Location within Kosovo
- Coordinates: 42.37992976981704°N 20.319771736343°E
- Location: Kosovo
- District: Gjakova
- Municipality: Gjakova

Population (2024)
  - Total: 397
- Time zone: UTC+1 (Central European Time)
  - Summer (DST): UTC+2 (CEST)

Shishman is a village in the District of Gjakova, in Kosovo. Shishman is situated nearby to the villages Duzhnjë and Smolicë.

== History ==
The village was mentioned in the Ottoman defter of 1485 with 20 households. The Ottoman defters indicate that the village was inhabited by an Albanian population during the 15th century; the name of the inhabitants were mainly Albanian with Slavic and Christian anthroponomy.

According to a 23 May 1999 Kosovapress report, Serbian troops killed five Kosovar civilians in the village on 26 April 1999.
