= Skivjan =

Skivjan: Skivjan (Albanian); Скивјане/Skivjane (Serbian)
- Village
- Location within Kosovo
- Coordinates: 42.430310°N 20.383764°E
- Location: Kosovo
- District: Gjakovë
- Municipality: Gjakovë

Population (2024)
  - Total: 1,534
- Time zone: UTC+1 (Central European Time)
  - Summer (DST): UTC+2 (CEST)

Skivjan is one of the largest villages in the District of Gjakova, Kosovo. It is located northwest of Gjakovë.
