= Pjetër Mazreku =

Roman Catholic archbishop

Pjetër Mazreku (1584– 27 November 1634) (Italian: Pietro Massarecchi, Latin: Petrus Massarecchius) was an Albanian prelate of the Roman Catholic Church. He wrote documents on the state of Christians in the Ottoman Empire, and a short 33 word Albanian etymological dictionary, preserved as a manuscript.

== Life ==
Mazreku was born in Prizren, most likely in the village of Mazrek, into an Albanian family from the Mazreku tribe, which spoke in the Gheg dialect of Albanian. He served as the Archbishop of Bar from 1624 to 1634, while in 1631 he became the apostolic visitor of Hungary, Serbia and Slavonia. In 1634 he was ordained as the apostolic administrator of Serbia. Until his death around 1638 he served as Bishop of Prizren.

Mazreku knew many languages, and wrote an etymological dictionary of the Albanian language.

== Annotations ==
His name was spelt in Latin and Italian as Mazzaretus, Massarechio, Maserecho, Masarecho, Masserecco, Massarecius, etc. In Albanian, his name is spelt Pjetër Mazreku.

== Sources ==
- Ehrenpreis, Stefan; Schilling, Heinz (2007). Wege der Neuzeit: Festschrift für Heinz Schilling zum 65. Geburtstag. Duncker & Humblot. ISBN 978-3-428-12394-0.
