= Mazrek, Tirana =

Mazrek
- Village
- Location within Albania
- Coordinates: 41°21′N 19°41′E
- Country: Albania
- County: Tirana
- Municipality: Tirana
- Administrative unit: Kashar
- Time zone: UTC+1 (CET)
  - Summer (DST): UTC+2 (CEST)

Mazrek is a village in the former municipality of Kashar in Tirana County, Albania. At the 2015 local government reform it became part of the municipality Tirana. The etymology of the village possibly comes from the Mazreku tribe, whom may have settled and founded this village hence the name.
