= Vraniq, Suva Reka =

Vraniq: Vraniq (Albanian); Вранић/Vranić (Serbian)
- Village
- Location within Kosovo
- Coordinates: 42.326125°N 20.914139°E
- Location: Kosovo
- District: Prizren
- Municipality: Suharekë
- Elevation: 809 m (2,654 ft)

Population (2024)
  - Total: 1,394
- Time zone: UTC+1 (CET)
  - Summer (DST): UTC+2 (CEST)

Vraniq (Albanian: Vraniq/Arrishtë, Serbian Cyrillic: Вранић/Vranić) is a village in Suharekë municipality, Kosovo.
