= Berjah =

- Village
- Location within Kosovo
- Coordinates: 42.42144481292018°N 20.291275976719778°E
- Country: Kosovo
- District: Gjakova
- Municipality: Gjakova

Population (2011)
  - Total: 154
- Time zone: UTC+1 (Central European Time)
  - Summer (DST): UTC+2 (CEST)

Berjah is a village in the district of Gjakova, Kosovo. Berjah is situated nearby to the village Stubëll and the village Brovinë.

== History ==
Berjah was mentioned as a village in the Ottoman defter of 1485 with 27 homes, 3 of them Muslim. The Ottoman defter of the 15th century indicates that Berjah was inhabited by a mostly Albanian population; the names of the inhabitants were overwhelmingly Albanian mixed with Slavic and Christian elements.
