= Ponoshec =

Ponoshec: Ponoshec (Albanian) Ponoševac or Поношевац (Serbian)
- Village
- Interactive map of Ponoshec
- Coordinates: 42.404572494551665°N 20.284345149999996°E
- Country: Kosovo
- District: Gjakova
- Municipality: Gjakova

Population (2024)
  - Total: 505
- Time zone: UTC+1 (CET)
  - Summer (DST): UTC+2 (CEST)

Ponoshec (Serbian: Поношевац, Ponoševac) is a village in District of Gjakova, Kosovo. Ponoshec is situated nearby to the villages Stubëll and Berjah.

== History ==
In the area of Ponoshec, burial mounds from the Bronze Age-Iron Age period have been found.

Ponoshec was mentioned as a village in the Ottoman defters of 1485 as Bonoshuci, the village then had nine homes. The defters indicate that Ponoshec was largely inhabited by an Albanian population, the inhabitants names were mainly Albanian mixed with Christian and Slavic elements.

During the Yugoslav colonisation of Kosovo, 51 Serbo-Montenegrin colonist families were settled in Ponoshec by the Yugoslav government. During World War II, Albanians destroyed the Serbian church in the village.

In May 1998, during the Kosovo War, the village was the site of major clashes between Serbian police and Kosovo Liberation Army militants.
