= District of Gjakova =

District of Kosovo

Coordinates: 42°23′24″N 20°25′48″E

District of Gjakova: Rajoni i Gjakovës (Albanian) Đakovički okrug/ Ђаковички округ (Serbian)
- District of Kosovo
- Location of Gjakova District in Kosovo
- Interactive map of District of Gjakova
- Country: Kosovo
- Capital: Gjakova

Area
  - District: 949 km^{2} (366 sq mi)

Population (2024)
  - District: 124,441
  - Rank: 4th
  - Density: 131/km^{2} (340/sq mi)
- Postal code: 50000
- Vehicle registration: 07
- Municipalities: 3
- Settlements: 127
- HDI (2023): 0.788 high · 5th

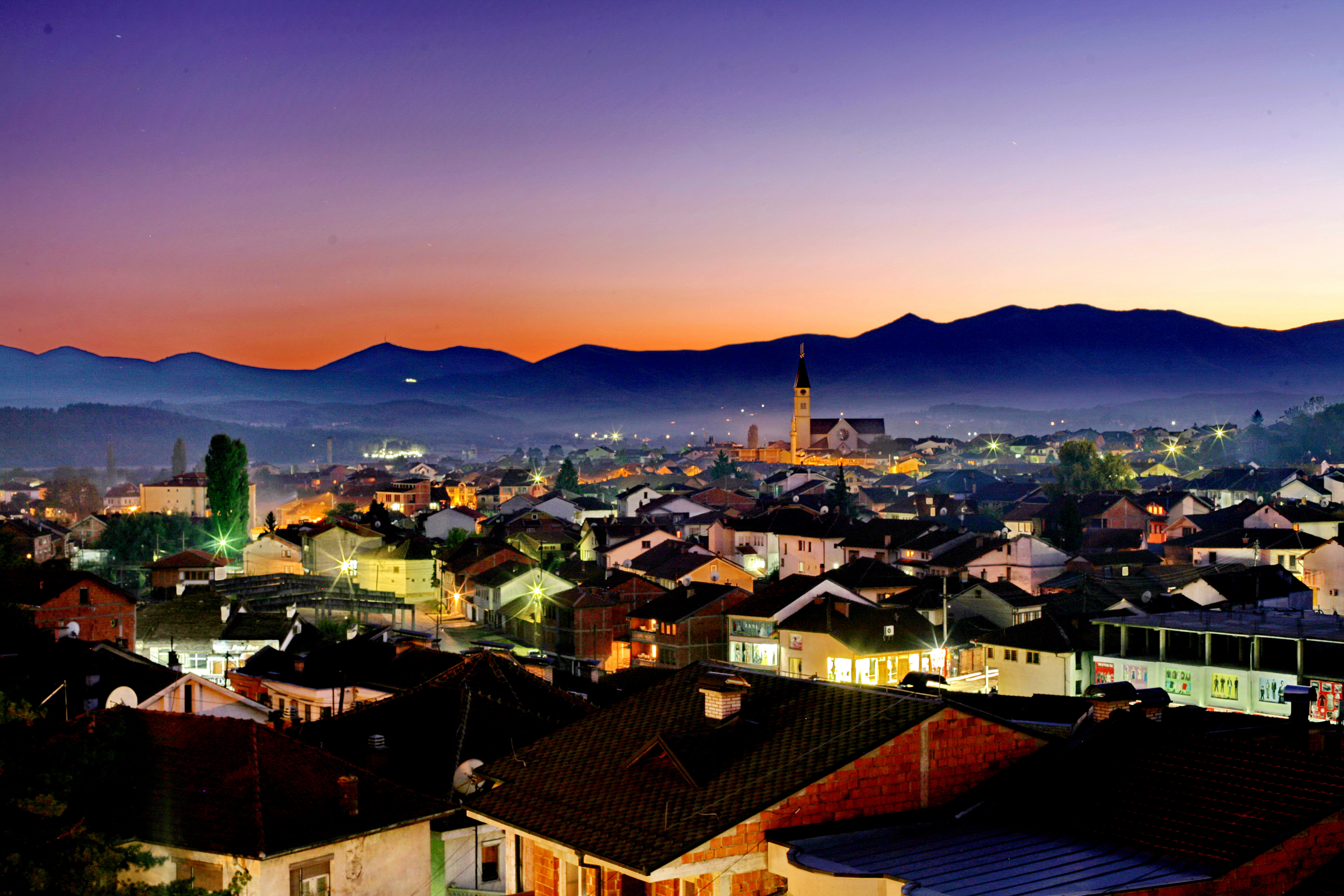
District of Gjakova

The District of Gjakova (Albanian: Rajoni i Gjakovës; Serbian: Ђаковички округ, romanized: Đakovički okrug) is one of the seven districts of Kosovo, with seat in the city of Gjakova.

== Municipalities ==
The district of Gjakova has a total of 3 municipalities and 127 other smaller settlements.

Municipality	Population (2024)	Area (km2)	Settlements
Gjakova	78,699	587	88
Rahovec	41,799	276	36
Junik	3,943	86	3
Gjakova District	124,441	949	127

=== Settlements ===
==== Gjakova Municipality ====
- Babaj i Bokës
- Bardhaniq
- Bardhasan
- Botushë
- Beci
- Berjah
- Bishtazhin
- Brekoc
- Brovina
- Qerret
- Qerim
- Cërmjan
- Damjan
- Deva
- Gjakova
- Doblibarë
- Dobriqë
- Dobrosh
- Novosellë e Poshtme
- Dujakë
- Hereç
- Firza
- Fshaj
- Goden
- Novosellë e Epërme
- Gërqina
- Gërgoc
- Guskë
- Jabllanicë
- Jahoc
- Janosh
- Kodralija – Beckë
- Korenicë
- Koshare
- Kralane
- Kushavec
- Lipovec
- Marmullë
- Meqë
- Orizë
- Madanaj
- Mejë
- Moglik
- Molliq
- Morinë
- Novokaz
- Osek Hilë
- Osek Pashë
- Palabardhë
- Pjetershtan
- Plançor
- Ponoshec
- Popovc
- Racë
- Rracaj
- Radoniq
- Rakoc
- Ramoc
- Rogova I
- Rogovë II
- Zidi Sadikagës
- Sheremet
- Shishman
- Skivjan
- Smaq
- Smolicë
- Stubell
- Trakaniq
- Ujz
- Vogovë
- Vraniq
- Zhabel
- Zhdrellë
- Zhub
- Zulfaj

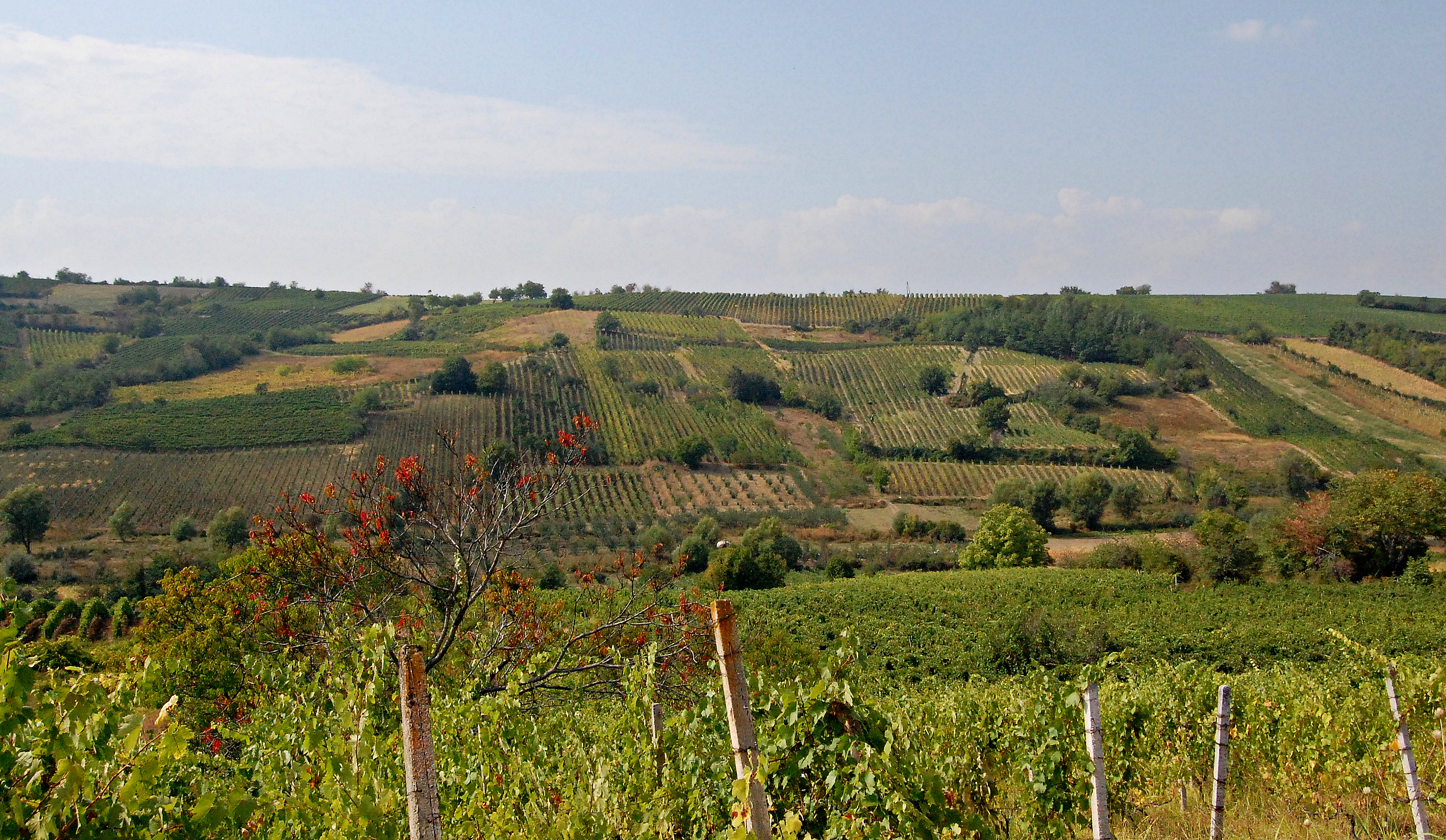
Rahovec, District of Gjakova

==== Rahovec Municipality ====
- Fortesë
- Dejne
- Bratotinë
- Brestovc
- Birnjak
- Celina
- Qifllak
- Damnjan
- Dabidoll
- Pataqan i Ultë
- Drenoc
- Gexhë
- Pataqan i Epërm
- Koznik
- Kramovik
- Hoca e Vogël
- Mrasor
- Nashpalla
- Nagavc
- Apterushë
- Rahovec
- Petkovc
- Polluzha
- Pastasellë
- Radostë
- Ratkoc
- Reti
- Sarosh
- Senovc
- Sopniq
- Hoqë e Madhe
- Hoqë e Vogel
- Krusha e Madhe
- Krusha e Vogel
- Vranjak
- Zatriq
- Zaçishtë
- Xërxë

==== Junik Municipality ====
- Jasiq-Gjocaj
- Junik

== Postal Code ==
Postal Code of Kosovo – 50000 Gjakova
District	Municipality	Local	Code
Gjakova	Gjakova	Gjakova	50000
Gjakova	Gjakova	Gjakova 1	50010
Gjakova	Gjakova	Gjakova 4	50040
Gjakova	Gjakova	Gjakova 5	50050
Gjakova	Gjakova	Gjakova 6	50060
Gjakova	Gjakova	Gjakova 7	50070
Gjakova	Gjakova	Gjakova 8	50080
Gjakova	Gjakova	Gjakova 9	50090
Gjakova	Gjakova	Gjakova 10	50100
Gjakova	Gjakova	Bishtazhin	50500
Gjakova	Gjakova	Junik	51050
Source: Post and Telecommunications of Kosovo J.S.C. (PTK) "List of postal codes" (PDF). Archived from the original (PDF) on 2006-06-30. (199 KiB)
