= Qafë Morinë =

- Location within Albania
- Interactive map of Qafë Morinë
- Traversed by: SH22

Third Approach
- Location: Albania–Kosovo border
- Range: List of mountains in Albania
- Coordinates: 42°24′44″N 20°13′14″E

Qafa e Morinës is a mountain pass through the Albanian mountains along the border between Albania and Kosovo. There is a border crossing point here between the two countries.
