= Mazrek, Shkodër =

Mazrek
- Village
- Location within Albania
- Coordinates: 42°5′17″N 19°39′44″E
- Country: Albania
- County: Shkodër
- Municipality: Shkodër
- Administrative unit: Guri i Zi
- Time zone: UTC+1 (CET)
  - Summer (DST): UTC+2 (CEST)

Mazrek is a settlement in the former Guri i Zi municipality, Shkodër County, northern Albania. At the 2015 local government reform it became part of the municipality Shkodër. The etymology of the village possibly comes from the Mazreku tribe, whom may have settled and founded this village hence the name.
