= Albanian uprisings in the Ottoman Empire =

Albanian resistance against Ottomans

At the conclusion of the Albanian-Ottoman Wars in the 15th century, the Albanian people revolted against the Ottoman Empire. These actions during this time continued an extended period of conquest and border expansion into Southeastern Europe. The Ottomans were left in control of all the main Albanian cities, besides Durrës and Ulcinj, which were still controlled by the Venice. Albania would be ruled by the Ottomans for over 400 years, but this rule would be frequently disrupted by revolts and uprisings with varying degrees of success.

== Background ==
The Ottoman conquest after the Albanian–Ottoman Wars decimated Albania's ability to mount a military threat to Ottoman rule overall. The local Albanian nobility either fled the country or adapted to the new conditions of Ottoman rule. A significant part of the population had also fled to Italy and Greece. Economically, the country had been desolated by the Ottoman campaigns of the second half of the 15th century. In these circumstances, a centralized defensive effort similar to the one led by Skanderbeg was not possible, however, localized pockets of resistance continued to challenge Ottoman authority in the more remote areas of the hinterland. In some occasions, these were inspired by members of the pre-Ottoman noble families who had settled in Italy or Greece. The leaders of revolts and uprisings from the 16th century until the middle of the 19th century would usually seek to gain support from a foreign power, or coordinate efforts with fellow rebels from other Albanian regions. Armed rebellions were frequent in Albanian territories and they were usually combined with political ascension of local elites in the Ottoman hierarchy as a means to increase the rights of Albanian groups.

== Resistance by Albanian nobility ==
In 1481, Nicholas Dukagjini and Lekë Dukagjini returned to Albania. The Rector of Ragusa wrote to the king Ferdinand I of Naples (Ferrante), informing him on June 2, 1481 that Prince Vlatko had returned to Bosnia, while Nicholas Dukagjini went to Albania to join the armed movements against the Ottomans. Gjon Kastrioti II, who had been fighting the Ottomans in Otranto, sailed to Albania in four Neapolitan ships (galera) with his cousin Konstandin Muzaka. He disembarked south of Durrës, Konstandin sailed further south to Himara, while Nicholas and Lekë Dukagjini headed to Upper Albania, in the highlands of Alessio (Lezhë) and Shkodra, where they led the uprising in the north. Nicholas and Lekë's forces attacked the town of Shkodra and forced Hadım Suleiman Pasha to send further military reinforcements in the region. Konstandin carried military actions in the coastal region of Himarë, meanwhile an Albanian infantry of 7,000 was gathered around Gjon Kastrioti. Gjon severely defeated an Ottoman army of 2,000 to 3,000, captured Himara on August 31, 1481 and later Sopot (Borshi) Castle and took captive Hadım Suleiman Pasha, who was sent to Naples as a trophy of the victory and eventually was set free under a ransom of 20,000 ducats. The military campaign led by Nicholas and Lekë Dukagjini in the northern highlands and by Kastrioti and Muzaka in central and south Albania, were conducted to impede new Ottoman troops to reach Italy and their transient success had an external impact on the liberation of Otranto on September 10, 1481.

In 1501, Nicholas' son, Progon had returned to Albania from Italy, to lead an anti-Ottoman rebellion in North Albania. Eventually he signed an agreement with the Ottomans and was given the title Pasha of Rumelia, as well as the dominion over a part of the Dukagjini properties in the form of timar.

The Bushati family would gain power on Ottoman ranks and become Pashas. Kara mahmud pasha would take control of the Pashalik of scutari. In 1785, he started a rebellion against the Ottoman Empire. He loses large parts of its territories held outside of the Sanjak of Scutari. The Ottomans fail to overthrow Kara Mahmud Pasha after a decisive defeat in the Siege of Shkodra. Outbreak of the Russo-Turkish War in 1787 and the Austro-Turkish War in 1788 forces Ottoman Authorities to withdraw from further Operations against Kara Mahmud Pasha. After Imperial pardon Kara Mahmud Pasha joins the Ottomans against the Austrians in the Austro-Turkish War.

Ten years after the start of the First Bushati-Ottoman war. Kara mahmud pasha would revolt against the Ottomans once more. This time in 1795 Kara Mahmud Pasha conquered parts of Southern Albania and much of Kosovo. Kara Mahmud Pasha defeated Ottoman forces in Prizren and annexed the Sanjak by installing his own nephew as governor of the sanjak. Ottomans besieged Shkodra and retreated after being defeated by Kara Mahmud Pasha, then returned but again failed to complete the siege.

Muhammad Ali pasha's rise to power in Egypt came following a long, three-way civil war between the Ottoman Empire, Egyptian Mamluks who had ruled Egypt for centuries, and Albanian mercenaries in the service of the Ottomans. The conflict ended in victory for the mercenaries led by Ali.

In 1820, Ali Pasha Tepelena, the pasha of the Pashalik of janina, would get ideas of independence from the Ottoman Empire. As a result, the Ottomans would crack down on the Pashalik, besieging the capital Janina for 2 years before successfully killing the pasha and dissolving the Pashalik.

In 1831, The Ottomans demand that Mustafa Bushati, leader of the Pahsalik of Scutari, hand over the districts of Dukakin, Debar, Elbasan, Ohrid and Trgovište. Bushati refuses and, with support from Serbia, invades Ottoman lands in Europe, taking Prizren and Skopje followed by Sofia in mid-March. Ottomans besiege Shkodër in April and the rebels are defeated at Skopje in May. Bushati withdraws from Prizren and Skopje to defend Shkodër. After a 6-month siege, Bushati surrenders Shkodër in November, ending the war. The Pashalik of Scutari is dissolved.

The First Egyptian-Ottoman war (1831–1833) was a military conflict between the Ottoman Empire and Egypt brought about by Muhammad Ali Pasha's demand to the Sublime Porte for control of Greater Syria, as reward for aiding the Sultan during the Greek War of Independence. As a result, Egyptian forces temporarily gained control of Syria, advancing as far north as Kütahya. The great powers intervened fearing a strong, independent Egyptian state being formed instead of a weak, crumbling Ottoman state. Muhammad Ali was still allowed to hold onto greater Syria after the war, however tensions would still be around.

In 1839, the Ottoman Empire moved to reoccupy lands lost to Muhammad Ali in the First Turko-Egyptian War. The Ottoman Empire invaded Syria, but after suffering a defeat at the Battle of Nezib appeared on the verge of collapse. On 1 July, the Ottoman fleet sailed to Alexandria and surrendered to Muhammad Ali. Britain, Austria and other European nations, rushed to intervene and force Egypt into accepting a peace treaty. From September to November 1840, a combined naval fleet, made up of British and Austrian vessels, cut off Ibrahim's sea communications with Egypt, followed by the occupation of Beirut and Acre by the British. On 27 November 1840, the Convention of Alexandria took place. British Admiral Charles Napier reached an agreement with the Egyptian government, where the latter abandoned its claims to Syria and returned the Ottoman fleet in exchange of the recognition of Muhammad Ali and his sons as the only legitimate rulers of Egypt.

== Ottoman rule in remote areas ==
After capturing Shkoder in 1479, the Ottomans did not succeed in extending their rule around the Albanian Alps until 1491, when they finally were able to register the population of Kelmendi for tax collection purposes. Not only around the Albanian Alps, but also in other mountainous regions, the Ottomans had to concede local tribes the right to self-governance according to the local traditions, such as the Kanun of Leke Dukagjini. In an effort to pacify these regions, they recognized Albanian tribes as self-governing units led by their own bajraktars, and ruled in very decentralized fashion. Until the Tanzimat Reforms, these tribes only paid tribute once a year, continued to bear weapons, and their children were not taken into the Devshirme system. When it was required, Albanian tribes joined Ottoman military campaigns as compact units and commanded by their own leaders, and returned home after the war. In areas of strategic interest, especially near trade routes or militarily important roads, the Ottomans even gave local tribes the status of debrenci, as protectors of peace and order. Despite the substantial concessions, the highland tribes never fully integrated into the empire, and would frequently launch revolts and uprisings against the Ottomans.

=== Northern highlands ===
Among the Albanian tribes of the northern highlands, the Kelmendi obtained debrenci status and became the most powerful, seriously threatening Ottoman rule around the Albanian Alps until the early 18th century. Other tribes, such as Kuçi, Palbardhi, Gruda, Hoti, etc., also participated in regular revolts.

As early as 1538, the Kelmendi rose up against the Ottomans and may have done so also in 1565 as Kuçi and Piperi were also in rebellion.

In 1609, Venetian documents mention the Kelmendi as being in a conflict with the Ottomans for 4 consecutive years. The local Ottomans were unable to counter them and were thus forced to ask the Bosnian Pasha for help.

In 1614, the Convention of Kuçi held in the area of the Kuçi tribe in the region of Malësia in modern northernmost Albania and Montenegro, to create an anti-Ottoman alliance and gain western support.

In 1694, the Hoti and Kuçi tribe rose up against the Ottomans

Throughout the 1630s, Kelmendi was in regular clashes with the Ottomans, which culminated in 1637–38, when the tribe would repel an army of 12,000 (according to some sources 30,000) commanded by Vutsi Pasha of the Bosnia Eyalet. Ottoman casualties vary from 4,000 to 6,000, based on different sources. The legend of Nora of Kelmendi would come to life during this epic struggles.

In 1658, the seven tribes of Kuči, Vasojevići, Bratonožići, Piperi, Kelmendi, Hoti and Gruda allied themselves with the Republic of Venice against the Ottomans, establishing the so-called "Seven-fold barjak" or "alaj-barjak".

In 1688, an uprising in Medun would take place. The Kelmendi, Kuçi and Piperi tribes would revolt against the Bushati rule there. They would win 2 battles and capture the area of Medun and its supplies.

In 1689, the Kelmendi joined other tribes from northern and northeastern Albania, as well as Albanians from Prizren, Pristina and other regions of Kosovo, in support of the Imperial Army of the Holy Roman Empire during its Kosovo campaign.

In 1774, the Pashalik of Scutari invaded Brda. The Kuçi and Palabardhi tribes managed to defend against the attacking Shkodrans. Kara Mahmud Pasha would try again in 1794 but was once again unsuccessful.

In 1832, Hoti, Kastrati, Gruda and Kelmendi joined Montenegrin forces and defeated Ottoman forces on Hoti mountain.

In May 1845, following Reşid Pasha's outloawing of arm bearing, 2000 people from the Gjakova region, and the Highlands of Gjakova tribes of Krasniqi, Gashi, Bytyçi rose in revolt. The rebels, comprising about 8,000 men, drove the Ottoman garrison out of Gjakova. The Ottomans suppressed the rebellion, but did not succeed in establishing effective control of the region.

In 1862 the Ottomans sent Maxharr Pasha with 12 divisions to implement the Tanzimat Reforms in the Highlands of Gjakova. Under the leadership of Mic Sokoli and Binak Alia, the tribes of Krasniqi, Gashi, Bytyçi, Nikaj-Mertur organized the resistance near Bujan. The rebels were reinforced by the forces of Shala, led by Mark Lula. After heavy fighting, they managed to defeat the Ottoman force and expel them from the highlands.

Northern Albanian leaders, such as Sulejman Aga of Botushë – a chieftain of the Gashi tribe in the Gjakova region during the early 20th century – organised resistance and movements for independence against the Ottomans throughout the 19th–20th centuries; in one such uprising, Sulejman Aga led 5,000–6,000 Albanian fighters who gathered outside of Gjakova and attacked the garrison in an attempt to enter the city. In 1904, 10 Ottoman battalions accompanied by artillery were sent to Gjakova in order to quell the uprising. Shemsi Pasha and the Ottomans enforced heavy taxes upon the local Albanians in response to the uprising, and the hostilities were accompanied by forcible tax collection and the destruction of entire villages in the Gjakova region by Ottoman forces. Upon his arrival in Botushë, Shemsi Pasha – with five battalions and numerous artillery pieces – began bombarding the village. The Ottomans were resisted by 300 Albanian fighters under Sulejman Aga Batusha. The resistance fighters lost 35 dead or wounded, and the Ottomans lost more than 80 soldiers. Another 300 Albanian fighters arrived and surrounded the Ottoman force, who were numerically superior and in better positions. 2,000 Albanian tribesmen would eventually gather to fight the Turks, and the Ottoman government sent 18 more battalions accompanied by artillery to quell this new uprising; Shkup's Vali, Shakir Pasha, also went to Gjakova. A series of ensuing battles followed in the Gjakova region, resulting in the deaths of more than 900 Ottoman soldiers as well as 2 bimbashis and a dozen officers, whereas the Albanians suffered only 170 dead or wounded. Shakir Pasha was thereby ordered to stand down.

=== Dukagjin and Mirdita ===
In 1565, Puka, Iballa, Mirdita, Luma and other regions in Dukagjin had blocked the road from Shkoder to Prizren and had started attacking the lowlands too.In 1560, 500 peasants from Rec, Dardhe, Lure and other parts of Diber rose to arms and killed the local sipahis.

Around 1591, the mountains behind Kruja, Lezha and Shkoder had rebelled against the Ottomans with 6000 armed warriors, causing considerable damage in their continuous incursions.

In 1601–1602, the Convention of Dukagjin (Alb. Kuvendi i Dukagjinit) gathered Albanian nobles and leaders in the village of Macukull, in the Mati region The convention was attended by 2656 representatives, and included both secular and religious representatives, from 14 various Albanian districts. There were Albanians from the highlands of Shkodër, Zadrima, Dukagjin, Kosova, Lezha, Kurbin, Mat, Dibra, Petrela, Durrës, Elbasan, Shpat and from Myzeqe. The convention was headed by Nikollë Bardhi, Gjin Gjergji and Nikollë Mekajshi. The convention decided to wage war against the Ottoman Empire in an attempt of liberation. The decision was approved by 56 main leaders, consisting of 13 representatives who all sealed the act which the text “Sigillum Regni Macedonia et Albaniae” (The Seal of the Macedonian and Albanian Kingdom) with the double-headed eagle.

In 1609, Venetian documents state that the tribes of the Dukagjin Highlands had been in conflict with the Ottomans for four years.

In 1862, a revolt in Mirdita took place against the kapedan there, Bib Dodë Pasha. Despite the rebels raiding his land in Kallmet and occupying the road connecting Shkodër to Prizren. Bib Dodë pasha would call in Ottoman support of which suppressed the revolt in Mirdita. France would vocally support the rebels while Britain and Austria would take the side of the Ottomans in this revolt.

=== Himara and Labëria ===
In 1481, the Himariotes had joined the forces of Gjon Kastrioti II (son of Skanderbeg) in his uprising against the Ottomans. The uprising failed, but the Himariotes rose up again in 1488, and between 1494 and 1509, destabilizing Ottoman control though failing to liberate their territory.

In 1532, the Himara region, which still included all of Labëria, was considered a Venetian official to be one of the regions of Albania still under "Albanian lordship", and could field 20000 warriors against the Ottomans. The Ottoman Sultan Suleiman the Magnificent personally mounted an expedition in 1537 that destroyed or captured many surrounding villages but did not manage to subdue the area. The Ottomans found it necessary to compromise with the inhabitants by giving them a series of privileges: local self-government, the right to bear arms, exemption from taxes, the right to sail under their own flag into any Ottoman port and to provide military service in time of war. However, despite the privileges, the Himariotes revolted during the following conflicts: Ottoman–Venetian War (1537–40), Ottoman–Venetian War (1570–73), Morean War (1684–99), Ottoman–Venetian War (1714–18) and the Russo-Turkish wars of the 18th century.

In 1567, Himariots are counted among Albanians that could be rallied against the Ottoman, as they, together with other Albanians, had caused great damage to the Ottomans since 1537.

In 1606, there was an uprising in the Lopes region of Kurvelesh.

In 1661, both the Muslims and the Christians of the region had joined in rebellion against the Ottomans. In 1720, the villages of Himara, Palasa, Ilias, Vuno, Pilur and Qeparo refused to submit to the Pasha of Delvina.

In 1703, the villages of Progonat and Kardhiq rose up in arms. They were joined by the castellan of Tepelene, Muco Hyso. The uprising spread to all the parts of Kurvelesh in 1704, and the Ottomans had to send Hydaverdi Pasha to defeat the rebels. However, by 1707, Kurvelesh had rebelled once more.

Himara revolted again in 1767, laying siege to Delvinë and Vlorë, but were eventually defeated by Ottoman reinforcements from nearby regions. This defeat resulted in large numbers fleeing to Apulia and Corfu, where many were recruited as Albanian contingents for the Russian fleet.

In 1847, under the leadership of Zenel Gjoleka, Rrapo Hekali, Hodo Nivica and others, the Laberia region started a revolt against the Tanzimat reforms, scoring several military successes and liberating the main town of the region. The Ottomans were able to defeat the rebels only after several months of warfare.

== Rilindja ==
=== League of Prizren ===
The treaty of San Stefano triggered profound anxiety among the Albanian people meanwhile, and it spurred their leaders to organize a defense of the lands they inhabited. On 10 June 1878, about eighty delegates from the four Albanian-populated vilayets, met in Prizren. The delegates declared the formation of the League of Prizren, which consisted of two branches, including the Prizren branch and the southern branch.

The League of Prizren had 30,000 armed members under its control, who launched a revolution against the Ottoman Empire, after the debacle at the Congress of Berlin and the official dissolution of the league ordered by the Ottomans, who feared the league would seek total independence from the empire. The first military operation of the league was the attack against Mehmed Ali Pasha, the Ottoman marshal who would oversee the transfer of Plav-Gucia area to Montenegro. On 4 December 1879 members of the league participated in the Battle of Novšiće and defeated Montenegrin forces who tried to take control over Plav and Gusinje. After the breakout of open war the league took over control from the Ottomans in the Kosovo towns of Gjakova, Mitrovica, Peja, Prizren and Vushtrri. Guided by the autonomous movement, the league rejected Ottoman authority and sought complete secession from the Sublime Porte. The Ottoman Empire sought to suppress the league and they dispatched an army led by Ottoman commander Dervish Pasha, that by April 1881 had captured Prizren and crushed the resistance at the Battle of Ulcinj. The leaders of the league and their families were either killed or arrested and deported.

=== Revolts of 1910 and 1911 ===
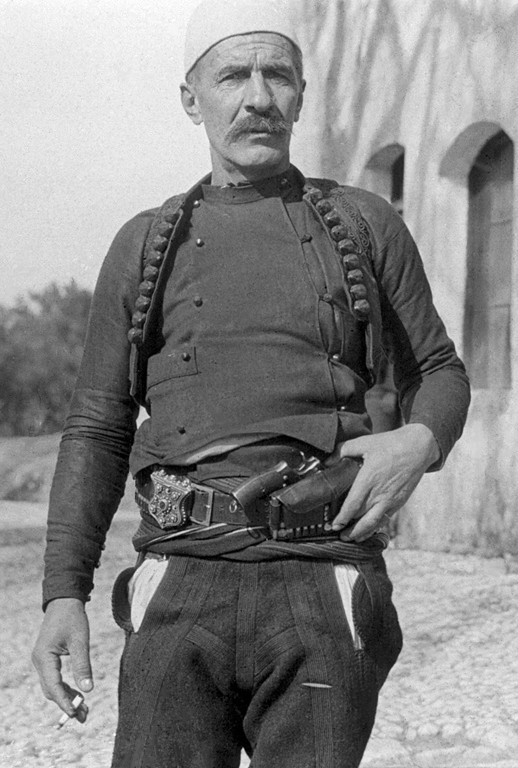
Guerrilla fighter Isa Boletini.

In 1910, due to the new centralisation policies of the Young Turk-Ottoman government towards Albanians, local Albanian leaders Isa Boletini and Idriz Seferi started an uprising against the Ottomans in the Kosovo Vilayet. After subduing the Ottoman garrisons in towns such as Pristina and Ferizaj, the Ottoman government declared martial law and sent a military expedition of 16,000 men led by Shefket Turgut Pasha. Simultaneously, forces under Idriz Seferi captured the Kaçanik pass. They successfully defended the pass from the Ottoman expeditionary force thus, forcing them to send a force of 40,000 men. After two weeks the pass was lost to the Ottomans After fierce fighting, the rebels retreated to Drenica and the Ottomans seized control of Prizren, Gjakova and Peja Afterwards Ottoman forces incurred into northern Albania and Macedonia. Ottoman forces were stopped for more than 20 days in the Agri Pass, from the Albanian forces of Shalë, Shoshë, Nikaj and Mërtur areas, led by Prel Tuli, Mehmet Shpendi, and Marash Delia. Unable to repress their resistance, this column took another way to Scutari, passing from the Pukë region. On 24 July 1910, Ottoman forces entered the city of Shkodër. During this period martial courts were put in action and summary executions took place. A large number of firearms were collected and many villages and properties were burned by the Ottoman army.

In 1911, the Albanian National Committee was formed. In a meeting of the committee held in Podgorica from 2 to 4 February 1911, under the leadership of Nikolla bey Ivanaj and Sokol Baci Ivezaj, it was decided to organise an Albanian uprising. Terenzio Tocci gathered the Mirditë chieftains on 26 or 27 April 1911 in Orosh, proclaimed the independence of Albania, raised the flag of Albania, which according to Robert Elsie it was raised for the first time after Skanderbeg's death, and established the provisional government. Shefqet Turgut Pasha wanted to meet this threat and returned to the region with 8,000 soldiers. As soon as he reached Shkodër on 11 May, he issued a general proclamation which declared martial law and offered an amnesty for all rebels, except for Malësor chieftains, if they immediately return to their homes. After Ottoman troops entered the area Tocci fled the empire abandoning his activities. After months of intense fighting, the rebels were trapped and decided to escape to Montenegro.

On 23 June 1911, in the village of Gerče, Montenegro, an assembly of the tribal leaders of the revolt was held to adopt the Greçë Memorandum. This memorandum was signed by 22 Albanian chieftains, four from each tribe of Hoti, Grudë and Skrel, five from Kastrati, three from Klemendi and two from Shalë. Requests of the memorandum included, a general amnesty for all participants in the revolt, demand for recognition of the Albanian ethnicity, election of the deputies of Albanian ethnicity for the Ottoman Parliament according to the proportional system, Albanian language in schools, governor and other appointed high officials have to know Albanian language and all other positions in the administration have to be reserved only for people of Albanian ethnicity, men who are ethnic Albanians to serve army only in Albania during the peacetime, confiscated arms to be returned and all Albanian property damaged by Ottoman troops to be compensated The Memorandum was submitted to the representatives of Great Powers in Cetinje, Montenegro.

Ottoman representatives managed to deal with the leaders of Albanian rebels in Kosovo Vilayet and Scutari Vilayet separately, because they were not united and lacked central control. The Ottomans promised to meet most Albanian demands, limited mainly to Catholic highlanders like general amnesty, the opening of Albanian language schools, and the restriction that military service was to be performed only in the territory of the vilayets with substantial Albanian population. Other demands included requiring administrative officers to learn the Albanian language, and that the possession of weapons would be permitted.

=== Revolt of 1912 ===
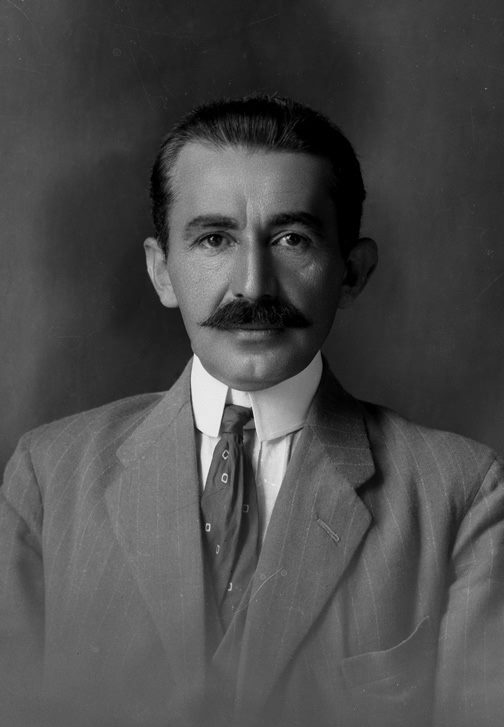
Hasan Prishtina played an instrumental role during the revolt of 1912.

The revolt of 1912 against the mighty Ottoman Empire arose from January to August 1912 and eventually resulted in the formation of Independent Albania. Albanian soldiers and officers from all over the region deserted the Ottoman military service and joined the insurgents. After a series of successes, Albanian revolutionaries managed to capture Skopje, the administrative center of Kosovo Vilayet.

On 9 August 1912, Albanian rebels presented a new list of demands, the so-called list of Fourteen Points, related to the Albanian vilayet, that can be summarized as follows:

- autonomous system of administration and justice of four vilayets populated with Albanians (Albanian vilayet)
- Albanians to perform military service only in territory of four vilayets populated with Albanians, except in time of war
- employing officials who know local language and customs, but not necessarily Albanians,
- establishment of new licees and agricultural schools in the bigger districts
- reorganisation and modernisation of the religious schools and use of Albanian language in secular schools
- freedom to establish private schools and societies
- the development of trade, agriculture and public works
- general amnesty for all Albanians involved in revolt
- court martial for those Ottoman officers who attempted to suppress the revolt

The revolt ended when the Ottoman government agreed to fulfill the rebels' demands, except of the last one, on September 4, 1912. The autonomous system of administration and justice of the four vilayets with a substantial Albanian population was accepted by the Ottoman Empire, however they avoided granting autonomy to a unitary Albanian vilayet which was part of the Albanian National Awakening agenda during the League of Prizren.

==== Aftermath ====
The success of the revolt of 1912 demonstrated that the Ottoman Empire was weak. The Kingdom of Serbia opposed the plan for an Albanian Vilayet, preferring a partition of the European territory of the Ottoman Empire among the four Balkan allies. With the Ottomans weakened and the neighboring countries eager to annex regions inhabited by Albanians, on November 28, 1912, Ismail Qemali declared Albania an independent nation. The independence of Albania would be internationally recognized by the Treaty of London the following year.

== Other revolts and rebellions ==
A series of other notable revolts and rebellions by Albanians erupted throughout the Albanian-populated lands. Around 1560, 500 peasants from Dardhë, Lurë, Reç and other parts of Dibër rose to arms and killed the local sipahis.

In 1565 and 1574, Kruja and Bastar were in revolt. In 1607, Idar Maneshi from the region of Krujë led 3000 men in open rebellion against the Ottomans in the mountains of Mat and Mirdite.

In 1570, 7000–8000 Albanian rebels from the Shkodër lowlands and the Dukagjin highlands attacked the castle of Lezhë for 3 days straight with Venetian support, but failed to capture it. Instead they occupied the Ishull Lezhë, which they kept until 1574.

In 1586, the people of Kaçanik, both Muslims and Christians, rose in rebellion, defeated and expelled, the local Ottoman garrisons. In Tetovë and Dibër, the rebels reached 10000, and the revolt lasted from 1592 until 1595.

In 1611, around 1000 Albanians from 70 villages of the coastal region of the sanjak of Ioannina revolted against Ottoman rule, briefly capturing Ioannina. The rebellion was suppressed by the Ottoman rulers with the assistance of the Greek religious and marchant elites, however many of the Albanians remained in active rebellion in surrounding the mountainous areas.

In 1638, there was a revolt in Elbasan led by the Biçakçiu family.

In 1668, the people of Margëlliç rose against a new tax, and were later joined by rebels in Delvine.

In 1703, both Muslims and Christians in the area of Selita, Macukull and other parts of Mat revolted and attacked the castle of Stelush.

In 1703 and 1707, people rebelled in Kolonjë, Opar and Përmet, the second time simultaneously with the revolt in Kurvelesh.

In 1714, 1500 rebels from the Margëlliç area attacked the castle and expelled the Ottoman garrison.

In 1729, the Mat region refused to pay taxes and rose in rebellion. After the Ottomans mobilized troops from Elbasan, the rebels agreed to pay taxes and send 10 of their own as hostages to the Ottomans. However, as soon as the army left, the Albanian rebels let by Hal Bajrami launched an attack that freed the hostages and they again refused to pay taxes. The Ottoman resolved to launch a powerful offensive which defeated the rebels.

In 1739, Kurvelesh, Margëlliç and Ajdonat also decided to stop paying taxes and rose in arms. The Ottomans crushed the uprising with troops sent from Delvine.

In 1746, an uprising erupted in Berat and Mallakastër against taxation. Once again, the Ottomans successfully suppressed the revolt.

From 1833 to 1839, a series of revolts took place in Albania as a reaction against the new centralising policy of Ottoman administration. Most of which were successful.

In 1843, a massive uprising known as the Albanian Revolt of 1843–1844 erupted in northern Ottoman Albania directed against the Ottoman Tanzimat reforms which started in 1839 and were gradually being put in action in the regions of Albania. The uprising spread out from Shkodër to Kumanovë, but was eventually defeated by the Ottomans.

In 1909, a small uprising in Malësia took place which saw the defeat of the Albanian rebels. Isa Boletini would later ask the clans seeking refuge there to assist him in the 1910 revolt.

In 1914, the International gendarmerie would raid Vlorë and discover more than 200 young Turks and their leader, Bekir Fikri, would be arrested.

== Sources ==
- Akademia e Shkencave e Shqipërisë, Instituti i Historisë; K. Prifti; Xh. Gjeçovi; M. Korkuti; G. Shpuza; S. Anamali; K. Biçoku; F. Duka; S. Islami; S. Naçi; F. Prendi; S. Pulaha; P. Xhufi (2002). Historia e Popullit Shqiptar (Vëllimi I) (in Albanian). Tirana, Albania: Toena. ISBN 99927-1-622-3.
- Doja, Albert (2022). "Ecclesiastical Pressures and Language Politics: The Boundary Work of Albanian Language in the 17th-18th Centuries". Nationalities Papers. 50 (4): 742–769. doi:10.1017/nps.2021.55. S2CID 248275762.
- Elsie, Robert (2010). Historical Dictionary of Albania. Lanham, Maryland: Scarecrow Press. ISBN 978-0-8108-7380-3.
- Elsie, Robert (2015). The Tribes of Albania: History, Society and Culture. I.B.Tauris. ISBN 9780857739322.
- Gawrych, George (2006). The Crescent and the Eagle: Ottoman rule, Islam and the Albanians, 1874–1913. London: IB Tauris. ISBN 9781845112875.
- Noli, Fan (1962). Historia e Skënderbeut (in Albanian). Tirana, Albania: N.Sh. botimeve "Naim Frashëri".
- Skendi, Stavro (1967). The Albanian national awakening. Princeton: Princeton University Press. ISBN 9781400847761.
- Stanojević, Gligor; Vasić, Milan (1975). Istorija Crne Gore (3): od početka XVI do kraja XVIII vijeka. Titograd: Redakcija za istoriju Crne Gore. OCLC 799489791.
- Treptow, Kurt W. (1992). From Zalmoxis to Jan Palach: studies in East European history. East European Monographs. ISBN 978-0-88033-225-5.
