= Bytyqi (disambiguation) =

Bytyqi refers to an Albanian tribe or fis centred in the southeastern Highlands of Gjakova.

Bytyqi may also refer to:

- Arbër Bytyqi (born 2003), Kosovo Albanian professional footballer
- Bardhec Bytyqi (born 1997), Albanian professional footballer
- Enis Bytyqi (born 1997), Kosovo Albanian professional footballer
- Fabiana Bytyqi (born 1995), Czech professional boxer of Kosovan descent
- Hysen Bytyqi (born 1968), Kosovo agricultural scientist
- Sinan Bytyqi (born 1995), retired Kosovo Albanian professional footballer
- Zymer Bytyqi (born 1996), Kosovan footballer
