= Bytyqi =

Region in Albania; historic Albanian tribe

Bytyçi (pronounced [bytyci]) or Bytyqi, Bityçi and Bitiçi refers to an Albanian tribe or fis centred in the southeastern Highlands of Gjakova. The surname derived from the tribe is found throughout Albania and Kosovo.

== Geography ==
The Bytyçi tribe are situated in the southeastern parts of the Highlands of Gjakova, an ethnographic region in north-east Albania and western Kosovo. Bytyçi tribal territory borders Gashi in the northwest over the Luzha Pass (Albanian: Qafa e Luzhës), Krasniqi in the west and Hasi in the south. Beyond the Prush Pass (Albanian: Qafa e Prushit), east of Bytyçi, is the town of Gjakova. Traditional Bytyçi tribal territory also includes the high mountain pastures of Sylbica, nowadays shared by Kosovo and Albania.

== History and origins ==
The term, Bytyç, was first recorded in an Ottoman register of the Sanjak of Dukagjin in 1571; it was a neighbourhood of Rodogosht, and part of Rudina. It was registered as having 39 households at that time. Known as a Muslim tribe, the Bytyçi were a fis (tribe) aware of its common blood ties with each other that stems from a single male ancestor, and consisted of one bajrak. The tribe derives its ancestry from a man called Lekë Bytyçi, who originated from the lower Drin Valley around Koman. He moved with his people eastwards from Koman to today's Viliq. Lekë had three sons - Biba, Vili and Karli. The eldest son, Vili, would settle around Prizren. Biba settled around Rasada and Pac, in the eastern parts of Bytyçi, and would have three sons - Martin, Gjon and Pac. The youngest son, Karli, settled around Viliq in the western part of Bytyçi – he had a son called Vili and many daughters that he married to the Hasi and Krasniqi tribes. Another version of their historical origins claims that they stem from the Shkreli, taking the name Bytyçi from the new region that they had settled in.

In Ottoman times, the Bytyçi region was traditionally part of the kaza of Gjakova, known as Altun-ili. From 1864 to 1912, the Bytyçi region was part of the Vilayet of Kosovo, but the Serbian invasion of Kosovo in 1912 and the subsequent border division cut the Bytyçi tribe off of their main market towns of Gjakova and Peja since the Bytyçi region was thereafter situated within the borders of Albania. Austrian engineer Karl Steinmetz hiked through the region in 1903, labelling it as the richest region of the mountains and stating that, although the Bytyçi were weaker than the Gashi and Krasniqi tribes, they were nonetheless well known for their bravery and prosperity. However, due to being cut off from their market towns in Kosovo as a result of the aforementioned Serbian invasion, the tribe would become destitute.

Serbian forces invaded the Highlands of Gjakova in October 1913, including the Bytyçi region. The Serbian forces burnt down 2,000 homes in the Bytyçi region and killed 51 men. Serbian forces would once again invade the Bytyçi region in June and August 1915. During the autumn of 1915, Serbian forces exterminated the village of Qerret. The Ukshi family, who inhabited the village, were wiped out entirely, save for one family member who was not present in the village during the attack. In 1918, an Austro-Hungarian census recorded 354 households in Bytyçi with 2,044 inhabitants. This included the settlements and surroundings of Berisha, Kam, Kepenek, Luzha, Pac, Vlad, Zherka and Zogaj. In 2004, Bytyçi had a population of 2,078, and in 2008 it had 2,185.

The Bytyçi tribe is known to follow the Kanuni i Malësisë së Madhë, a variant of the Kanun.

== Distribution ==
Many members of the Bytyçi tribe can be found outside of their tribal nucleus in the Gjakova Highlands. Johann Georg von Hahn noted the presence of two Bytyçi villages in the Llap valley in northwestern Kosovo when he travelled there in 1858. Many Bytyçi families can be found in and around Ferizaj, Suhareka and Gjakova.

== Settlements ==
The Bytyçi tribe's settlements within the Gjakova Highlands include:

- Pac
- Zherkë
- Çorraj
- Leniq
- Kam
- Kepenek
- Zogaj
- Viliq (Çorr-Velaj)
- Vlad
- Bregut të Vladit
- Çorroj
- Mash
- Prush
- Visoça
- Zogaj

== Notable people ==
Notable people with the name include:

- Arbër Bytyqi (born 2003), Kosovo Albanian footballer
- Bardhec Bytyqi (born 1997), Albanian footballer
- Enis Bytyqi (born 1997), Kosovo Albanian footballer
- Fabiana Bytyqi (born 1995), Czech professional boxer
- Hysen Bytyqi (born 1968), Kosovan animal scientist and vice-rector at the University Prishtina
- Sinan Bytyqi (born 1995), Kosovo Albanian footballer
- Zymer Bytyqi (born 1996), Norwegian footballer

== See also ==
- Death of the Bytyqi brothers
