= Mahmut Pasha of Begolli =

Ottoman official and commander

Mahmut Pasha of Begolli or Mahmut Mahmutbeyoglu
- Pashalik, Sanxhakbej, Beylerbey

Pashalik of Peja
- Pashalik: 1688–1691
- Family: Begolli family
- Occupation: Pashalik

Mahmut Pasha of Begolli or Mahmut Pasha (Turkish: Mahmut Mahmutbeyoglu or Mahmud Beyoğlu) was an Ottoman Albanian military commander of the Begolli family and Pasha of Peja, Sanjakbey of Dukagjin and later Beylerbey of Rumelia The Albanians participated in the siege of Vienna in 1683 as the personal bodyguard of Grand Vizier Kara Mustafa. Mahmut Pasha is a heroic figure in Albanian folklore and oral tradition.

== Tribal fights ==
In 1690, the Begolli fought the Gashi tribe and forced them to settle in Llap as punishment for their anti-Ottoman stance during the Austro-Turkish War of 1683-1699. In 1735–36, Begolli fought the tribes of Hoti, Kuci, and the Kelmendi. In 1737–40, Begolli fought the Berisha tribe led by Mema of Doda which resulted in the tribe being burnt to the ground. Begolli had a brother named Mustafa Pasha whose son Arslan Pasha built the bazaar of Ioannina.

== Military campaigns ==
In the following years, the Albanian forces came several times to help the Ottoman troops on the Bosnian-Croatian border, with the most important personality of the Albanians, who had participated in the Ottoman campaign on the Hungarian front, the bajraktar of Dukagjin and later Beylerbey of Rumelia, Mahmut Beyoğlu, was. His role and that of the Albanian troops in the Ottoman Empire were not only mentioned by the Ottoman chroniclers, but also by many Western sources. between 1688 and 1691. Begolli fought Austrian forces in 1689 during the Great Turkish War (1683–1699).

== Legacy ==
Begolli is mentioned as a heroic figure in Albanian folklore and oral tradition, and is compared to a lion.
