= Jashar Salihu =

Kosovo Albanian general

- Born: 10 February 1953; Batuša/Botushë, SAP Kosovo, SFR Yugoslavia
- Died: 16 December 2000 (aged 47); Aarau, Switzerland
- Burial place: Pristina, Kosovo
- Military career
- Allegiance: Kosova
- Branch: Kosovo Liberation Army
- Rank: General
- Wars and battles: Kosovo War (1998–99)
- Awards: Hero of Kosovo

Jashar Salihu (10 February 1953 – 16 December 2000) was a Kosovo Albanian general, diplomat and activist who fought for the Kosovo Liberation Army (KLA) during the Kosovo War. He was known for his political efforts and advocacy for the independence of Kosovo, his diplomatic role with the People's Movement of Kosovo (LPK) and also for his work as chairman of the Homeland Calls fund for the KLA.

== Early life and education ==
Salihu was born into a Gash family in Botushë, a village in the Highlands of Gjakova, at the time part of SAP Kosovo, SFR Yugoslavia. He completed his primary education in the nearby Molliq and attended high school in Gjakova. He would then attend university in Pristina, where he graduated from the English Language branch of the Faculty of Philosophy. Throughout the 70's, during his time as a student in Pristina, Salihu was part of the National Movement for the Liberation of Kosovo.

== Political activities ==
Salihu joined the Movement for the National Liberation of Kosovo (MNLK) in 1979, and was Salihu was an active member of the illegalised Committee for Deçan, both of which were headed by prominent activist and ideologue Jusuf Gërvalla. In 1981, Salihu was imprisoned for distributing political pamphlets and jailed in Sarajevo and Foĉa.

He led a gathering at Verrat e Llukës on 1 May 1990, with 500,000 thousand people present, where 106 reconciliations would be reached - 62 blood feuds would be ended, and 25 blights and 19 entanglements would be resolved. At the end of the year, he was arrested again by Yugoslav police and severely tortured by them. Nonetheless, he continued his political activities until he was forced into exile.

Salihu would be part of the People's Movement of Kosovo (LPK), the political precursor to the Kosovo Liberation Army (KLA). He was the chairman of the “Vendlindja Thërret” (Homeland Calls) fund which was based in Switzerland – he collected money from branches set up across Europe and North America, which would then be funnelled to the KLA. He would have a talk in Red Lion Square in London on 5 July 1998, clarifying details and questions about the KLA and appealing for funds to help purchase arms and equipment. By late 1998, Salihu was back in Kosovo, fighting as a soldier in the KLA. Salihu was also present at the mass demonstration in Rambouillet during the international conference regarding the issues in Kosovo, where he made a speech.

On 27 March 1999, during a press conference in Brussels, the spokespeople of the KLA, Jashar Salihu and Yll Selaj, denounced the intensification of massacres of Albanian civilians by Serbian forces since the beginning of NATO's airstrikes against Yugoslavia. In a wartime context where foreign journalists were expelled from Kosovo and communications were almost entirely cut off, they warned the international community of the risk of genocide and called for urgent NATO ground intervention, believing that the airstrikes alone were no longer sufficient to protect the population.

Salihu played an important role in spreading awareness about the KLA and its war against Yugoslav authorities. He was a member of the Foreign Relations Group of Kosovo and would later become the first diplomatic representative of the Provisional Government of Kosovo to Switzerland. He promoted the Kosovo Albanian cause on the worldly stage and helped to combat "anti-Albanian propaganda".

== Legacy ==
Jashar Salihu died on December 16, 2000, in the Cantonal Hospital of Aarau, in Aarau, Switzerland, after a bout with sickness. He left behind 3 sons. He was buried in the graveyard for the martyrs in Pristina, Kosovo, with full military honours. Salihu is remembered for being a dedicated patriot and idealist for Albanian national causes, having dedicated his whole life to the independence of Kosovo with a desire to see the creation of Greater Albania. He is respected for participating in both the front lines of the Kosovo War as well as the political and diplomatic side. He was posthumously awarded both the rank of General by the KPC, and the Hero of Kosovo by former president of Kosovo Atifete Jahjaga. His work as the head of the Homeland Calls fund and his role in spreading awareness about Kosovo and the KLA are well-documented and honoured by Albanians.

== See also ==
- Kosovo War
- Kosovo Liberation Army
