= Dushanovë =

Dushanovë: Dushanovë (Albanian); Душаново/Dušanovo (Serbian)
- Village
- Location within Kosovo
- Coordinates: 42.234650°N 20.709093°E
- Location: Kosovo
- District: Prizren
- Municipality: Prizren
- Elevation: 398 m (1,306 ft)

Population (2024)
  - Total: 7,870
- Time zone: UTC+1 (CET)
  - Summer (DST): UTC+2 (CEST)

Dushanovë (Albanian: Dushanovë/Arbanë, Serbian Cyrillic: Душаново/Dušanovo) is the largest village in the District of Prizren, Kosovo.
