= Gashi (tribe) =

Historical tribe of northern Albania

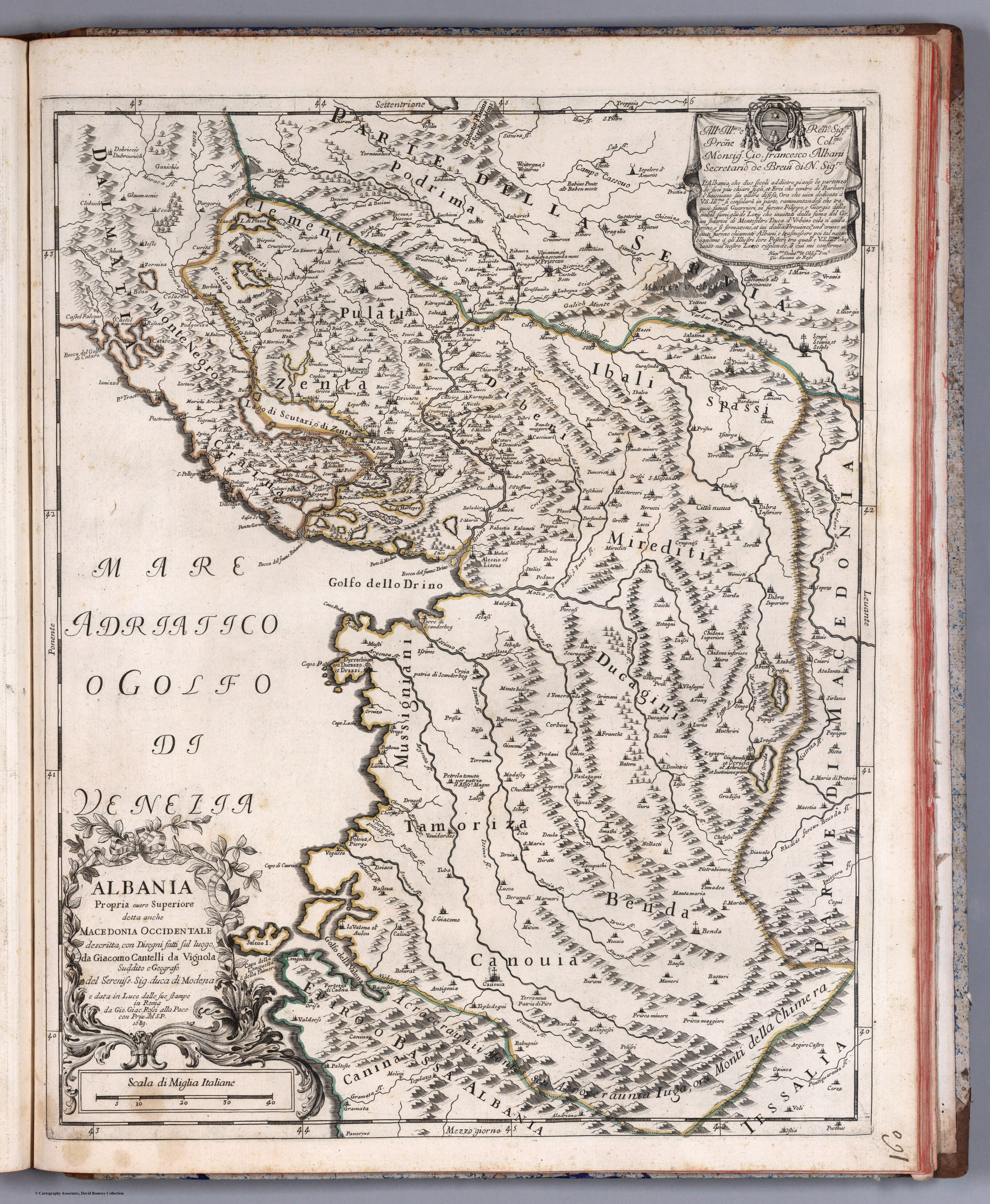
Gasci (Gashi) in 1689 by Italian cartographer, Giacomo Cantelli

Gashi is an Albanian surname and the name of one of the major historical tribes of northern Albania. It is a historical tribal region situated in the Highlands of Gjakova. The Gashi tribe is known to follow the Kanuni i Malësisë së Madhe, a variant of the Kanun. They were known among the mountain tribes for their wisdom.

== Geography ==
Gashi is one of the most widespread Albanian tribes in northern Albania, Kosovo and Macedonia. Their tribal territory corresponds to parts of the districts of Tropoja in Albania and Gjakova in Kosovo; it extends from the east of the town of Bajram Curri to villages such as Botushë and Koshare in Kosovo. Their tribal region is based on the valleys of the Llugaj and Bushtrica rivers, bordering the Krasniqi to the west, the Bytyçi to the south over the Luzha Pass (Qafa e Luzhës), and the Morina to the southeast. The Gashi tribe also held summer pasturelands to the north of the mountain that lies east of Vuthaj.

== Origins ==
The Gashi are centred in the ethnographic region of the Highlands of Gjakova (Albanian: Malësia e Gjakovës), which spans the District of Tropojë in Albania and the Gjakova Municipality in Kosovo. The Gashi are thought to have been the first tribe in the region of Tropoja, i.e. before the Krasniqja. The tribe is traditionally composed of 3 main brotherhoods or smaller tribes:

- The Luzha, mainly inhabitants of Botushë and Luzhë who hail from the original Gashi of Pult that dates back to the 16th century.
- The Bardhi/Bardhaj, who settled the Gjakova Highlands in the early 17th century at the latest.
- The Shipshani, who settled the Gjakova highlands from the beginning of the 17th century.

According to local legend, the Gashi tribe took its current form when the Aga of the Gashi in Botushë united the Luzha with the bajraks of Bardhi and Shipshan as a protective measure against the surrounding tribes, who were larger and more numerous.

=== Folkloric origins ===
According to folkloric tradition, recorded by Baron Nopcsa in 1907, the ancestor of the Shllaku was named "Can Gabeti", who was one of four brothers (the others being the founders of the Gashi, Toplana and Megulla). The four brothers lived in the Shllaku region, where they divided up their possessions. The Gashi and Toplana eventually moved eastwards, with the Gashi first settling in Serma between the Nikaj and Leshnica rivers. Their settlement in Serma was short-lived, and they moved to their current location at around 1660 after Catholic members of the tribe killed 2 imams. Begolli Bey of Peja had his troops surround the tribe and force them to move to a new region (the Highlands of Gjakova) where the native population (Anas) lived. The title 'Anas' is used in several Albanian tribal historiographies, as it is an Albanian term that refers to the indigenous peoples of a region. Anas does not refer to Slavic populations.

Baron Nopsca believed that the Gashi separated from the Toplana and Shllaku tribes at around 1524 or possibly somewhat earlier, probably as a result of the first Ottoman war in Albania. Additionally, historical reference is made to another ancestral father of the Gashi called Leka, the son of Pjetër Spani, who lived in the settlement of Selimaj (Gegëhysen) in the second half of the fifteenth century. However, the alleged connection with Toplana and Shllaku is not supported by genetic results, which indicate that the Toplana and Shllaku are related to one another but do not have blood ties with the Gashi.

== Gashi Brotherhoods ==
The Gashi were traditionally composed of three brotherhoods in the Highlands of Gjakova - the Luzha, Bardhi/Bardhajt and the Shipshani; the Luzha were not blood-related to the Bardhi and Shipshani upon their initial formation as the Gashi tribe.

=== Luzha ===
According to legend, there are two villages (Luzha and Botusha) in the Highlands of Gjakova where the Albanian population of the older Gashi tribe of the 17th century continues to live. Due to their constant resistance against Ottoman rule, the Gashi tribe were repeatedly punished via military expeditions, which led to the departure of the population from their initial settlements and a gradual conversion to Islam in the years 1690–1743. Luzha's current inhabitants remember their ancestors up to 15 generations, of which the first 3-4 have Catholic names, while the rest are Muslim. Even in Botusha and Deçan, about 10-11 generations with Muslim names are remembered, while the previous generations with Catholic names. Both Luzha and Botusha are mentioned by Catholic priests who visited some villages beyond the Diocese of Pult in 1693–1694. In 1697, Luzha itself is mentioned as a village of 12 Catholic homes, and as a seed in the tribe of the Gashi. With the gradual abandonment of the old village of Gash, a large part of the inhabitants moved to different parts of Kosovo, while a part managed to stay in the Gjakova Highlands within the villages of Luzhë and Botushë.

=== Bardhi/Bardhaj ===
The Bardhi/Bardhaj who populated the area between the Gashi River and the Tropoja River are considered to be the descendants of an Albanian called Bardh Aga, who had three sons - Brahim, Ali and Memi Bardhi. These three brothers, who may have lived about 400 years ago according to generational calculations, were Muslims. In a report of 1698, the Bardhaj are already mentioned as a tribe and were distributed amongst 68 households in 4 villages on the Valbona river. They consisted of many Catholic women, but the men were all Muslim. They were initially a distinct tribe separate from the Gashi tribe, both in name and religion (as the Gashi were still mainly Catholic at this time). There are several different legends about their origin, but the one collected by Rrok Zojzi is one of the main theories; this legend states that Bardh Aga came from Kuçi, an Albanian tribe in Montenegro that has since been assimilated by the Slavs, and another one states that the Bardhi came from Kosovo. Bardh Aga was said to have settled with his sons in the area of Gosturan, which is where the Bardhi/Bardhajt still live today.

=== Shipshani ===
The Shipshani are a component of the Gashi tribe that live in the area between the Tropoja River and Qafë Morinë. According to legend, the Shipshani are descendants of the Albanian Kall Kamberi, who had 3 sons - Gegë, Buçë and Papë Kalla - who lived about 14-15 generations ago. The geographical origin of the three brothers is not completely certain, but it is known that Gegaj, Buçaj and Papaj are settlements of the Shipshani, and that the first two generations of the tribe were of the Catholic faith. Based on the calculation of generations, it can be assumed that the spread of the Shipshani in today's territory began in the 17th century. The village of Shipshani is mentioned in the Ottoman register of 1485 as Shipcani.

== History ==
The first mention of the Gashi may have been as a toponym (loca Cassii) somewhere northeast of Albania, which had recently been retaken by Skanderbeg on April 22, 1453. As a patronym, the term 'Gashi' is attested in the Ottoman defter of the Sanjak of Shkodra in 1485 within the settlement of Bazari Lepoviça in the nahiye of Petrishpan-ili. The settlement had thirty households, and amongst them were Mrija, son of Gashi, and Nikolla, son of Gashi. A certain Gjin Gashi is mentioned in the 1566–1574 Ottoman census of the Sanjak of Viçitrina, in one of the neighbourhoods of the mining town of Trepça. In 1602, a certain Marin Gashi was mentioned as being an old tribal chief in Mat. The first undisputed mention of the Gashi tribe in historical documents is believed to be in the reports of Don Vincenti and Benedetto Orsini in the years 1628–1629, which refer to a Mount Gashi. Robert Elsie emphasized that the Gashi were the first tribe that lived in the region of Tropojë.

The Gashi tribe and their origins were documented during a visit from Frang Bardhi to the villages of Pult in 1638. Bardhi recorded the village of Gash as one of the largest villages in Pult, with 97 houses and 866 Christian inhabitants. He stated that every household belonged to the Gashi, and that 95 people held the surname of Gashi, all belonging to three brothers who were all alive and knew their descendants up to the fourth generation. He also described the Gashi as being tall, strong-bodied and handsome, as well as quite wealthy and proud. They had a leader named Mengu Kola, who had welcomed him into his home as an honoured guest.

The Gashi tribe were continuously documented throughout the 17th century, when Gashi was the centre of the Diocese of Pult. Reports indicated that the Gashi and Krasniqja tribes were in frequent conflicts with one another until 1680, when Pjetër Bogdani managed to reconcile 24 blood feuds between the two tribes. In 1689, Gashi tribal leaders wrote a letter to the Vatican, asking for greater clerical and material support. This letter is one of the oldest documents in the Albanian language.

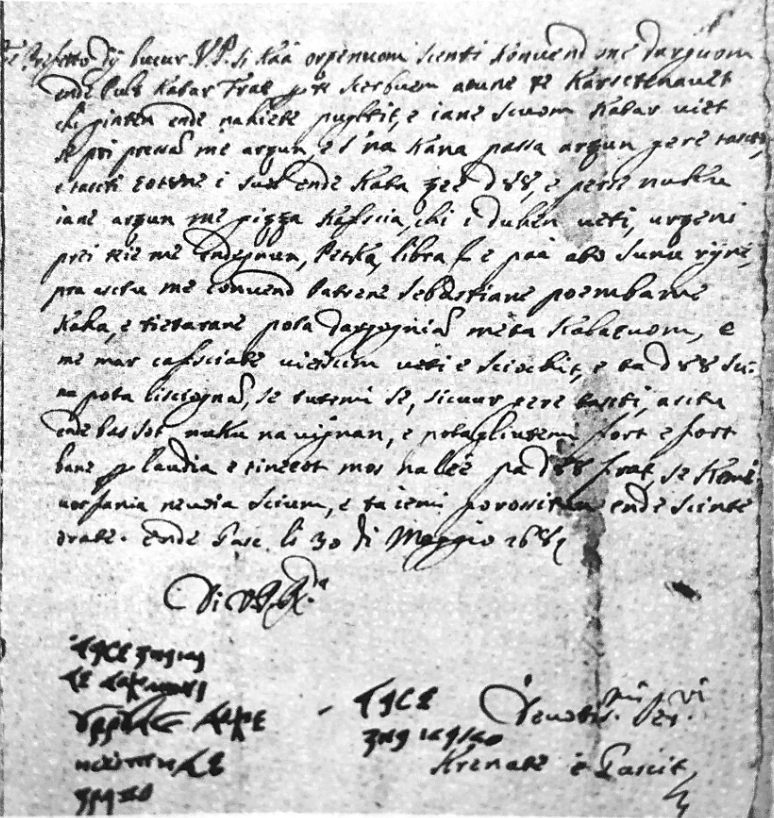
Letter from the Elders of Gashi (1689)

During the Austro-Turkish War of 1683–1699, the Gashi tribe were amongst the numerous Albanian tribes of the Sanjaks of Dukagjin (northern Albania and western Kosovo), Ohrid and the district of Montenegro who supported the Habsburgs and rebelled against the Ottomans. After the withdrawal of Habsburg forces from the region, the Ottomans made a list of tribes and regions which allied with the Habsburgs during the war in order to pacify them and ensure that they wouldn't attempt to rebel again; the Gashi were amongst the tribes that dominated the list, and were punished by the Ottomans as a result. In the years 1690–1693, the village of Gash was burned down by the Sanjakbey of Peja, and its population was expelled to the Llap region in Kosovo. Nonetheless, some families either returned to their original territories or escaped persecution, as in 1693–1697, the Gash villages of Luzhë and Botushë were recorded in documents.

In Serbian monastery documents, a certain Halil Pasha Gashi (Gašlija in Serbian) from the Gashi tribe is recorded as an Ottoman military commander in the late 17th century. Halil Pasha lead a force of approximately 15,000 soldiers, mostly recruited from members of the northern Albanian tribes, but also from the sanjaks of Elbasan, Ohrid, Vlora, and Delvina. He conducted significant campaigns in the Balkans, notably in towns such as Sofia, Niš, and Smederevo. During his campaigns, the defenders of Leskovac and Prokuplje retreated from their positions upon the advance of the Albanian army from Kosovo. Captain Antonije Znorić retreated from Prokuplje to Kruševac. Units under Halil Pasha of the Gashi (Serasker of Skopje), Mustafa Pasha Arnauti (Beglerbeg Rumelia), and the mercenaries of Mahmut Pasha of Begolli (Sanjakbeg of Prizren and Rrafshi i Dukagjinit), attacked immediately after their retreat, forcing their way into the vicinity of Leskovac and Prokuplje and causing the local population to flee.

=== Late Ottoman Period ===
In May 1845, following Reşid Pasha's outlawing of the right to bear arms, the Gashi, Krasniqi and Bytyçi tribes, along with 2,000 people from the Gjakova region, rose in revolt. The rebels, numbering to about 8,000 men, drove the Ottoman garrison out of Gjakova. The Ottomans suppressed the rebellion, but did not succeed in establishing effective control over the region. In 1862, the Ottomans sent Maxharr Pasha with 12 divisions to implement the Tanzimat Reforms in the Highlands of Gjakova. Under the leadership of Mic Sokoli and Binak Alia, the Gashi, Krasniqi, Bytyçi, Nikaj and Mërturi tribes organized a resistance near Bujan. The rebels were reinforced by the forces of the Shala tribe, led by Mark Lula. After heavy fighting, they managed to defeat the Ottoman force and expel them from the highlands. The Gashi tribe, led by Ali Ibra and Haxhi Brahimi, participated in the Battle of Nokshiq in Montenegro, in which the Albanian League of Prizren defeated a numerically superior Montenegrin force.

Sulejman Aga Batusha of Botushë was a chieftain of the Gashi tribe, acting as their leader in the Gjakova region during the early 20th century and participating in many uprisings against the Ottoman Empire.

During the Albanian uprising of 1912, the Gashi tribe joined the Krasniqi tribe (at this time led by Bajram Curri) as well as the Hasi and Bytyqi tribes in the battle of Prush Pass, near the Has region, where the Ottomans had left a garrison of four battalions. A bloody battle ensued, resulting in a heavy defeat for the Ottomans. The rebels obtained much of the Ottoman ammunition, arms, machine guns and cannons. There were hundreds of Ottoman casualties and prisoners of war captured by the Albanians. The Ottoman prisoners were disarmed and released, and were deceivingly told by their captors that the uprising was an attempt to free Albanian and Anatolian peasants from oppression - believing this, Gjakova's entire garrison was virtually demoralised upon their return to the town. This battle improved the morale of the Albanians in their movement for independence.

== Genetics ==
The ancestral lineage of the old Gashi tribe is identified as J2b-L283>Y126399>Y252971, whereas the newer Bardhaj and Shipshani branches are under E-V13>PH2180.

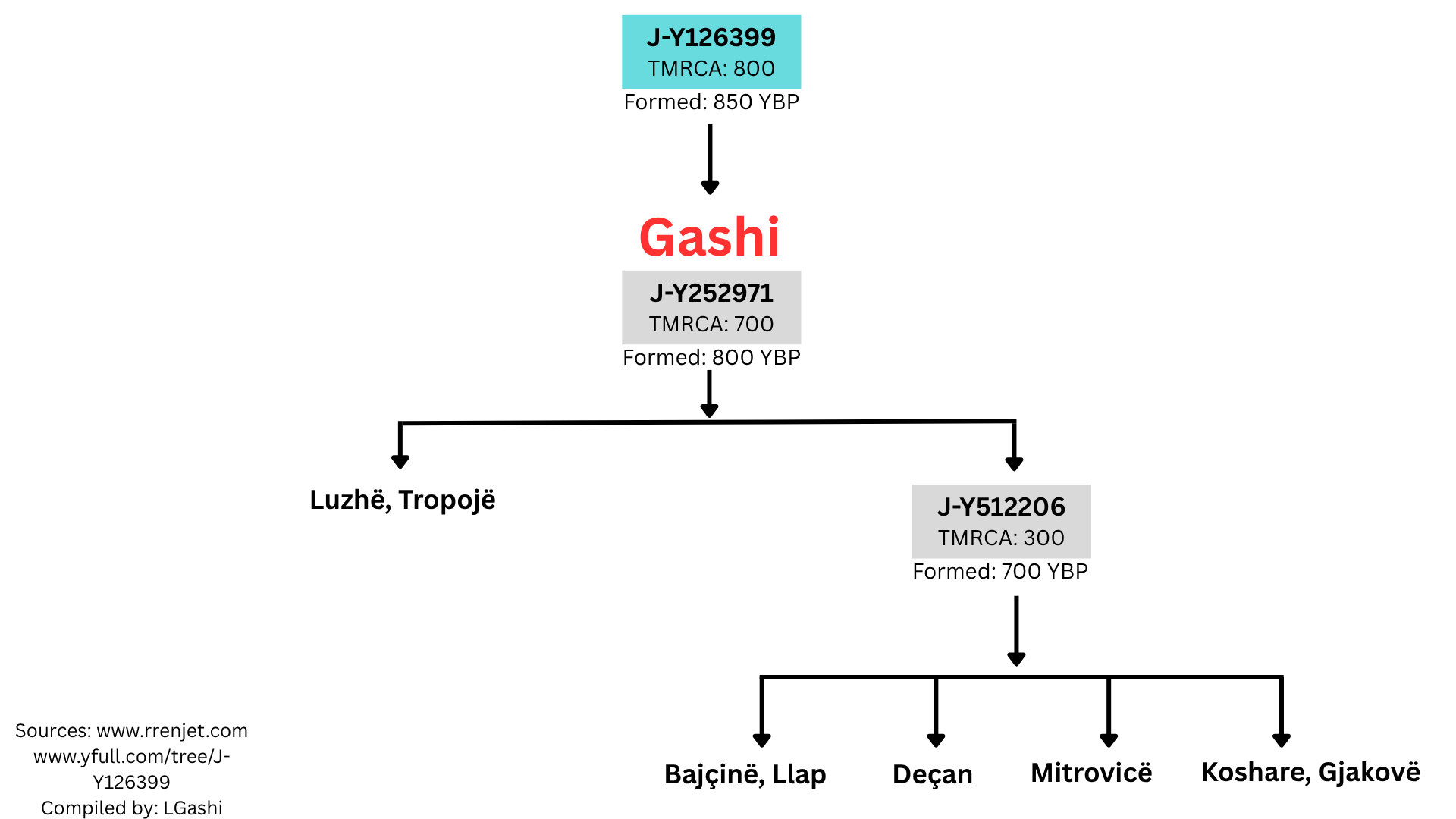
Paternal lineage tree of the Gashi tribe based on Y-DNA

The older Gashi brotherhoods share the same progenitor with the Krasniqi and the Nikaj ca. 1200 CE, as all three belong to the same branch haplogroup J2b-M241>L283. Their connection indicates that their lineage was present in its current location (Tropojë) in the Middle Ages. Meanwhile, up to now, all families from Bardhet and Shipshan brotherhoods are under E-V13>PH2180.

J-L283 is a Paleo-Balkan lineage which has been found in samples throughout the region from coastal Dalmatia (Bronze Age) to eastern Dardania (Roman era) as well as in Iron Age Daunians (Italy). It represents 14-18% of Albanian lineages. The oldest J-L283 sample in northern Albania is found in MBA Shkrel as early as the 19th century BCE. In northern Albania, IA Çinamak (Kukës County), half of the men carried J-L283.

E-V13, the most common European sub-clade of E1b1b1a (E-M78) represents about 1/3 of all Albanian men and peaks in Kosovo (~40%). The current distribution of this lineage might be the result of several demographic expansions from the Balkans, such as that associated with the Balkan Bronze Age, and more recently, during the Roman era with the so-called "rise of Illyrian soldiery".

== Distribution ==
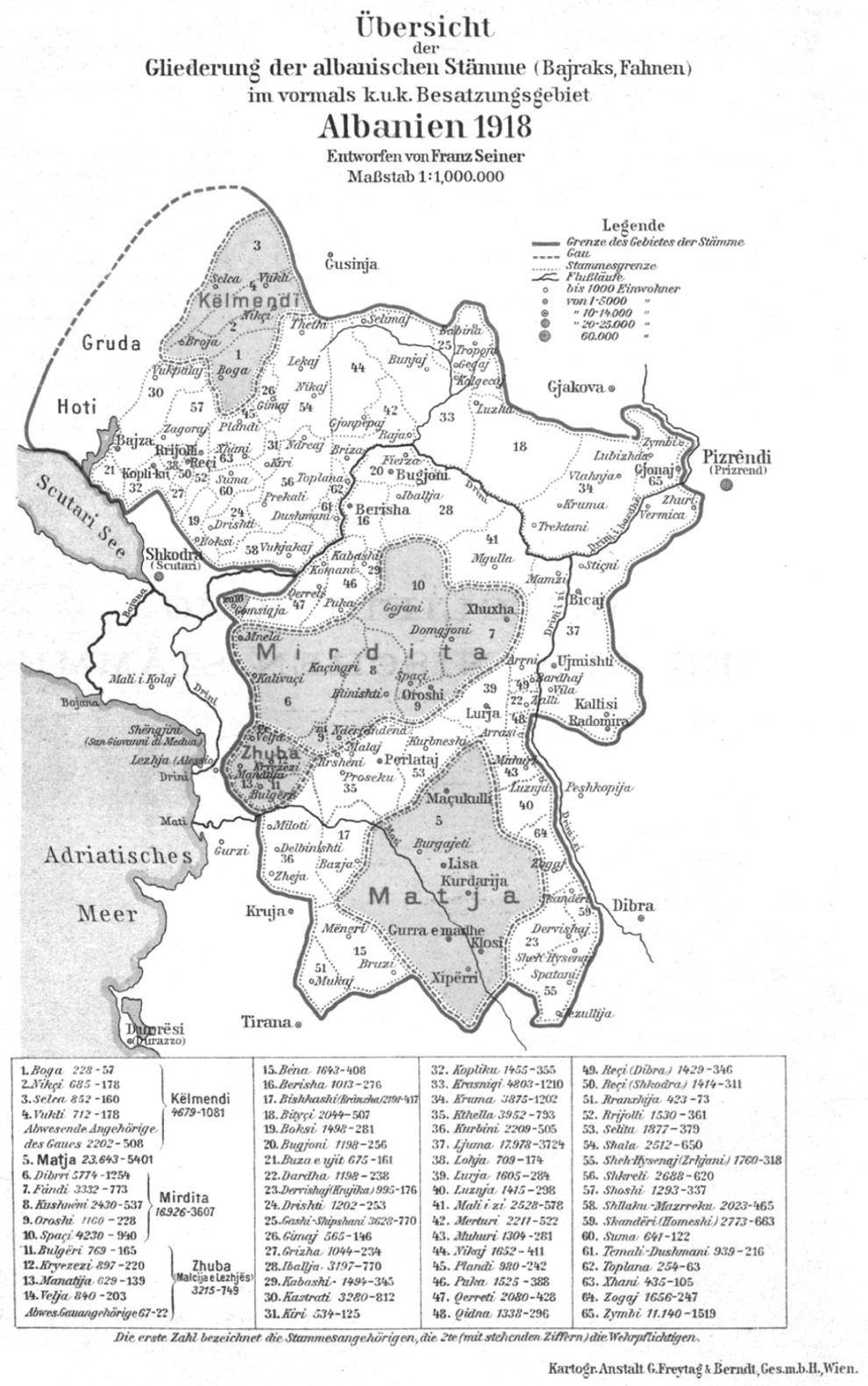
Map of tribes of northern Albania in 1918, Gashi covering section 25

Apart from their nucleus in the Highlands of Gjakova, brotherhoods and families stemming from the Gashi tribe are found in traditionally Albanian-inhabited territories in Kosovo, Serbia, North Macedonia and northern Albania. The Gashi tribe is present in every province of Kosovo, and some families identify as Gash i Gurit, whilst others identify simply as Gash. Many of the Gashi families in Kosovo preserve memories and origins from the Gjakova Highlands. Among the oldest data on the presence of the Gashi in Kosovo is the aforementioned report from 1697, which states: “The village of Gashi with 120 houses, which were evicted by the Pasha of Peja, are now located in the area of Kosovo, in a place called Llap, and have been living there for 8 years without priests and have begun to become Turkish (Muslim) and schismatic due to the lack of Catholic priests". Nonetheless, many other Gashi families in Kosovo do not have a tradition of descent from the Highlands of Gjakova. In some cases, families have forgotten their origins over the centuries, but in many cases, Albanian families who have historically inhabited Kosovo prior to the arrival of the Gashi tribe and joined them thereafter mistakenly claim descent from the tribe. Therefore, the Gashi tribal affiliation of Albanian families in Kosovo is not necessarily related to origins in northern Albania and could very well be local Albanian families that may in fact originate in Kosovo.

=== Relations with other tribes ===
The Gashi tribe was in conflict with the Shala tribe until they made peace in August 1879, based on the Sultan's order. The Gashi tribe regarded themselves as related to the Krasniqi in the sense that they both came from the west, and Baron Nopcsa recorded that the Gashi were originally related to the Toplana.

== Settlements ==
- Ahmataj (Shushicë-Ahmataj)
- Babina
- Begaj
- Berbat (Shkëlzen)
- Botushë
- Bukovë
- Buçin
- Degë
- Dushaj
- Gegaj
- Gri
- Jaho Salihi
- Kernaja
- Kovaç
- Luzha
- Mejdan
- Papaj
- Rajë
- Selimaj (Gegëhysen)
- Tropoja

== Notable people ==
- Sulejman Aga Batusha, resistance fighter and revolutionary leader of the Albanian National Awakening
- Sylejman Selimi, commander of KLA, politician
- Jashar Salihu, Hero of Kosovo recipient, Albanian diplomat, activist and general
- Ibrahim Gashi, Kosovar Albanian academic and philosopher
- Shkelzen Gashi, professional footballer
- Gashi, Albanian-American rapper

== Sources ==
- Elsie, Robert (30 May 2015). The Tribes of Albania: History, Society and Culture. I.B.Tauris. ISBN 978-1-78453-401-1.
- Fishta, Gjergj; Elsie, Robert (2005). The Highland Lute. I.B.Tauris. ISBN 978-1-84511-118-2.
- Kaser, Karl (2012). Household and Family in the Balkans: Two Decades of Historical Family Research at University of Graz. LIT Verlag Münster. ISBN 978-3-643-50406-7.
- Lauka, Alban; Muhaj, Ardian; Bojaxhi, Gjergj (2021). "Prejardhja e fiseve Krasniqe Nikaj nën dritën e të dhënave gjenetike, historike dhe traditës burimore [The origin of North Albanian tribes of Krasniqe and Nikaj based on Y-DNA phylogeny, historical data and oral tradition]" (PDF). Studime Historike. 3–4.
- Lazaridis, Iosif; Alpaslan-Roodenberg, Songül; et al. (26 August 2022). "The genetic history of the Southern Arc: A bridge between West Asia and Europe". Science. 377 (6609) eabm4247. Bibcode:2022Sci...377m4247L. doi:10.1126/science.abm4247. PMC 10064553. PMID 36007055.
