= Enis Bytyqi =

Kosovan footballer (born 1997)

Personal information
- Date of birth: 18 February 1997 (age 29)
- Place of birth: Dushanovë, FR Yugoslavia
- Height: 1.79 m (5 ft 10 in)
- Position: Forward

Team information
- Current team: 1. FC Magdeburg II
- Number: 30

Youth career
- 2006–2009: Burger BC 08
- 2009–2014: 1. FC Magdeburg
- 2014–2015: Werder Bremen

Senior career*
| Years | Team | Apps | (Gls) |
| 2015–2017 | Werder Bremen II | 49 | (8) |
| 2017–2019 | Würzburger Kickers | 20 | (2) |
| 2019–2020 | VfB Oldenburg | 18 | (9) |
| 2020–2022 | TSV Steinbach | 38 | (14) |
| 2025– | 1. FC Magdeburg II | 20 | (11) |

International career^{‡}
| 2014–2015 | Germany U18 | 2 | (0) |
| 2017 | Kosovo U21 | 4 | (2) |
- * Club domestic league appearances and goals as of 6 March 2026 ‡ National team caps and goals as of 15:19, 14 August 2021 (UTC)

Enis Bytyqi (born 18 February 1997) is a Kosovan professional footballer who plays as a forward for 1. FC Magdeburg II. Having made four appearances for the Germany U18 team, he represented Kosovo at U21 level.

== Early life ==
Bytyqi was born in Dushanovë near Prizren in former Yugoslavia to Albanian parents from Kosovo. At the age 2, he fled from the Kosovo War to Germany with his parents.

== Club career ==
=== Early career ===
Bytyqi started his youth career with Burger BC 08 in 2006 spending three years there. In 2009, he moved to 1. FC Magdeburg where he played for the under-17 side during the 2013–14 season scoring a hat-trick in the Junior Championship U17 relegation play-offs against Eintracht Norderstedt U17 side in a 5–1 away victory of his side. After scoring 45 goals in the U17 team's season, he caught the attention of major clubs and ended up signing for Werder Bremen in July 2014.

He started the season with under-19 side of Werder Bremen and scored the only goal in a 3–1 loss against Eintracht Braunschweig U-19. Then in the second game week he managed to score a hat-trick against Dynamo Dresden U-19 and his side won the match 5–2. He was a key player of the team playing 22 games as a starter in which he was substituted off on 9 occasions and scored 14 goals during the 2014–15 season.

=== Werder Bremen II ===
His impressive form during the first season with under-19 side made him to gain entry also with Werder Bremen II where he debuted for the side in the Regionalliga Nord on 14 February 2015 against Hannover 96 II coming on as a substitute in 84th minute in place of Maximilian Eggestein. After another game as a substitute a week later against VfR Neumünster, he scored his first goal for the side in his third match as a substitute on 10 May 2015 against Lüneburger SK Hansa, thereby saving them from defeat. A week later he played his first match as a starter and managed to score a hat-trick in a 7–0 victory over FT Braunschweig and scored twice the next week against BV Cloppenburg to give his side the 2–0 away victory. It was his last match for the regular season of Regionalliga as his side finished in the top of the table. Bytyqi participated with the side in a two-legged tie for play-off promotion against Borussia Mönchengladbach II where he played the full 90-minutes match in the 1st leg in a 0–0 draw; In the second leg he played as a starter but was substituted off in the 73rd minute for Florian Bruns as SV Werder Bremen II won 2–0 after extra-time and gained promotion to 3. Liga.

On 5 September 2015, Bytyqi made his professional debut in the 3. Liga against Preußen Münster coming on as a substitute in the 56th minute in place of Ousman Manneh.

He was released by Werder Bremen at the end of the 2016–17 season. In his two seasons in 3. Liga with the reserves he made 42 appearances scoring twice and making three assists.

=== Würzburger Kickers ===
In June 2017, Bytyqi joined 3. Liga side Würzburger Kickers signing a two-year contract.

=== VfB Oldenburg ===
On 22 August 2019, Regionalliga Nord side VfB Oldenburg announced that they had signed Bytyqi on a one-year deal.

=== TSV Steinbach Haiger ===
In July 2020, Bytyqi joined TSV Steinbach Haiger of the Regionalliga Südwest. He left the club after two years, after having torn his anterior cruciate ligament in February 2022.

=== 1. FC Magdeburg ===
After two major knee injuries and two-and-a-half years without a club, Bytyqi returned to his former club 1. FC Magdeburg in February 2025, being assigned to the club's reserves playing in the Oberliga. He suffered a knee injury on his debut in mid-March, coming off early in a 2–1 win against VfL Halle 96.

== International career ==
=== Germany ===
==== Under-18 ====
Bytyqi played four games for the Germany U18 team from December 2014 until April 2015. On 17 December 2014, Bytyqi made his debut starting in a friendly match against United States U18.

=== Kosovo ===
==== Under-21 ====
On 29 August 2017, Bytyqi received a call-up from Kosovo U21 for a 2019 UEFA European Under-21 Championship qualification matches against Norway U21 and Germany U21, making his debut after being named in the starting line-up and scoring two goals in a 3–2 win.

== Career statistics ==
=== Club ===
As of 1 July 2024

Appearances and goals by club, season and competition
| Club | Season | League | | | DFB-Pokal | | Europe | | Total | |
| Club | Season | Division | Apps | Goals | Apps | Goals | Apps | Goals | Apps | Goals |
|---|---|---|---|---|---|---|---|---|---|---|
| Werder Bremen II | 2014–15 | Regionalliga Nord | 7 | 6 | — | | — | | 7 | 6 |
| Werder Bremen II | 2015–16 | 3. Liga | 18 | 1 | — | | — | | 18 | 1 |
| Werder Bremen II | 2016–17 | 3. Liga | 24 | 1 | — | | — | | 24 | 1 |
| Werder Bremen II | Total | | 49 | 8 | 0 | 0 | 0 | 0 | 49 | 8 |
| Würzburger Kickers | 2017–18 | 3. Liga | 18 | 2 | 1 | 0 | — | | 19 | 2 |
| Würzburger Kickers | 2018–19 | 3. Liga | 2 | 0 | 0 | 0 | — | | 2 | 0 |
| Würzburger Kickers | Total | | 20 | 2 | 1 | 0 | 0 | 0 | 21 | 2 |
| VfB Oldenburg | 2019–20 | Regionalliga Nord | 18 | 9 | 0 | 0 | — | | 18 | 9 |
| TSV Steinbach Haiger | 2020–21 | Regionalliga Südwest | 25 | 9 | 1 | 0 | — | | 26 | 9 |
| TSV Steinbach Haiger | 2021–22 | Regionalliga Südwest | 13 | 5 | 0 | 0 | — | | 13 | 5 |
| TSV Steinbach Haiger | Total | | 38 | 14 | 1 | 0 | 0 | 0 | 39 | 14 |
| Career total | | | 125 | 33 | 2 | 0 | 0 | 0 | 127 | 33 |
