= Botushë =

Botushë: Botushë (Albanian); Батуша/Batuša (Serbian)
- Village
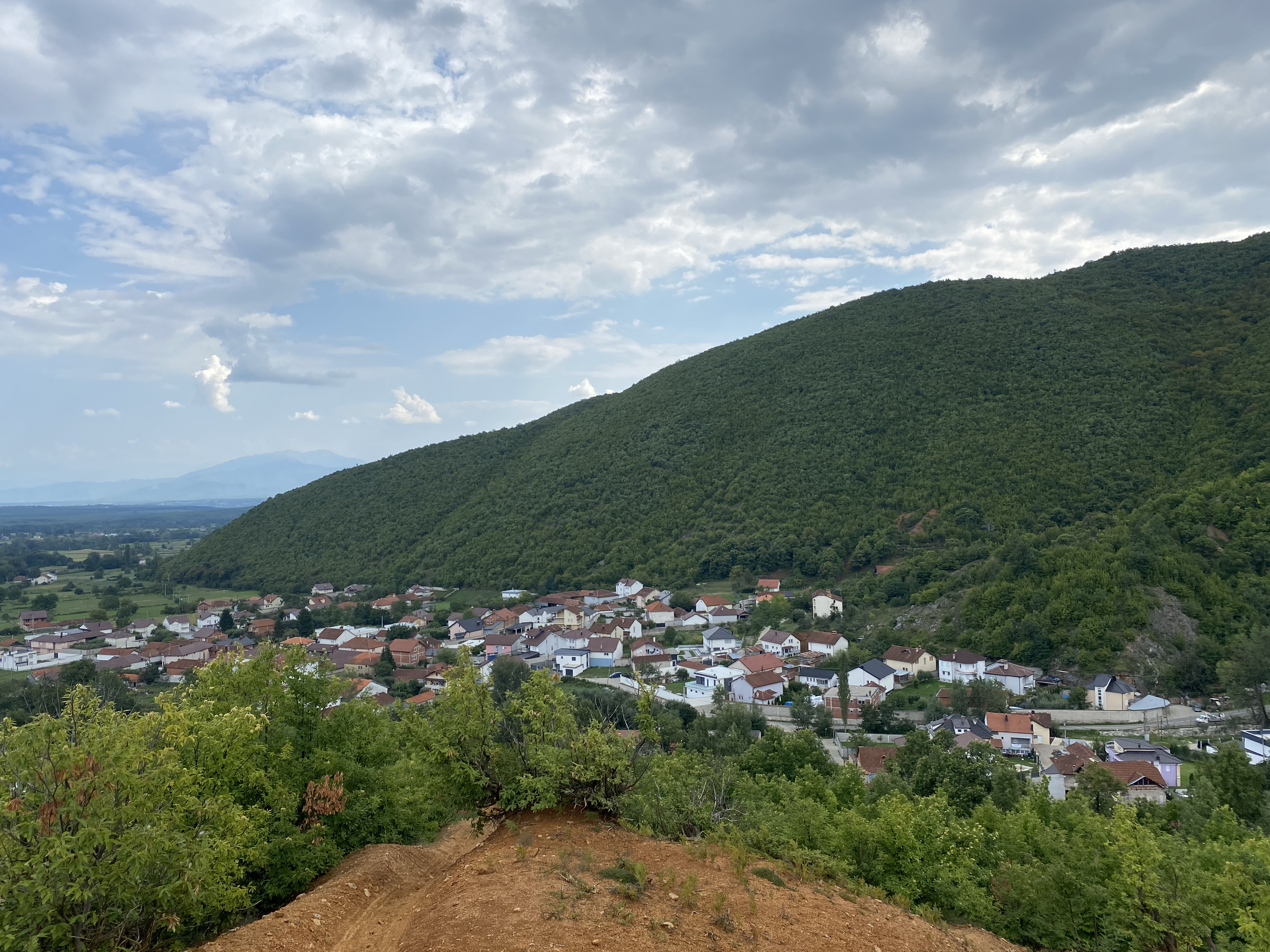
- Photo of Botushë from its northern side, 2022.

- Location within Kosovo
- Coordinates: 42°27′14″N 20°15′39″E
- Country: Kosovo
- District: Gjakova
- Municipality: Gjakova
- Elevation: 508 m (1,667 ft)

Population (2024)
  - Total: 584
- Time zone: UTC+1 (Central European Time)
  - Summer (DST): UTC+2 (CEST)
- Website: https://www.botusha.li/

Botushë (Albanian: Botushë/Batushë; Serbian: Батуша/Batuša) is a village in the municipality of Gjakova, District of Gjakova, southwest Kosovo. It is located near the border with Albania and is part of both the Highlands of Gjakova and Reka e Keqe. It is inhabited exclusively by Albanians.

== Etymology ==
The two forms of this toponym, 'Botushë' and 'Batushë', contain the Albanian reducing suffix -ushë. Amongst the local population, 'Batushë' is favoured. The toponym with an 'a' is related to the Illyro-Dardanian Batoni, an anthroponym of the royal Dardanian family, whereas 'o' would suggest a link with the Albanian 'botë' which means 'earth, land'. This indicates that the toponym most likely derives from Albanian.

== Geography ==
Botushë is situated north-west of Gjakova in the historical ethnographic regions of the Gjakova Highlands and Reka e Keqe. It is cradled near the Accursed Mountains and is positioned on both banks of the Gusha stream. It is located in the tribal territory of the Gashi tribe – which lies in the historical region of the Highlands of Gjakova (Albanian: Malësia e Gjakovës) – and is inhabited by the members of the aforementioned tribe. It is 23 km away from Gjakova and 3 km away from Junik.

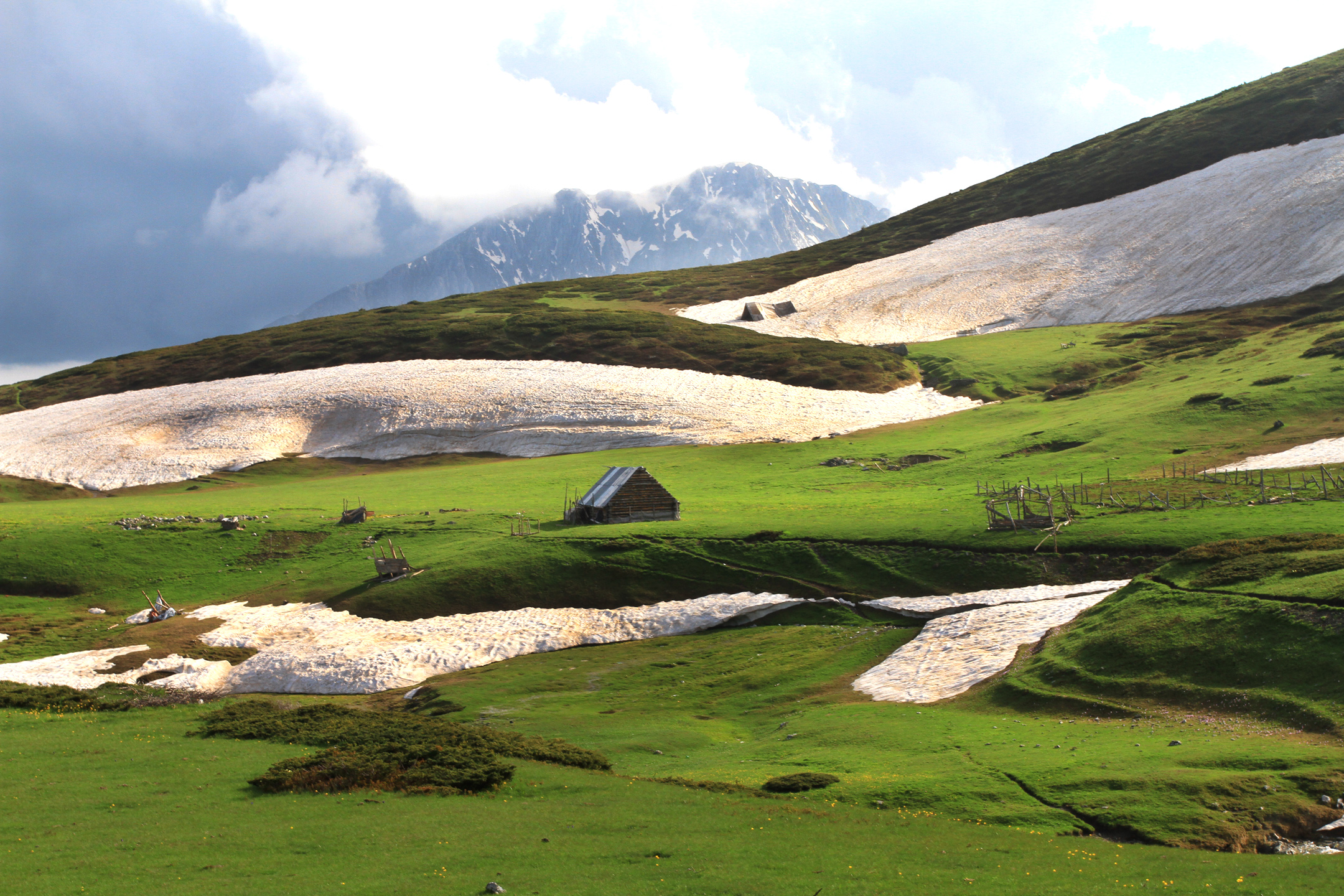
End of the winter pictured in the mountains near Botushë

== History ==
Prehistoric findings have been found on the territory of the village, as well as findings that date back to the Roman period and the Middle Ages – they have been proposed for listing as one of the Monuments of Kosovo. The kulla of Adem Ademaj dates back to the 18th or 19th century, and is on the list. Additionally, the kulla of Rexh Uka, which dates back to the 19th century, is proposed for classification on the same list.

Botushë itself is an old settlement with a well documented history. There are many old Albanian toponyms, such as the following: Fusha e Kishës (The Church's Field), Lluga e Mel Kurtit, Qyteza e Poshtme (Lower Citadel), Qyteza e Epërme (Upper Citadel), Arrabregu (Walnut Hill), Kokorri, Fusha e Mar (k) Bushës (Mark Busha's Field), Kalaja e Jerinës (Jerina Castle), Kalaja e Madhe (Great Castle), Kalaja e Vogël (Little Castle), Shkoza (hornbeam), Shpella e Çelisë (Cave of Çeli), Prroni i Çelisë, Shpati i Valës (Vala's Slope), Arza, Livadhi i Boçit (Boçi's Meadow), Koteci, Kodra Tabe (Tabe Hill) etc. These toponyms reveal that Botushë has possibly been a historically fortified place; the prehistoric layer is seen in Jerina Castle, above Botushë, in the place called Shkozë just southwest of the village. The unexplored Cave of Çeli is nearby, and the cases of Late Antiquity belong to the Great Castle and the Little Castle.

=== Middle ages ===
Prior to Ottoman rule and during the time of the Kingdom of Serbia, Botushë was part of the Reka (River) župa, named as such after the Erenik river that flows through it. According to the Dečani chrysobulls of the 1330s CE, the Dečani monastery had a tenure in Reka župa of 4 villages and 3 hamlets, including Botushë. Emperor Stefan Dušan had given the village of Botushë, along with the Church of St. Nicholas which was located in the village, to the monastery as property. Entire Albanian villages and churches were gifted by Serbian kings, particularly Stefan Dušan, as tribute to the Serbian monasteries of Deçan, Prizren and Tetova for economic utilisation, and many of Kosovo's Catholic churches were seized by Serbian Kings for this purpose. During the 1330s CE, Botushë was recorded as having 7 households and 15 males.

The inhabitants of Botushë during the late 15th century were Albanian Christians of the Orthodox rite with a Catholic minority. In the Ottoman defter of 1485, Botushë was part of the Nahiye of Altun-Ili, which encompassed the plain between Gjakova and Junik and was inhabited predominantly by Albanians who engaged primarily in agriculture and the rearing of livestock. In this defter, Botushë is recorded with 35 households and 15 unmarried men, and although some were mentioned with characteristically Albanian names such as Ulku, the majority had names belonging to the Slavic Orthodox sphere. Members of the same family would have mixed Albanian-Slavic names, such as in the case of Nenko, son of Leka. A large part of the anthroponomy shows a degree of slavicisation, and many of these traditionally Slavic Orthodox names were also used by Albanians, indicating that these same Slavic Orthodox names are not typically indicators of a Slavic ethnic origin.

Following the Ottoman conquest of the region, Princess Milica of Serbia successfully advocated for the return of Botushë and the surrounding villages as property to the Dečani Monastery from Ottoman control.

=== Ottoman period ===
According to local legend, the Gashi tribe took its current form when the Aga of the Gashi in Botushë united the Luzha brotherhood with the brotherhoods and bajraks of Bardhi and Shipshan as a protective measure against the surrounding tribes, who were bigger in number. Also according to legend, the villages of Botusha and Luzha are the only two settlements in the Gjakova Highlands where the Albanian population of the older Gashi tribe - who initially lived in Pult in the 17th century - continues to live. Due to their constant resistance against Ottoman rule, the Gashi tribe were repeatedly punished via military expeditions, which led to the departure of the population from their initial settlements and a gradual conversion to Islam in the years 1690–1743. In Botusha and Deçan, about 10-11 generations of ancestors with Muslim names are remembered, while the previous generations are remembered with Catholic names. Both Luzha and Botusha are mentioned by Catholic priests who visited some villages beyond the Diocese of Pulati in 1693–1694.

Local Albanian leaders, such as Sulejman Aga of Botushë, who was a chieftain of the Gashi tribe and their leader in the Gjakova region during the early 20th century, organised resistance and movements for independence against the Ottomans throughout the 19th-20th centuries; in one such uprising, 5,000-6,000 Albanian fighters led by Sulejman Aga Batusha gathered outside of Gjakova and attacked the garrison in an attempt to enter the city.

In 1904, 10 Ottoman battalions accompanied by artillery were sent to Gjakova in order to quell the uprising. Shemsi Pasha and the Ottoman troops were then ordered to estimate the livestock possessions and to enforce heavy taxes upon the local Albanians in response to the uprising. The hostilities were accompanied by the forcible collection of taxes from the local population and the destruction of entire villages in the Gjakova region by Ottoman forces. When he arrived in Botushë, Shemsi Pasha, with five battalions and numerous artillery pieces, began bombarding the village. The Ottomans were met by 300 Albanian resistance fighters led by Sulejman Aga Batusha. The resistance fighters lost 35 dead or wounded men, whilst the Ottomans lost more than 80 soldiers. Another 300 Albanian fighters arrived and surrounded the Ottoman force but could not yet finish them as the Ottomans were numerically-superior and were positioned well with artillery. 2,000 Albanian tribesmen would eventually gather to fight the Turks, and the Ottoman government sent 18 more battalions accompanied by artillery to quell this new uprising; Shkup's Vali, Shakir Pasha, also went to Gjakova. A series of ensuing battles followed in the Gjakova region, resulting in the deaths of more than 900 Ottoman soldiers as well as 2 bimbashis and a dozen officers, whereas the Albanians suffered only 170 dead or wounded. Shakir Pasha was thereby ordered to stand down.

Sulejman Aga Botusha was a prominent local leader and patriotic resistance fighter, and had worked with Isa Boletini as a protector of Albanian interests and rights, as well as a leader of the local movements for independence and resistance against the Ottomans.

During the First Balkan War, Bajram Curri and his small force managed to push the Serbs across Morina Pass (Qafa e Morinës), and his troops entered the villages of Botushë, Molliq and Ponoshec. They could not continue as Radomir Vešović would reinforce the Serbs with 12,000 new troops in order to subdue the region with numeric superiority. Azem Galica's band of resistance fighters passed through Botushë and Glloxhan in order to get to the Highlands of Gjakova. Botushë was part of the Neutral Zone of Junik.

Botushë has been the home of many Albanian resistance fighters, such as the aforementioned Sulejman Aga Botusha, Jashar Salihu – a Hero of Kosovo recipient and prominent figure in the Kosovo War – and Islam Aga. Islam Aga was a noteworthy fighter of the League of Prizren and one of the leaders of the force that killed Mehmed Ali Pasha at Abdullah Pashë Dreni's kulla. Islam Aga slew 28 Turks before being killed by cannon fire in his final battle.

=== Kosovo War ===
During the Kosovo War, the village was severely affected. 159 out of a total of 179 houses were completely destroyed by Serbian forces. The local mosque was also damaged and destroyed. There is a plaque for those who lost their lives during that period within the village, and it includes names, pictures and the date of their deaths. The inscription on the plaque reads:

Albanian original

Qëndroni Krenarë
Vështrojeni Kosovën Martirë
Të Lirë Që Aq Shumë e Deshët
Jeni Të Pavdekshëm
Gëzojeni Lirinë Në Përjetsi

English Translation

Stay Proud
Look at Kosovo, Martyrs
Free, as you so wanted it
You are all immortal
Enjoy freedom in eternity

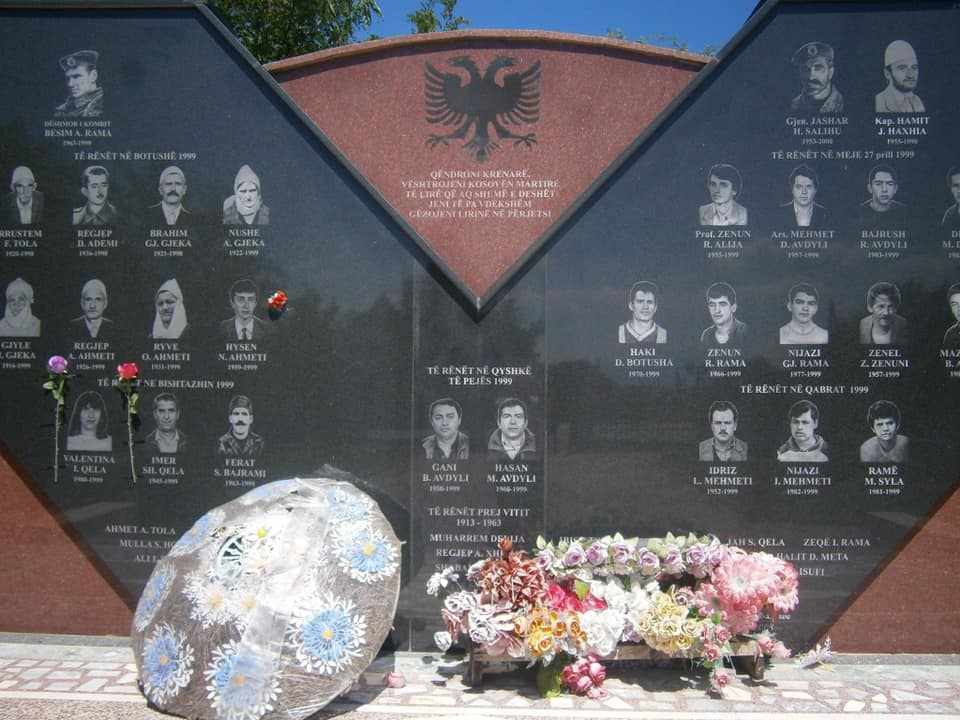
Botushë Plaque dedicated to those who died during the Kosovo War.

== Notable figures ==
- Jashar Salihu – Hero of Kosovo recipient, Albanian diplomat, activist and general.
- Islam Aga – League of Prizren fighter, distinguished for his courage, slew 28 Turks in battle before being killed by cannon fire.
- Sulejman Agë Botusha – Albanian patriot, renowned resistance fighter, prominent local leader. Resistance leader in the battle of February 12, 1904 between Ottoman forces and Albanian resistance fighters.

== Sources ==
Haxhija, Arif (2013). Dritat e gjerdanit të lirisë kombëtare. Gjakova: Blini BK. p. 216.
