= Sulejman Aga Batusha =

Commander and Chieftain of the Gashi Tribe Sulejman Aga Batusha
- Born: 19th Century; Botushë, Kosovo
- Military career
- Branch: Albanian guerrillas
- Rank: Commander and Chieftain of the Gashi Tribe
- Conflicts: Albanian Revolt (1910); Albanian Revolt (1912)

Sulejman Aga Batusha or Sulejman Aga Botusha was a prominent Albanian resistance fighter and revolutionary leader from the Highlands of Gjakova and the wider Gjakova region who participated in the Albanian National Awakening. Born sometime in the 19th century, Sulejman Aga would repeatedly lead Albanian forces against the Ottomans throughout the 19th and 20th centuries, ultimately contributing to the Albanian Declaration of Independence from the Ottoman Empire. He was also a chief of the Gashi tribe and was their head in the Gjakova region.

== History ==
Sulejman Aga hailed from the village of Botushë, a village in the Gjakova Highlands that is situated in the present-day District of Gjakova in Kosovo. He organised resistance movements against the Ottomans throughout the 19th-20th centuries; in one such uprising, he gathered 5,000-6,000 Albanian fighters outside of Gjakova and attacked the garrison in an attempt to enter the city. In 1904, 10 Ottoman battalions accompanied by artillery were sent to Gjakova in order to quell the uprising, and were subsequently tasked with enforcing harsh taxes on the local Albanian population as retribution; the hostilities were accompanied by the forcible collection of taxes from the local population and the destruction of entire villages in the Gjakova region by Ottoman forces. Upon arriving to Botusha on 12 February 1904, Shemsi Pasha, accompanied by five battalions and multiple artillery pieces, began bombarding the village. Sulejman Aga led 300 Albanian resistance fighters against the Ottomans, and his forces would suffer 35 dead or wounded, whereas the Ottomans lost more than 80 soldiers. Sulejman's forces were bolstered by another 300 Albanian fighters that surrounded the Ottoman force but could not yet finish them as the Ottomans were numerically superior and were well-positioned with artillery. Eventually, 2,000 Albanian tribesmen gathered to fight the Turks, and the Ottoman government sent 18 more battalions accompanied by artillery against this force. The Gjakova region saw a series of ensuing battles resulting in the deaths of more than 900 Ottoman soldiers as well as 2 bimbashis and a dozen officers, whereas the Albanians only suffered 170 dead or wounded. Shakir Pasha was thereby ordered to stand down.

A close collaborator and ally of Isa Boletini, Sulejman Aga was one of the leaders and main participants of the Uprising of 1910 after meeting with fellow Albanian leaders (such as Isa Boletini, Idriz Seferi and Hasan Prishtina) at Verrat e Llukës in Deçan, where they gave their Besa to fight the Ottomans. As a result of his involvement, his kulla was burnt down. However, due to the fact that the uprising had ultimately been unsuccessful, Sulejman Aga, along with other Albanian resistance leaders, spent some time in Montenegro.

In 1911, it was recorded that Sulejman Aga was back in Botushë, and that Ottoman authorities had unsuccessfully tried to force him to hand over his weapons on multiple occasions. Later that year, Sulejman Aga accepted an amnesty from the Ottomans. By 1912, Sulejman Aga had once again formed a large band of Albanian resistance fighters that supported the plundering of the Ottoman military depots in Gjakova and Prizren. When Gjilan was liberated on 28 July 1912 after Ottoman forces were crushed outside the city, the Albanian rebels were welcomed with open arms by the local inhabitants. Of these 2,000 Albanian rebels, 250 were men from the Gjakova region led by Sulejman Aga himself.

== Legacy ==
Sulejman Aga is remembered in folk songs as a hero, and was described as a tall and thin man.
