= Pac, Albania =

Pac
- Village
- Location within Albania
- Coordinates: 42.2892°N 20.2102°E
- Country: Albania
- County: Kukës
- Municipality: Tropojë
- Time zone: UTC+1 (CET)
  - Summer (DST): UTC+2 (CEST)

Pac is a village located in the administrative territorial entity of Bytyç, belonging to the municipality of Tropojë, in northern Albania.
