= Hysen Bytyqi =

Kosovan scientist

- Born: 5 October 1968 (age 57); Pristina, Kosovo
- Education: University of Pristina; Agricultural University of Tirana
- Known for: Introducing animal breeding to Kosovo
- Scientific career
- Fields: Agricultural science, Animal science, Animal breeding
- Workplaces: University of Pristina&lt; Food and Agriculture Organization (FAO)

Hysen Bytyqi (born 5 October 1968) is a Kosovo agricultural scientist who introduced animal breeding to Kosovo. He is professor of animal science and pro-rector of education and student matters at the University of Pristina

== Biography ==
Bytyqi was born on 5 October 1968 in Pristina. After studying agriculture, Bytyqi was in 1994 chairman of the regional Agricultural Society Malisheva which encompassed 45 communities and continued in this position until 1999. In parallel he studied at the Agricultural Faculty of Pristina University and obtained, in 1991, the Agricultural Diploma in animal science.

In 1999 and 2000 Bytyqi was the national representative of the Food and Agriculture Organization (FAO) as Kosovan consultant. He was responsible for the project "Agriculture 1998", and was involved in the planning and distribution of seed supplies and agricultural goods for 1400 farmers in Kosovo. From 2000 to 2003 Bytyqi was responsible for the project "Farm Reconstruction" (EFRP) in the same organisation (FAO), a million dollar project with the goal of providing farmers with livestock and machines, together with modern veterinary services, and to build up the administrative organisation after the war in Kosovo. In parallel Bytygi studied at the Agricultural University of Tirana and in 2003 obtained his master's degree in animal breeding there.

== Research areas ==
- National contact person for project: Unification and Improving of Selection of Domestic Animals in South Eastern Europe. Norway, Noragric, SEE Programme in Agriculture;
- National contact person for project: Identification and Conservation of Animal Genetic Resources in South Eastern Europe Norway, Noragric, SEE Programme in Agriculture;
- National contact person. Regional network about animal genetic resources in the Balkan, coordinated by "Save the foundation", Switzerland.
- Implementation of research project about "Lacaune" sheep breed in Kosovo. Cooperation project between the Faculty of Agriculture and Veterinary and USAID.
- National project coordinator: "Cooperation in academic, scientific and professional fields between Faculty of Agriculture & Veterinary in Pristina and University of Natural Resources and Applied Life Sciences, Vienna", specifically Project No. 4: Project Title: "Breeding program for sheep farmers in Kosovo".
- National project coordinator: Mineral improved food and feed crops for human and animal health. Programme in Higher Education, Research and Development in the Western Balkans 2010–2013 the Agriculture Sector (HERD/Agriculture) Project Application Form (Project contact person for Faculty of Agriculture and veterinary).
- National project coordinator: Study of autochthon cattle "BUSHA" in Kosovo. Application for special research funds from the Ministry of Education Science and Technology (MEST) - Project submitted.
- National project coordinator: Kosovo Milk Safety and Quality Assessment - Risks Associated with Smallholder Farms. Project is in cooperation with University of Pristina – Faculty of Agriculture and Veterinary and University of Wisconsin and University of Minnesota, USA. 2014. Hysen Bytyqi – Project Coordinator: Study of Buffalo Milk in Kosova. Application for special research funds from the Ministry of Education Science and Technology (MEST).
- Feasibility study for production and application of insect frass. This project is jointly financed by the German Federal Ministry for Economic Cooperation and Development (BMZ) and the European Union (EU), #Digital4Business is being implemented by GIZ Kosovo in the framework of the #Digital Transformation Center in the Innovation and Training Park (ITP) Prizren.
- Towards sustainable management and use of organic wastes in Kosovo: Basic and applied research in the municipality of Viti. Joint project University of Prishtina – Faculty of Agriculture and Veterinary in Kosovo – University of Giessen in Germany, District of Kirchhain in Germany, and Municipality of Vitia in Kosovo. Funded by Federal Ministry of Education and Research (Bundesministerium für Bildung und Forschung) in Germany

== Research engagements ==
- Regional Network for the Animal Genetic Resources in the Balcans, Foundation Switzerland
- Animal Breeding and Farm management, Swiss College of Agriculture – Bern
- Regional Meeting: Branding of the Products and Regions. International Conference Center in Leipzig-Zschortau, Germany
- Animal Breeding and statistic modeling of survival, productive and reproductive traits of dual-purpose cattle, milk test day model. Animal Science and Aquaculture, University of Life Sciences, Norway
- Training about the "Mary Carry" programs
- Training about research and development initiatives (Leoben-Austria; Sapienza-Italy; Oxford-UK)
- Cost action: CA20133 Cross-border transfer and development of sustainable resource recovery strategies towards zero waste (fullreco4us).
- Cost action: CA21125 A European forum for revitalisation of marginalised mountain areas (MARGISTAR)
- Cost action: CA22112 European Network on Livestock Phenomics (EU-LI-PHE)
- Cost action: CA22134 Sustainable Network for agrofood loss and waste prevention, management, quantification and valorisation (FoodWaStop).

== Literature ==
- Manfred G. Raupp Hrsg: The fight against malaria and other related mosquito-born diseases : results and proposed next steps of the Rotary Seminar at the University Prishtina (Kosovo), ICC Deutschland Türkei, Rotary International 2019 ISBN 978-3-945046-16-6
