= Alshina =

Summit in Albania

- Maja e Alshinës
- Location within Albania

Highest point
- Elevation: 2,295 m (7,530 ft)
- Prominence: 119 m (390 ft)
- Isolation: 1.1 km (0.68 mi)
- Coordinates: 42°22′28″N 19°57′09″E

Geography
- Country: Albania
- Region: Albanian Alps
- Municipality: Tropojë
- Parent range: Accursed Mountains

Geology
- Mountain type: summit
- Rock type: limestone

Alshina is a summit in the Accursed Mountains, located within Tropojë municipality, in northern Albania. Rising to an elevation of 2,295 m (7,530 ft) above sea level, it dominates the central section of Valbona Valley.

== Geology ==
Forming part of Mali i Hekurave massif, Alshina's rugged relief is characterized by limestone bedrock, sinkholes, rocky outcrops and other karst features typical of the region. Its summit offers unobstructed, 360-degree views of numerous nearby peaks and valleys, including Curraj i Epërm, Maja e Kakisë, Maja e Boshit, Gavni, Svoja and Maja e Dhive.

== Climbing route ==
The most frequently used ascent route begins in the village of Dragobi, near the Mutina Gorge. From there, the path leads through the summer pastures known as Stanet e Mutinës and continues toward Droca Gorge, where the final climb to the summit begins.

Parts of the route are unmarked and traverse uneven karst terrain, with alternating ascents and descents across rocky depressions. A small lake is located near the summit area. The hike covers approximately 25 km round trip, with an elevation gain of about 2,100 meters. The ascent typically takes around seven hours, while the descent requires about five hours.

== See also ==
- List of mountains in Albania
