= Maranaj =

Mountain in Albania

- Mali i Maranajt
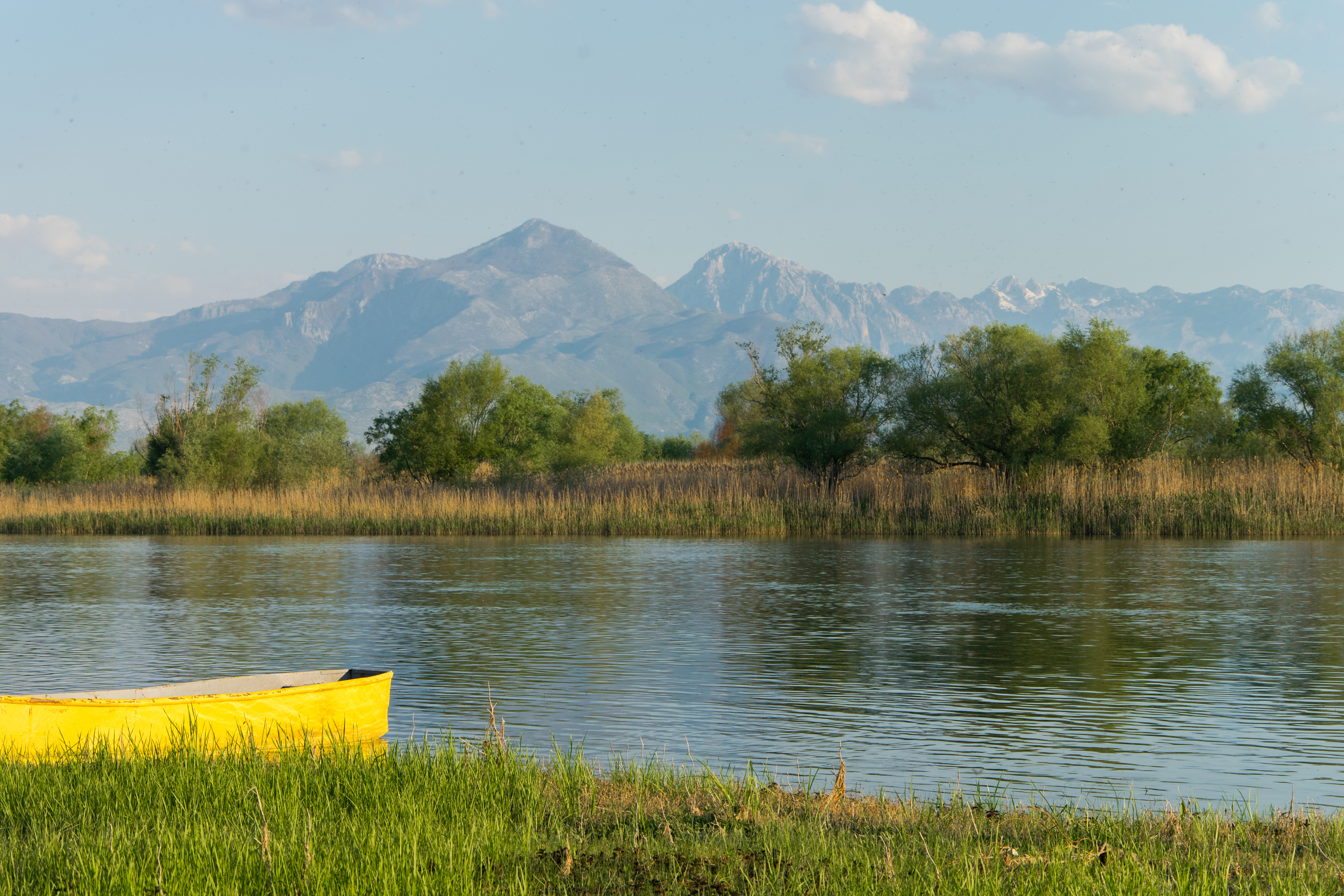
- Lake Shkodër with Maranaj on the background

Highest point
- Elevation: 1,576 m (5,171 ft)
- Prominence: 235 m (771 ft)
- Isolation: 4.8 km (3.0 mi)
- Coordinates: 42°11′28″N 19°35′49″E

Geography
- Location within Albania
- Country: Albania
- Region: Albanian Alps
- Municipality: Shkodër
- Parent range: Maranaj–Biga e Gimajve

Geology
- Mountain type: mountain
- Rock type(s): limestone, schist

Maranaj is a mountain in northern Albania, located northeast of Shkodër, forming part of the outer layer of the Albanian Alps. Rising to about 1,576 m (5,171 ft), it marks the southern threshold of the highland tribal region of Malësia.

== Geography ==
Maranaj is an elongated limestone massif with two main summits, the higher of which hosts a trigonometric survey point. The mountain dominates the surrounding landscape between the Kir River valley to the south and southeast and the plains of Vrakë to the north and west. The settlement of Vorfaç (Vorfaj), divided into Lower and Upper Vorfaç, occupies the southwestern slopes, roughly between 110 m and 720 m above sea level.

The mountain forms part of the transitional arc linking the Albanian Alps with the lower karst plateaus surrounding Shkodër.

== Geology ==
Maranaj consists primarily of limestone, with extensive exposures of schist on its eastern and southeastern slopes. Karst landforms are widespread, including karren fields, dolines and large accumulations of limestone blocks.

Distinct lithological transitions between limestone and schist are evident at the saddles of Qafa e Drinasës and Qafa e Domnit, where erosion has produced steep slopes, narrow passes and small karst cavities. To the south, the relief descends abruptly into the Kir River gorge, with conglomerates and deeply incised drainage channels present.

== Biodiversity ==
The mountain displays clear altitudinal vegetation belts, ranging from Mediterranean shrubs and trees on the lower slopes, to scattered oak and hornbeam stands at mid elevations. Higher up, extensive beech forests and mountain pastures alternate and on the summit, open grasslands and karst clearings support a diverse herbaceous flora.

The rocky limestone terrain is home to reptile species typical of northern Albania, including vipers, which are frequently mentioned in early scientific literature.

== Tribal history ==
Historically, Maranaj lay within a region defined by tribal organization and blood feuds, which deeply influenced settlement patterns and seasonal land use. In the late 19th and early 20th centuries, periods of inner conflict led to the abandonment of pastures and alpine huts, despite the high quality of grazing land.

European explorers and naturalists have described Maranaj as a “sentinel” of the Albanian Alps, both a physical and symbolic gateway into the highland tribal territories.

== See also ==
- List of mountains in Albania
