= Maja e Kakisë =

Summit in Albania

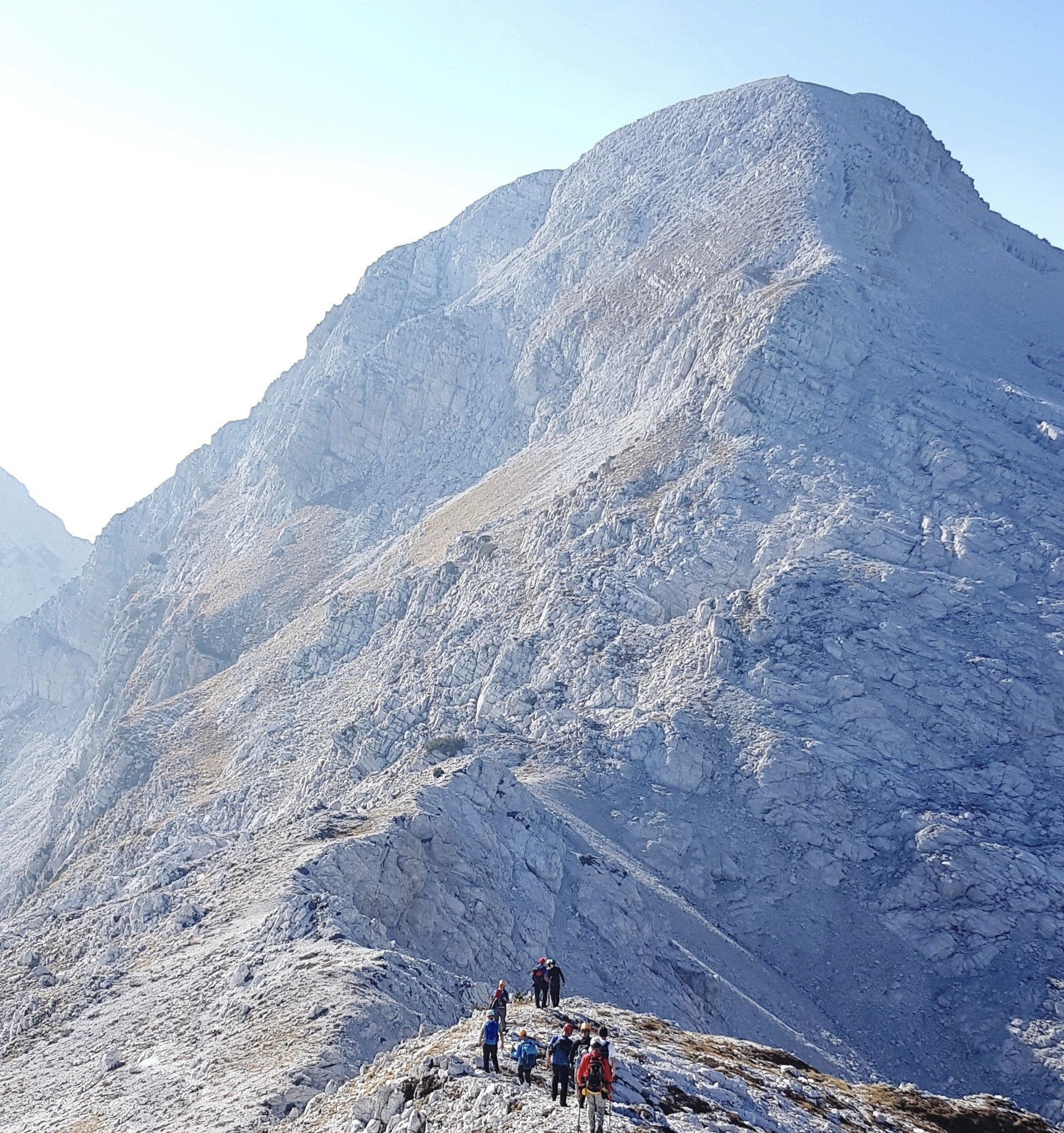

Highest point
- Elevation: 2,359 m (7,740 ft)
- Prominence: 506 m (1,660 ft)
- Isolation: 4.8 km (3.0 mi)
- Coordinates: 42°20′28″N 19°50′16″E

Naming
- English translation: Peak of the Persimmon Tree

Geography
- Location within Albania
- Country: Albania
- Region: Albanian Alps
- Municipality: Tropojë
- Parent range: Accursed Mountains

Geology
- Mountain type: summit
- Rock type: limestone

Maja e Kakisë (lit. 'Peak of the Persimmon Tree') is a summit of the Kakia Block, a distinct mountain subunit located south of the Zhaborret ridgeline, in the Accursed Mountains range. Rising to a height of 2,359 m (7,740 ft), it forms a prominent landmark of the regional alpine relief.

== Geology ==
The central part of the Kakia Block, extending between Dënell Pass and Agra Pass, is defined by three main peaks – Maja e Kakisë (2,359 m), Maja e Drenit (2,004 m) and Maja e Zezë (1,923 m) – which are separated by the depression of Bjeshka e Madhe. The ridge system is interrupted by two major tectonic-erosional passes, Kakia Pass and Gradë Pass, that subdivide the massif and provide natural corridors through it.

The southwestern slope, between Maja e Drenit and the Gradë valley, is deeply incised by numerous glacial cirques overlooking the Dënell valley and the Bjeshka e Madhe basin. On the northeastern slope, the cirques form elongated troughs that mark the headwaters of the Curraj stream tributaries.

The block is further distinguished by a well-developed karst landscape. Numerous nivokarstic dolines and glacio-karstic depressions occur between the three main peaks.

== Climbing route ==
The ascent starts at Kolbuçaj shepherd’s hut in the village of Vranë, situated at 996 meters above sea level, following a dense mountain trail into the Valley of Kakia. From here, the route climbs sharply up a steep rocky slope to reach Kakia Pass at 1,848 meters.

The hike continues along the ridge, exposed to panoramic views over the valley of Curraj i Epërm and the full chain of the Albanian Alps, stretching from Maja e Boshit and Zhaborret Pass to Shniku, Brijasi, Lugbati, Grykat e Hapëta, Gavni, Svoja, Mali i Hekurave and Sqeta e Cjapit.

After descending once more into the Valley of Kakia from the left-hand side, the trail turns toward the massif’s highest point, Kakia, rising to 2,360 meters and known locally as Maja e Bardhë. The summit is typically reached after about six hours of hiking. The full out-and-back route measures approximately 13 kilometers, with a total elevation gain of 1,500 meters.

== See also ==
- List of mountains in Albania
