= Arith =

Arith may refer to:

== Places ==
- Arith, Savoie, Auvergne-Rhône-Alpes, France
- Mount Arith, Albania

== Other ==
- ARITH Symposium on Computer Arithmetic), annual IEEE conference
- ARITH-MATIC, programming language
