= Cukal =

Mountain in Albania

- Mali i Cukalit
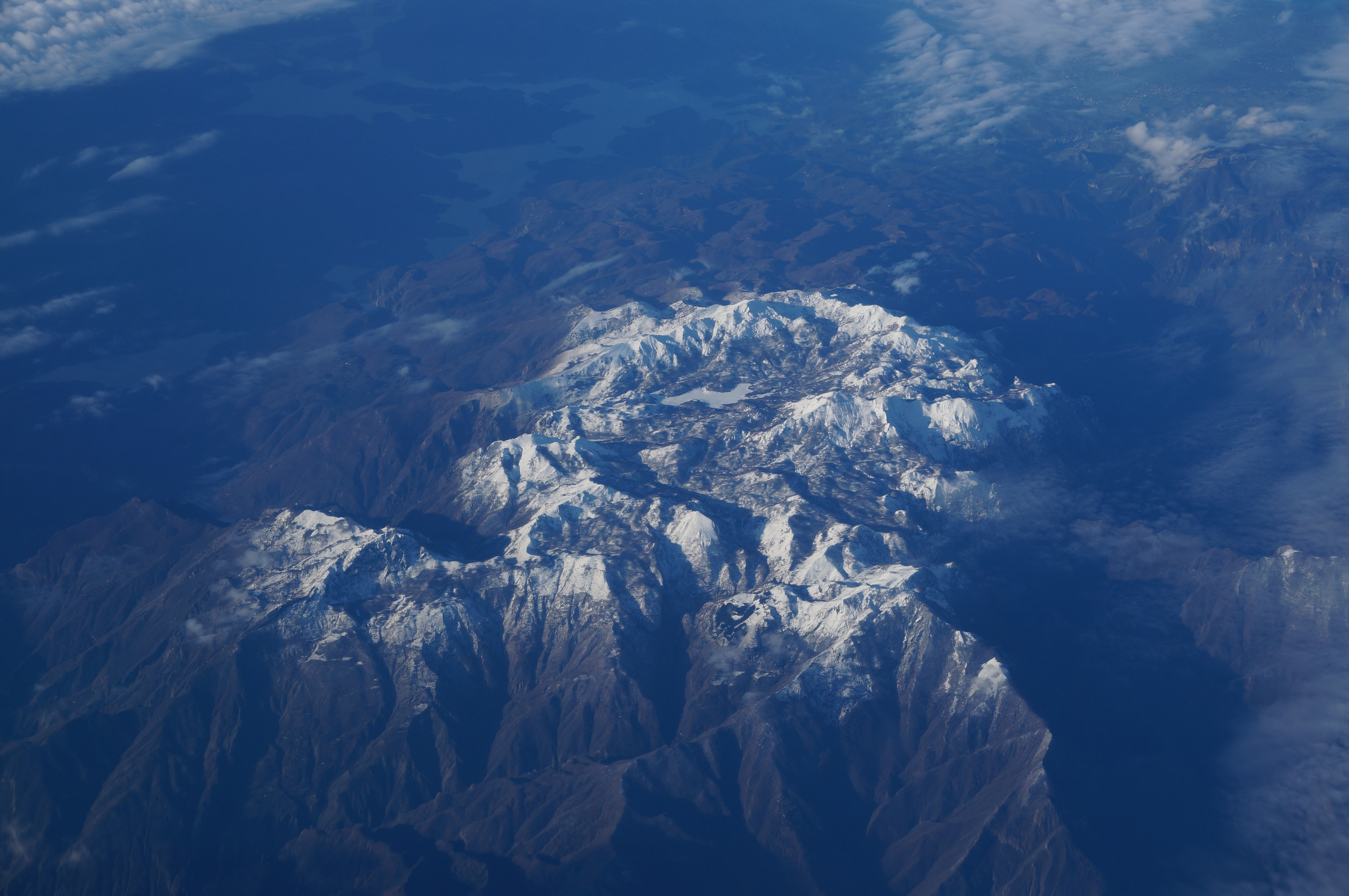
- Cukal massif from above, covered in snow.

Highest point
- Elevation: 1,721 m (5,646 ft)
- Prominence: 235 m (771 ft)
- Isolation: 2.3 km (1.4 mi)
- Coordinates: 42°08′16″N 19°44′18″E

Geography
- Location within Albania
- Country: Albania
- Region: Albanian Alps
- Municipality: Shkodër
- Parent range: Cukal–Biga e Gimajve

Geology
- Rock age(s): Mesozoic, Paleogene
- Mountain type: massif
- Rock type(s): limestone, flysch, shale

Cukal (def. 'Cukali') is a massif situated at the southernmost edge of the Albanian Alps. It is bounded by the river valleys of Kir to the northwest, Lesniqe to the northeast and Drin to the south.

== Geology ==
Extending in the shape of a dome with a northeast–southwest orientation, the massif has a length of 24 km (15 mi) and a width of 8 km (5.0 mi) and is part of the Krastë-Cukal tectonic zone. Composed primarily of Mesozoic limestone, flysch, Paleogene and less of shale and effusive rocks, it has a wrinkled, blocky and scaly structure, highly fragmented by the powerful tectonic movements of the Pliocene-Quaternary.

The central section of the massif is marked by several prominent peaks, including Mbilqeth 1,734 m (5,689 ft), Cukal 1,721 m (5,646 ft), Vila 1,514 m (4,967 ft) and Maja e Bardhë 1,548 m (5,079 ft). Fusha e Lqethit, a pit-like formation rising at an elevation of 1,323 m (4,341 ft), lies between these peaks. The massif is deeply divided by numerous streams originating from its center and flowing into Kir and Drin, creating a harsh alpine environment.

== Biodiversity ==
Cukal is predominantly covered by oak and beech forests, with the presence of maquis shrubland in the southwestern end. On its margins are located the inhabited settlements of Rranxë, Cukal, Shllak, Temaliarë and Duzhman.

Despite being part of the Albanian Alps, it differs from other peaks of this region due to a lower elevation, a relatively milder climate and a lack of alpine pastures in the area.

== See also ==
- List of mountains in Albania
