= List of mountains in Albania =

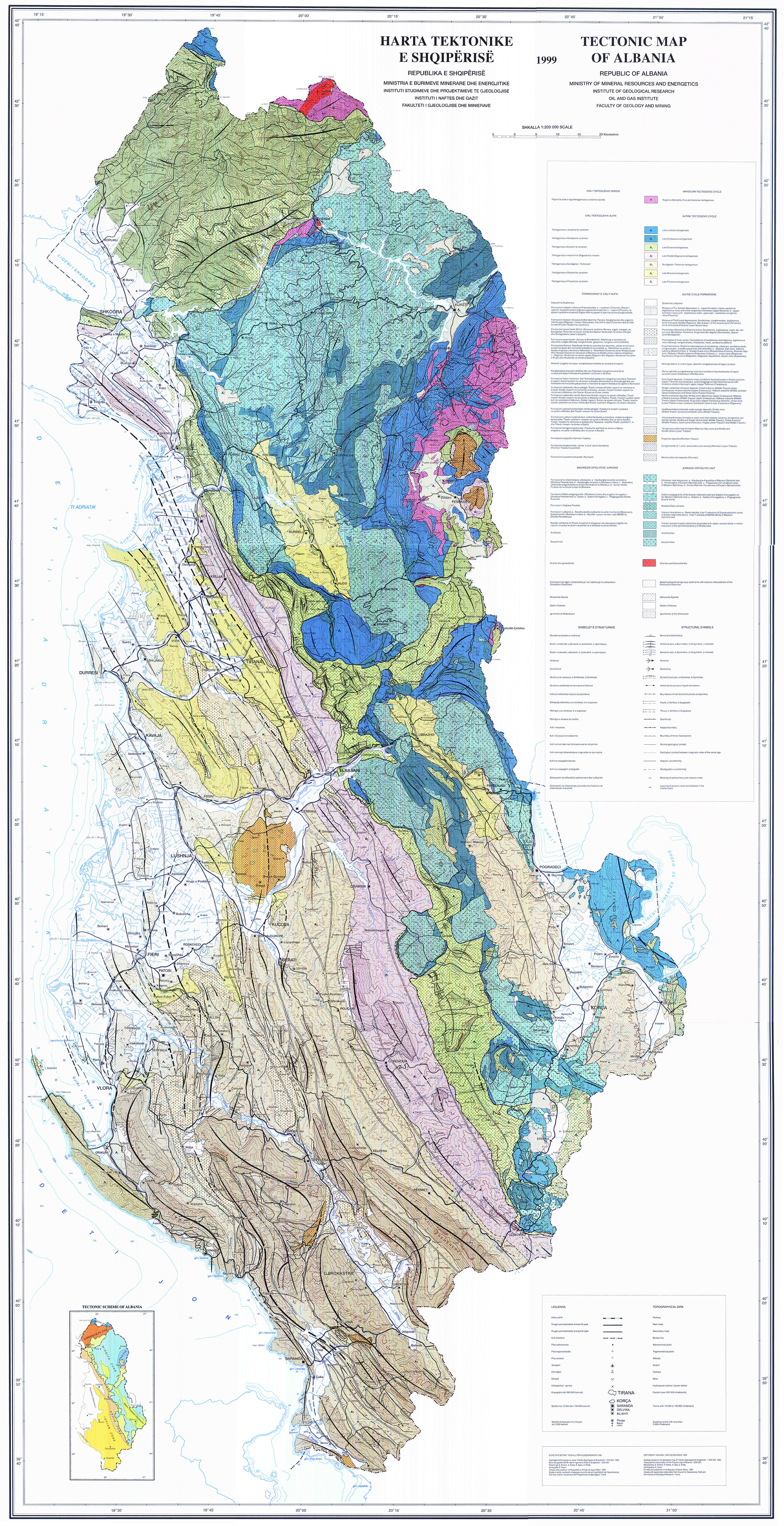
Tectonic map of Albania (1999)

Albania is mostly mountainous, with the first alpine regions forming towards the end of the Jurassic period. During the Cenozoic era, the malformation of the Albanides accelerated, causing the subterranean landscape to take its present form. The average altitude of the country is 708 m (2,323 ft), more than twice that of Europe. Its highest summits are situated in the Accursed Mountains and the eastern mountain range, with Korab being the highest peak, at 2,764 m (9,068 ft) above sea level.

The country's geography is unique due to its location and varied relief, with landscapes ranging from mediterranean in the west to a more continental influence and mountainous terrain in the interior and east. Such combination of plains, hills and mountains has resulted in a diverse range of geographical features, extending horizontally and vertically. However, this complexity has made regionalisation challenging, as different authors have used alternating criteria and methods. In the 1920s, Herbert Louis proposed a scheme that divided Albania into two large regions: Inner Albania and Coastal Albania, each with specific subdivisions. His scheme was widely used until 1964, when it was to be replaced by Pandi Geço's proposed scheme which divided the country into four physiographic regions, listed as follows: Albanian Alps, Central Mountain Region, Southern Mountain Region, Coastal Lowlands and its hills. By 1990, Geço's scheme was improved through further research and consideration of ecological concerns, recapping all regions into 67 constituent subunits.

The earliest written accounts on the mountains of Albania can be attributed to German geographer Kurt Hassert, who explored the northern region of the country in June 1897, carrying out his first expedition to Mount Cukal.

In 1926, British mountaineer C. M. Sleeman surveyed the mountains of northern Albania and his observations later appeared in the 42nd edition of the Alpine Journal.

Franciscan friar Bernardin Palaj penned a collection of memoirs that pay tribute to Albania's mountainous landscapes, highlighting their natural beauty, cultural significance and influence on the traditions and character of the Albanian people.

Distaptur Editions published in 1941 a mountain guidebook titled "Montagne d'Albania", authored by renowned Italian alpinist Piero Ghiglione and printed by the "Geographical Institute De Agostini of Novara". The guidebook includes a study of the rhapsodes of Albanian mountains by Nicola Lo Russo Attoma and contains 117 pages, featuring 60 black and white illustrations from photographs taken by Ghiglione.

The first post-war mountaineering expedition in Albania was organized by the Committee of Physical Culture and Sports that took place on Tomorr in late July 1949. A second expedition the following year was attended by Minella Kapo, a representative of the committee's leadership and an experienced mountaineering instructor, who witnessed the renaming of the main summit from Çuka e Tomorrit to Çuka Partizani. According to mountaineering expert Aleksandër Bojaxhi, the designation of this peak and others that followed was decided not by party officials but by sports forums and even mountaineers themselves.

Mountain database, PeakVisor, identifies 230 peaks exceeding 2,000 meters (including 6 ultra; 20 ribu) and a further 856 peaks above 1,000 meters, though such figures may be inconclusive. Moreover, many listed peak names contain grammatical errors or non-standard exonyms and are incorrectly mapped.

The peaks listed below are arranged by their massifs. Occasionally, the highest peak of the massif is listed instead, if it holds greater notability. The remaining mountains on the list are important landmarks of biodiversity, history, culture and economic impact.

== Main peaks (+2,000 m) ==
shared with neighbouring country
partially based in Albania

No.	Image	Mountain (summit)	Range (chain)	Height	Prominence	Isolation	Map
1		Korab ultra, ribu	Korab	2,764 m (9,068 ft)	2,167 m (7,110 ft)	90 m (300 ft)	List of mountains in Albania is located in Albania
2		Jezercë ultra, ribu	Accursed Mountains	2,694 m (8,839 ft)	2,036 m (6,680 ft)	93.3 km (58.0 mi)	List of mountains in Albania is located in Albania
3		Grykat e Hapëta	Accursed Mountains	2,625 m (8,612 ft)	822 m (2,697 ft)	8.2 km (5.1 mi)	List of mountains in Albania is located in Albania
4		Popluka	Accursed Mountains	2,569 m (8,428 ft)	171 m (561 ft)	1.7 km (1.1 mi)	List of mountains in Albania is located in Albania
5		Radohina	Accursed Mountains	2,568 m (8,425 ft)	856 m (2,808 ft)	6.2 km (3.9 mi)	List of mountains in Albania is located in Albania
6		Mali i Hekurave	Accursed Mountains	2,560 m (8,400 ft)	495 m (1,624 ft)	5.9 km (3.7 mi)	List of mountains in Albania is located in Albania
7		Brijasi	Accursed Mountains	2,557 m (8,389 ft)	160 m (520 ft)	1.4 km (0.87 mi)	List of mountains in Albania is located in Albania
8		Kollata	Shkëlzen; Kollatë	2,553 m (8,376 ft)	519 m (1,703 ft)	8.1 km (5.0 mi)	List of mountains in Albania is located in Albania
9		Shniku	Accursed Mountains	2,552 m (8,373 ft)	618 m (2,028 ft)	17 m (56 ft)	List of mountains in Albania is located in Albania
10		Gusani	Accursed Mountains	2,541 m (8,337 ft)	107 m (351 ft)	1.7 km (1.1 mi)	List of mountains in Albania is located in Albania
11		Gavni	Accursed Mountains	2,530 m (8,300 ft)	338 m (1,109 ft)	1.6 km (0.99 mi)	List of mountains in Albania is located in Albania
12		Maja e Rosit	Accursed Mountains	2,525 m (8,284 ft)	481 m (1,578 ft)	3.8 km (2.4 mi)	List of mountains in Albania is located in Albania
13		Gramoz ribu	Morava Highlands	2,523 m (8,278 ft)	107 m (351 ft)	1.4 km (0.87 mi)	List of mountains in Albania is located in Albania
14		Maja e Vishnjës	Accursed Mountains	2,517 m (8,258 ft)	156 m (512 ft)	3.9 km (2.4 mi)	List of mountains in Albania is located in Albania
15		Gjallica	Korab	2,486 m (8,156 ft)	744 m (2,441 ft)	24 km (15 mi)	List of mountains in Albania is located in Albania
16		Papingu ultra, ribu	Trebeshinë; Dhëmbel; Nemërçkë	2,482 m (8,143 ft)	1,797 m (5,896 ft)	33.2 km (20.6 mi)	List of mountains in Albania is located in Albania
17		Peçmara	Accursed Mountains	2,468 m (8,097 ft)	337 m (1,106 ft)	3 km (1.9 mi)	List of mountains in Albania is located in Albania
18		Maja e Bojës	Accursed Mountains	2,461 m (8,074 ft)	352 m (1,155 ft)	2.2 km (1.4 mi)	List of mountains in Albania is located in Albania
19		Maja e Langojve	Accursed Mountains	2,426 m (7,959 ft)	282 m (925 ft)		List of mountains in Albania is located in Albania
20		Qetat e Harushës	Accursed Mountains	2,421 m (7,943 ft)	120 m (390 ft)	765 m (2,510 ft)	List of mountains in Albania is located in Albania
21		Çuka Partizani ribu	Tomorr; Kulmak; Miçan	2,416 m (7,927 ft)	1,448 m (4,751 ft)	65.6 km (40.8 mi)	List of mountains in Albania is located in Albania
22		Maja e Boshit	Accursed Mountains	2,416 m (7,927 ft)	283 m (928 ft)	2,953 m (9,688 ft)	List of mountains in Albania is located in Albania
23		Shkëlzen	Shkëlzen; Kollatë	2,407 m (7,897 ft)	384 m (1,260 ft)	6.9 km (4.3 mi)	List of mountains in Albania is located in Albania
24		Maja e Thatë	Shkëlzen; Kollatë	2,406 m (7,894 ft)	302 m (991 ft)	2.0 km (1.2 mi)	List of mountains in Albania is located in Albania
25		Bogiçaj	Accursed Mountains	2,405 m (7,890 ft)	136 m (446 ft)	2.1 km (1.3 mi)	List of mountains in Albania is located in Albania
26		Maja e Pikëllimës ribu	Koritnik	2,393 m (7,851 ft)	1,400 m (4,600 ft)	9.9 km (6.2 mi)	List of mountains in Albania is located in Albania
27		Valamara ultra, ribu	Shpat; Polisi; Lenie	2,373 m (7,785 ft)	1,525 m (5,003 ft)	26.5 km (16.5 mi)	List of mountains in Albania is located in Albania
28		Deshat	Korab	2,372 m (7,782 ft)	409 m (1,342 ft)	51 m (167 ft)	List of mountains in Albania is located in Albania
29		Trekufiri	Accursed Mountains	2,366 m (7,762 ft)	65 m (213 ft)	855 m (2,805 ft)	List of mountains in Albania is located in Albania
30		Maja e Kakisë	Accursed Mountains	2,359 m (7,740 ft)	506 m (1,660 ft)	4.8 km (3.0 mi)	List of mountains in Albania is located in Albania
31		Ostrovicë ribu	Ostrovicë; Bofnjë	2,352 m (7,717 ft)	153 m (502 ft)	2.7 km (1.7 mi)	List of mountains in Albania is located in Albania
32		Grama	Korab	2,344 m (7,690 ft)	84 m (276 ft)	1.7 km (1.1 mi)	List of mountains in Albania is located in Albania
33		Alshina	Accursed Mountains	2,295 m (7,530 ft)	119 m (390 ft)	1.1 km (0.68 mi)	List of mountains in Albania is located in Albania
34		Pllaja e Pusit ribu	Mali i Thatë; Rakicë; Llapisht	2,288 m (7,507 ft)	1,121 m (3,678 ft)	30.3 km (18.8 mi)	List of mountains in Albania is located in Albania
35		Shebenik ribu	Shebenik; Jabllanicë; Belicë	2,265 m (7,431 ft)	1,336 m (4,383 ft)	30.3 km (18.8 mi)	List of mountains in Albania is located in Albania
36		Jabllanicë	Shebenik; Jabllanicë; Belicë	2,257 m (7,405 ft)	456 m (1,496 ft)	6.0 km (3.7 mi)	List of mountains in Albania is located in Albania
37		Mali i Dejës ribu	Lura Highlands	2,244 m (7,362 ft)	1,403 m (4,603 ft)	27.5 km (17.1 mi)	List of mountains in Albania is located in Albania
38		Biga e Gimajve	Maranaj; Biga e Gimajve	2,232 m (7,323 ft)	424 m (1,391 ft)	5.9 km (3.7 mi)	List of mountains in Albania is located in Albania
39		Maja e Harapit	Accursed Mountains	2,218 m (7,277 ft)	297 m (974 ft)	1.1 km (0.68 mi)	List of mountains in Albania is located in Albania
40		Vajusha	Accursed Mountains	2,210 m (7,250 ft)	182 m (597 ft)	2.1 km (1.3 mi)	List of mountains in Albania is located in Albania
41		Pallavërca	Accursed Mountains	2,195 m (7,201 ft)	430 m (1,410 ft)	7.7 km (4.8 mi)	List of mountains in Albania is located in Albania
42		Trojan	Vermosh Highlands	2,194 m (7,198 ft)	346 m (1,135 ft)	6.1 km (3.8 mi)	List of mountains in Albania is located in Albania
43		Kallabaku	Shishtavec Plateau	2,174 m (7,133 ft)	340 m (1,120 ft)	8.3 km (5.2 mi)	List of mountains in Albania is located in Albania
44		Kulmak	Tomorr; Kulmak; Miçan	2,173 m (7,129 ft)	721 m (2,365 ft)	20 m (66 ft)	List of mountains in Albania is located in Albania
45		Lunxhëri ribu	Shëndelli; Lunxhëri; Bureto	2,155 m (7,070 ft)	1,309 m (4,295 ft)	10.3 km (6.4 mi)	List of mountains in Albania is located in Albania
46		Serakol	Shishtavec Plateau	2,153 m (7,064 ft)	5 m (16 ft)	174 m (571 ft)	List of mountains in Albania is located in Albania
47		Maja e Gjarprit	Accursed Mountains	2,142 m (7,028 ft)	90 m (300 ft)	842 m (2,762 ft)	List of mountains in Albania is located in Albania
48		Guri i Topit	Shpat; Polisi; Lenie	2,125 m (6,972 ft)	134 m (440 ft)	2.1 km (1.3 mi)	List of mountains in Albania is located in Albania
49		Këndrevica ultra, ribu	Kurvelesh Highlands	2,122 m (6,962 ft)	1,662 m (5,453 ft)	77.4 km (48.1 mi)	List of mountains in Albania is located in Albania
50		Kunora e Lurës	Lura Highlands	2,119 m (6,952 ft)	549 m (1,801 ft)	9.6 km (6.0 mi)	List of mountains in Albania is located in Albania
51		Balgjaj ribu	Lura Highlands	2,101 m (6,893 ft)	1,141 m (3,743 ft)	4.2 km (2.6 mi)	List of mountains in Albania is located in Albania
52		Guri i Zi	Shpat; Polisi; Lenie	2,072 m (6,798 ft)	384 m (1,260 ft)	10.6 km (6.6 mi)	List of mountains in Albania is located in Albania
53		Dhëmbel	Trebeshinë; Dhëmbel; Nemërçkë	2,050 m (6,730 ft)	593 m (1,946 ft)	560 m (1,840 ft)	List of mountains in Albania is located in Albania
54		Kolesjan	Shishtavec Plateau	2,047 m (6,716 ft)	285 m (935 ft)	5.4 km (3.4 mi)	List of mountains in Albania is located in Albania
55		Maja e Çikës ultra, ribu	Ceraunian Mountains	2,045 m (6,709 ft)	1,564 m (5,131 ft)	19.1 km (11.9 mi)	List of mountains in Albania is located in Albania
56		Badarosha	Morava Highlands	2,042 m (6,699 ft)			List of mountains in Albania is located in Albania
57		Runja	Lura Highlands	2,036 m (6,680 ft)	539 m (1,768 ft)	8.5 km (5.3 mi)	List of mountains in Albania is located in Albania
58		Maja e Qorres	Ceraunian Mountains	2,018 m (6,621 ft)	231 m (758 ft)	3.27 km (2.03 mi)	List of mountains in Albania is located in Albania
59		Lenie	Shpat; Polisi; Lenie	2,013 m (6,604 ft)	185 m (607 ft)	1.9 km (1.2 mi)	List of mountains in Albania is located in Albania
60		Mali i Lopës	Martanesh Highlands	2,012 m (6,601 ft)	65 m (213 ft)	1.4 km (0.87 mi)	List of mountains in Albania is located in Albania

△ majë/a=peak; mal/i=mountain

== Main peaks (+1,000 m) ==
shared with neighbouring country
partially based in Albania

No.	Image	Mountain (summit)	Range (chain)	Height	Prominence	Isolation	Map
1		Munella ribu	Pukë–Mirditë Highlands	1,990 m (6,530 ft)	1,028 m (3,373 ft)	56 m (184 ft)	List of mountains in Albania is located in Albania
2		Pashtrik ribu	Has Highlands	1,989 m (6,526 ft)	1,423 m (4,669 ft)	12.3 km (7.6 mi)	List of mountains in Albania is located in Albania
3		Arithi	Pukë–Mirditë Highlands	1,981 m (6,499 ft)	377 m (1,237 ft)	7.8 km (4.8 mi)	List of mountains in Albania is located in Albania
4		Polisi	Shpat; Polisi; Lenie	1,974 m (6,476 ft)	864 m (2,835 ft)	7.28 km (4.52 mi)	List of mountains in Albania is located in Albania
5		Mali i Zepës ribu	Pukë–Mirditë Highlands	1,967 m (6,453 ft)	1,000 m (3,300 ft)	15.7 km (9.8 mi)	List of mountains in Albania is located in Albania
6		Rungajë	Korçë Basin	1,945 m (6,381 ft)	333 m (1,093 ft)	10.1 km (6.3 mi)	List of mountains in Albania is located in Albania
7		Trebeshinë ribu	Trebeshinë; Dhëmbel; Nemërçkë	1,922 m (6,306 ft)	1,369 m (4,491 ft)	13.9 km (8.6 mi)	List of mountains in Albania is located in Albania
8		Kaptina e Martaneshit	Martanesh Highlands	1,870 m (6,140 ft)	226 m (741 ft)	6.8 km (4.2 mi)	List of mountains in Albania is located in Albania
9		Lungara	Ceraunian Mountains	1,863 m (6,112 ft)	701 m (2,300 ft)	6.6 km (4.1 mi)	List of mountains in Albania is located in Albania
10		Maja e Lucës	Delvinë Basin	1,833 m (6,014 ft)	828 m (2,717 ft)	23.9 km (14.9 mi)	List of mountains in Albania is located in Albania
11		Mali i Shpatit	Shpat; Polisi; Lenie	1,831 m (6,007 ft)	286 m (938 ft)	9.0 km (5.6 mi)	List of mountains in Albania is located in Albania
12		Mali me Gropa	Skanderbeg Mountains	1,822 m (5,978 ft)	436 m (1,430 ft)	11.2 km (7.0 mi)	List of mountains in Albania is located in Albania
13		Ujeza	Accursed Mountains	1,821 m (5,974 ft)	45 m (148 ft)	494 m (1,621 ft)	List of mountains in Albania is located in Albania
14		Murgana ribu	Mali i Gjerë; Stugarë	1,806 m (5,925 ft)	419 m (1,375 ft)	1,594 m (5,230 ft)	List of mountains in Albania is located in Albania
15		Shëndelli	Shëndelli; Lunxhëri; Bureto	1,802 m (5,912 ft)	663 m (2,175 ft)	18 m (59 ft)	List of mountains in Albania is located in Albania
16		Mali i Gjerë	Mali i Gjerë; Stugarë	1,789 m (5,869 ft)	972 m (3,189 ft)	464 m (1,522 ft)	List of mountains in Albania is located in Albania
17		Bureto	Shëndelli; Lunxhëri; Bureto	1,763 m (5,784 ft)	817 m (2,680 ft)	428 m (1,404 ft)	List of mountains in Albania is located in Albania
18		Veleçik	Accursed Mountains	1,727 m (5,666 ft)	266 m (873 ft)	5.2 km (3.2 mi)	List of mountains in Albania is located in Albania
19		Mali i Skënderbeut	Skanderbeg Mountains	1,724 m (5,656 ft)	499 m (1,637 ft)	18.4 km (11.4 mi)	List of mountains in Albania is located in Albania
20		Goliku	Trebeshinë; Dhëmbel; Nemërçkë	1,722 m (5,650 ft)	155 m (509 ft)	4.2 km (2.6 mi)	List of mountains in Albania is located in Albania
21		Cukal	Cukal; Biga e Gimajve	1,721 m (5,646 ft)	235 m (771 ft)	2.3 km (1.4 mi)	List of mountains in Albania is located in Albania
22		Krrabi	Pukë–Mirditë Highlands	1,680 m (5,510 ft)	85 m (279 ft)	1.5 km (0.93 mi)	List of mountains in Albania is located in Albania
23		Guri i Muzhaqit	Çermenikë Highlands	1,663 m (5,456 ft)	210 m (690 ft)	6.4 km (4.0 mi)	List of mountains in Albania is located in Albania
24		Qelqëz	Dangëllia Highlands	1,662 m (5,453 ft)	0 m (0 ft)	53 m (174 ft)	List of mountains in Albania is located in Albania
25		Dajti	Skanderbeg Mountains	1,613 m (5,292 ft)	939 m (3,081 ft)	36 m (118 ft)	List of mountains in Albania is located in Albania
26		Mali i Shejtit	Pukë–Mirditë Highlands	1,583 m (5,194 ft)	142 m (466 ft)	1.3 km (0.81 mi)	List of mountains in Albania is located in Albania
27		Miçan	Tomorr; Kulmak; Miçan	1,581 m (5,187 ft)	33 m (108 ft)	23 m (75 ft)	List of mountains in Albania is located in Albania
28		Maranaj	Maranaj; Biga e Gimajve	1,576 m (5,171 ft)	235 m (771 ft)	4.8 km (3.0 mi)	List of mountains in Albania is located in Albania
29		Postenan	Melesin; Postenan	1,559 m (5,115 ft)	462 m (1,516 ft)	9.2 km (5.7 mi)	List of mountains in Albania is located in Albania
30		Kokojka	Dangëllia Highlands	1,553 m (5,095 ft)	108 m (354 ft)	1.8 km (1.1 mi)	List of mountains in Albania is located in Albania
31		Guri i Capit	Morava Highlands	1,547 m (5,075 ft)	26 m (85 ft)	330 m (1,080 ft)	List of mountains in Albania is located in Albania
32		Rrëza e Kanalit	Ceraunian Mountains	1,499 m (4,918 ft)	472 m (1,549 ft)	5.9 km (3.7 mi)	List of mountains in Albania is located in Albania
33		Guri i Kamjes	Gora Highlands	1,455 m (4,774 ft)	0 m (0 ft)	14 m (46 ft)	List of mountains in Albania is located in Albania
34		Mali i Krujës	Skanderbeg Mountains	1,422 m (4,665 ft)	398 m (1,306 ft)	3.3 km (2.1 mi)	List of mountains in Albania is located in Albania
35		Melesin	Melesin; Postenan	1,411 m (4,629 ft)	503 m (1,650 ft)	4.8 km (3.0 mi)	List of mountains in Albania is located in Albania
36		Shpirag	Mallakastër Hills	1,198 m (3,930 ft)	666 m (2,185 ft)	20.9 km (13.0 mi)	List of mountains in Albania is located in Albania
37		Mali i Velës	Skanderbeg Mountains	1,172 m (3,845 ft)	850 m (2,790 ft)	20.6 km (12.8 mi)	List of mountains in Albania is located in Albania
38		Mali i Konjakut	Ceraunian Mountains	1,140 m (3,740 ft)	155 m (509 ft)	2.96 km (1.84 mi)	List of mountains in Albania is located in Albania

△ majë/a=peak; mal/i=mountain

== See also ==
- Protected areas of Albania
- Geography of Albania
