= Munella =

Mountain in Albania

- Mali i Munellës
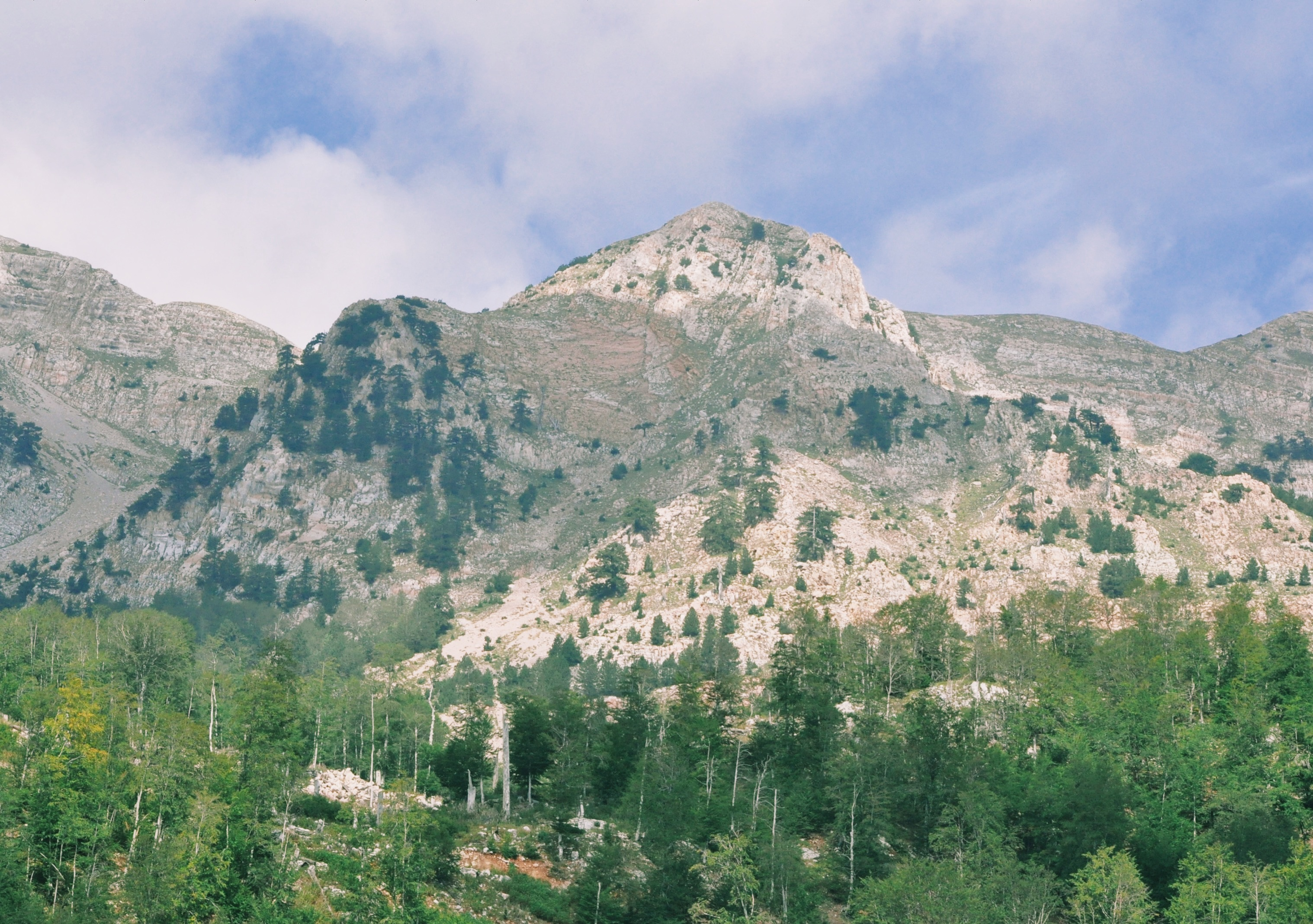
- View of Munella in Mirditë

Highest point
- Elevation: 1,990 m (6,530 ft)
- Prominence: 1,028 m (3,373 ft)
- Isolation: 56 m (184 ft)
- Listing: Ribu
- Coordinates: 41°58′29″N 20°05′54″E

Geography
- Location within Albania
- Country: Albania
- Region: Central Mountain Region
- Municipality: Pukë, Mirditë

Geology
- Rock age: Cretaceous
- Mountain type: mountain
- Rock type: limestone

Munella is a mountain in northern Albania, stretching along the boundaries of Pukë and Mirditë municipalities. It lies between the river valleys of the Great Fan to the northwest and the Little Fan to the southeast. Its highest peak, Maja e Kryqit, reaches a height of 1,990 m (6,530 ft).

== Geology ==
Munella is primarily composed of effusive rocks up to an elevation of 1,400 m (4,600 ft), overlaid by a Cretaceous limestone slab. The mountain has an elongated shape, extending approximately 6 km (3.7 mi) in length and 3 km (1.9 mi) in width. Its summit features an undulating surface with a gentle northeastward incline, marked by numerous karst pits and funnels. The slopes on the northwest and southeast sides form cliffs up to 300 m (980 ft) deep within the limestone layer, while the slopes composed of effusive rock are generally less steep.

== Biodiversity ==
Munella constitutes the watershed between the Great Fan and Little Fan rivers. Oak trees (up to 1100m) and beech trees (up to 1600m) make up most of the vegetation; beyond these heights, the mountain is barren. Its peak is abound with alpine pastures. The region is populated by bears, wild boars and furry animals like beech marten and the European pine marten, with the wild turkey being a rare sight. The area is an important breeding ground of the critically endangered Balkan lynx.

Additionally, copper ores are present in the northwest (Tuç) and southeast (Reps).

== See also ==
- List of mountains in Albania
