= Vajusha =

Summit in Albania

- Maja e Vajushës
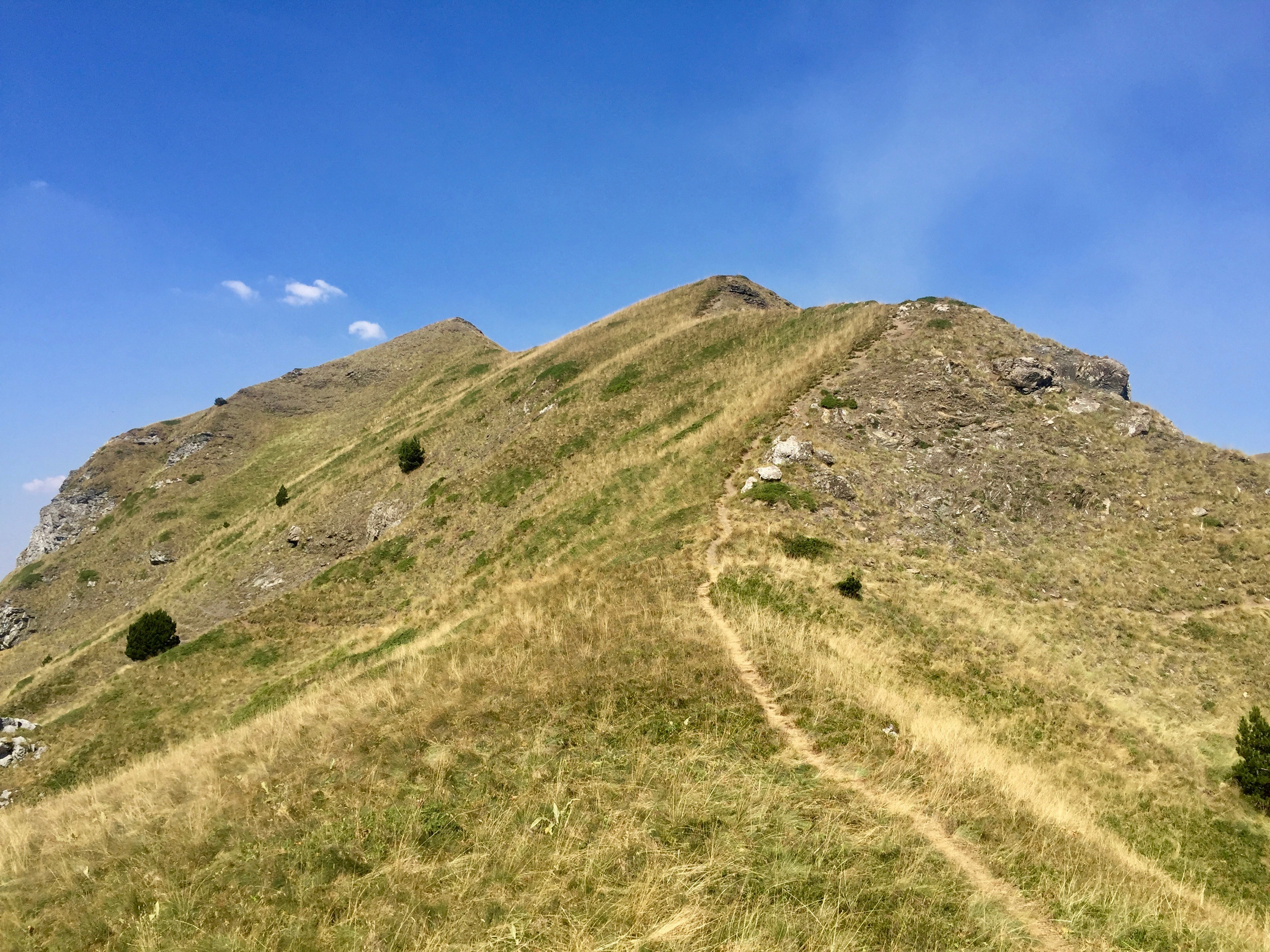
- East ridge of Maja e Vajushës

Highest point
- Elevation: 2,210 m (7,250 ft)
- Prominence: 182 m (597 ft)
- Isolation: 2.1 km (1.3 mi)
- Coordinates: 42°30′58″N 19°45′36″E

Naming
- English translation: Widow's Peak

Geography
- Location within Albania Location within Montenegro
- Countries: Albania; Montenegro
- Region: Albanian Alps
- Municipality: Malësi e Madhe
- Parent range: Accursed Mountains

Geology
- Mountain type: summit
- Rock type: limestone

Vajusha (lit. 'Widow's Peak') is a prominent summit in the Accursed Mountains range, located on the border between northern Albania and Montenegro. It reaches a height of 2,210 m (7,250 ft) above sea level, rising above the upper Grebaje Valley on the Montenegrin side and the Lepushë village on the Albanian one.

== Etymology ==
The name Vajusha derives from the alpine pasture of Vajushë (Albanian: Widow), situated below the ridge on its southeastern side. Historical and regional sources record multiple variations of the name, including Maja e Vajushës, Maja Vajušes, Maja e Vajushit, Vajušit, Vojusha, Vojuša, etc.

== Topography ==
The detailed 1963 map by M. Marković and Ž. Poljak, identifies two distinct summits along the Vajusha ridge: a 2,210 m summit, located directly on the former Albanian–Yugoslav border overlooking the Grebaje Valley; and a higher summit of 2,270 m, situated entirely within the Albanian territory, set slightly behind the main ridge.

The higher interior summit rises above the alpine basin of Zastan and is locally known as Maja e Zastanit. Modern local measurements place this summit at approximately 2,275 m.

Together, the ridge system consists of three connected sections, informally referred to as Vajushi I, Vajushi II and Maja e Zastanit, forming a continuous high ridge above Grebaje and Lepushë.

The name Maja e Vajushës is also applied to a lower summit of 2,057 m (sometimes listed as 2,056 m), located on the Vallushnica ridge. This peak lies north of the Vajushë pasture and south of Popadije. On the Montenegrin side, it is known as Talijanka.

== See also ==
- List of mountains in Albania
- List of mountains in Montenegro
