= Krrabi =

Mountain in Albania

- Mali i Krrabit
- Location within Albania

Highest point
- Elevation: 1,680 m (5,510 ft)
- Prominence: 85 m (279 ft)
- Isolation: 1.5 km (0.93 mi)
- Coordinates: 42°07′00″N 19°59′25″E

Naming
- English translation: Shepherd's crook

Geography
- Country: Albania
- Region: Central Mountain Region
- Municipality: Bulqizë
- Parent range: Pukë-Mirditë Highlands

Geology
- Mountain type: mountain
- Rock type: ultrabasic rocks

Krrabi (lit. 'Shepherd's crook') is a mountain located at the northernmost edge of Pukë municipality, in northern Albania. It reaches an elevation of 1,680 m (5,510 ft) at its highest point, Maja e Midës.

== Geology ==
The mountain is composed entirely of ultrabasic rocks and exhibits a block-type structure which is intensely fragmented as a result of recent tectonic dislocations. To the northeast, Krrabi is connected via the Laku i Ballçit Pass with Kunora e Dardhës massif and the peak of Mali i Madh.

Its terrain is characterized by intense vertical and horizontal dissection, most evident along the southwestern slope. This rugged relief has been shaped by erosion from the left-bank tributaries of the Drin River to the northwest and the headwaters of the Great Fan River to the southeast, giving rise to several locally distinct erosion centers.

== Biodiversity ==
Elevated sections of the mountain, above 1,200 meters, fall entirely within the oak forest vegetation belt.

The surrounding area is noted for the presence of economically significant mineral resources.

== See also ==
- List of mountains in Albania
