= Shpirag =

Mountain in Albania

- Mali i Shpiragut
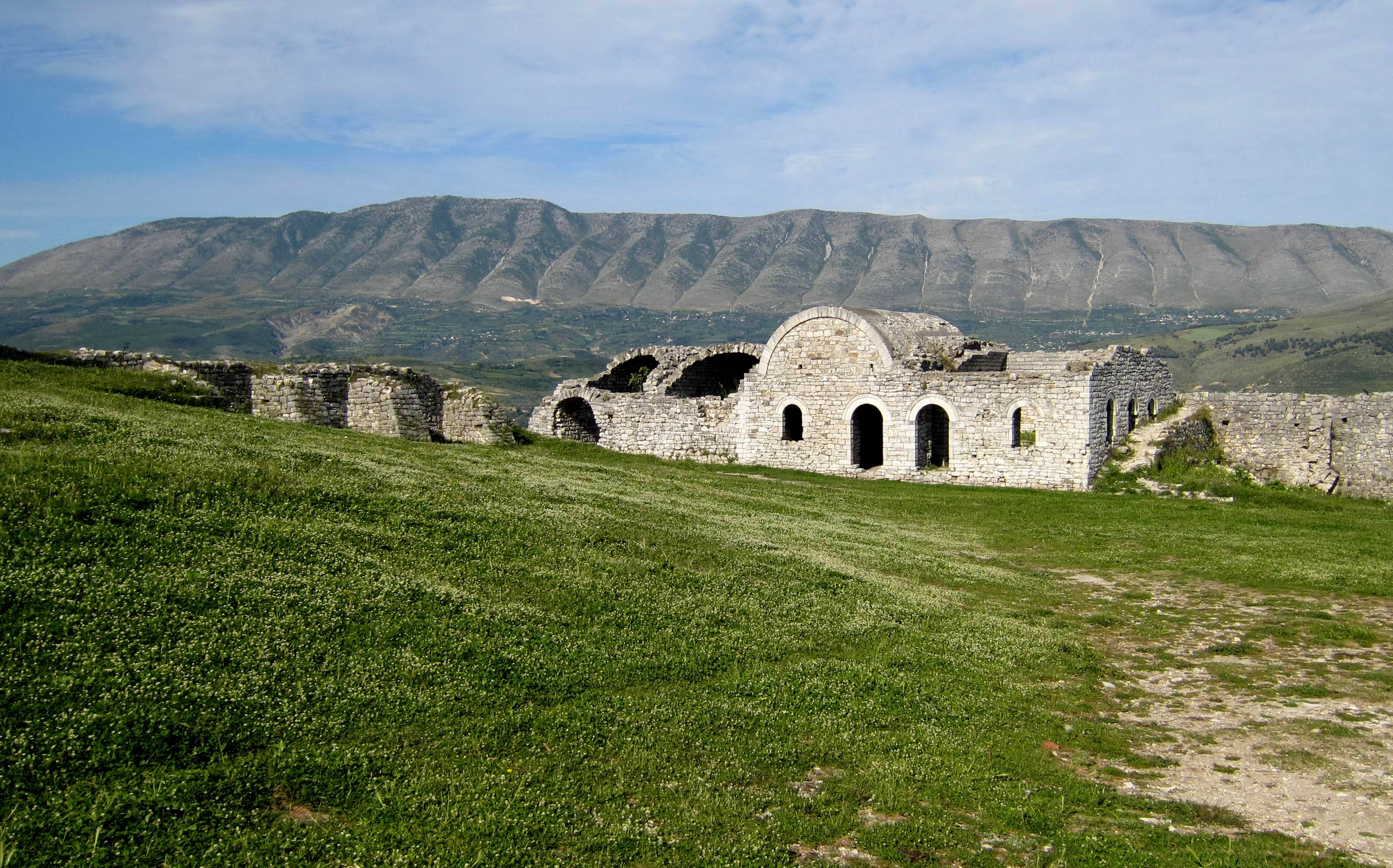
- Shpirag seen from a distance

Highest point
- Elevation: 1,198 m (3,930 ft)
- Prominence: 666 m (2,185 ft)
- Isolation: 20.86 km (12.96 mi)
- Coordinates: 40°40′06″N 19°51′58″E

Naming
- Nickname: Mali me vija
- English translation: Mountain with lines

Geography
- Location within Albania
- Country: Albania
- Region: Coastal Lowlands
- Municipality: Berat
- Parent range: Kodrat e Mallakastrës
- Borders on: Maja e Gradishtit

Geology
- Mountain type: massif
- Rock type: limestone

Shpirag (def. 'Shpiragu') is a massif located 5 km (3.1 mi) from the historic center of Berat, in south-central Albania. It reaches a height of 1,198 m (3,930 ft) above sea level.

== Geology ==
The massif has an elongated crest, with a narrow ridge that slopes rapidly from north to south, forming low hills around it and is easily identifiable on geographical maps. Composed of limestone marked by grooves, on its eastern side it features a large stone sign with the inscription "ENVER", in honor of communist leader Enver Hoxha.

The northeastern sides have been weathered by a network of parallel streams, which are almost equidistant from each other, giving the impression of lines and thus earning the nickname "Mountain with lines" (Albanian: Mali me vija). Karstic water springs are present in the village of Sinjë at the northwestern end of the mountain.

Vegetation is scarce, with Mediterranean oaks scattered around the massif.

== Marked slogan ==
The slogan "ENVER," displayed in large letters on the eastern side of the mountain, was meticulously crafted in record time, just 15 days, during the fall holiday season of 1969, through the efforts of local volunteers. The execution of this task involved the use of telescopes positioned on the balcony of the former Executive Committee building and in the western part of Berat Castle. Commands were communicated via radio and manual army telephones. Natural slate stones, sourced from the bed of the Osum river, were carefully placed on the foundations of the letters and were held in place using lime, in the form of mortar. Each letter measured an impressive 80 m (260 ft) in length and 40 m (130 ft) in width, with the lines having a thickness of approximately 2 m (6 ft 7 in).

After the fall of the regime in 1994, an attempt was made to remove the stones, which had become embedded in the mountain. The Albanian army even tried, unsuccessfully, to remove the sign using napalm, injuring one soldier in the process.

The letters remained barely visible for some time, but farmer Sheme Filja restored them three years later at the request of communist officials. In 2012, the letters “N” and “E” were swapped to spell "NEVER". This alteration was carried out by Filja and his nephew, who power-washed the sign for a documentary by filmmaker Armando Lulaj, framing it as an act of defiance.

== See also ==
- List of mountains in Albania
