= Maja e Lucës =

Summit in Albania

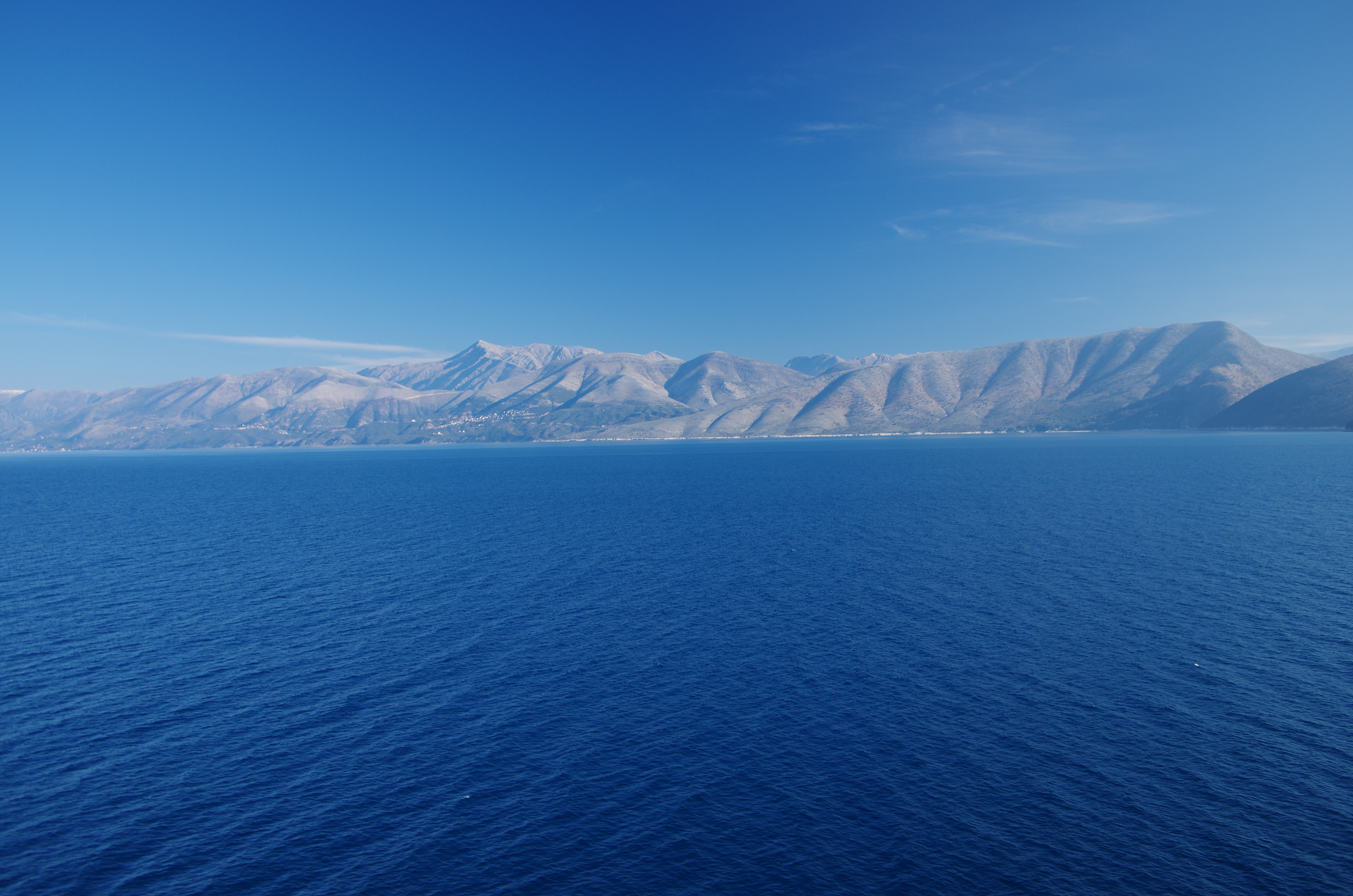

Highest point
- Elevation: 1,833 m (6,014 ft)
- Prominence: 828 m (2,717 ft)
- Isolation: 23.9 km (14.9 mi)
- Coordinates: 40°04′16″N 19°56′53″E

Geography
- Location within Albania
- Country: Albania
- Region: Southern Mountain Region
- Municipality: Delvinë, Gjirokastër
- Parent range: Delvinë Basin

Geology
- Mountain type: summit

Maja e Lucës is a summit in southern Albania, situated at the northern margin of the Delvinë Basin, near the administrative boundary between Delvinë and Gjirokastër municipalities. Rising to an elevation of 1,833 m (6,014 ft), it forms one of the highest points of the southwestern region.

== Geology ==
The mountain is characterized by its distinct pyramidal summit, which dominates the surrounding landscape. Due to its elevation, it is often covered in snow until early summer. Numerous karst springs emerge on both the western and eastern foothills of its mass. The most significant of these is the Tatzati Spring, which serves as the principal source of the Kalasë River.

== Biodiversity ==
Vegetation varies with altitude and slope exposure. Mediterranean shrubland and holm oak (Quercus ilex) dominate the lower slopes, while fir forests occur locally on the northeastern slopes. Higher elevations are covered by alpine and subalpine grasslands, traditionally used for grazing.

== See also ==
- List of mountains in Albania
