= Maja e Langojve =

Summit in Albania

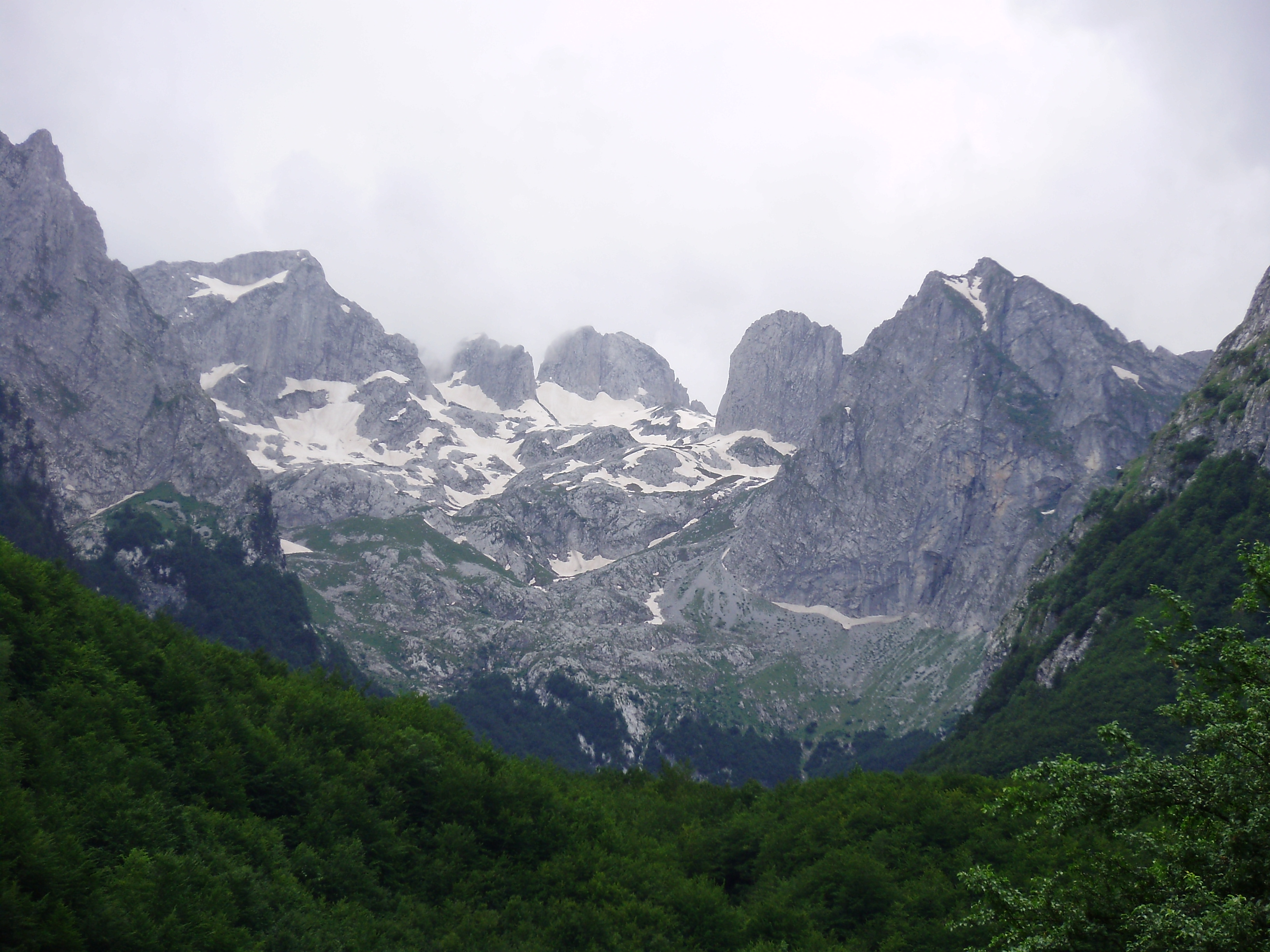

Highest point
- Elevation: 2,426 m (7,959 ft)
- Prominence: 282 m (925 ft)
- Coordinates: 42°29′10″N 19°45′42″E

Naming
- English translation: Hounds Peak

Geography
- Location within Albania
- Country: Albania
- Region: Albanian Alps
- Municipality: Shkodër
- Parent range: Accursed Mountains

Geology
- Rock age(s): Mesozoic, Neogene
- Mountain type: summit
- Rock type(s): limestone, dolomite

Maja e Langojve (lit. 'Hounds Peak') is a summit in the Accursed Mountains, part of the mountain group of the same name. Rising at an elevation of 2,426 m (7,959 ft) above sea level, it is located west of Vukoça, near the border region between Albania and Montenegro. The summit is known for its steep rock face and opportunities for alpine climbing.

== Etymology ==
The name Langojve derives from the Albanian noun langoj, meaning hound or hunting dog. The form 'e Langojve' represents the genitive plural, which translates to "of the Hounds".

Other variants such as Langojvet or Lagojvet also appear in mountaineering literature and maps, reflecting dialectal norms used in northern Albanian gheg speech.

== Geology ==
The Langojve group consists of several peaks aligned from east to west, reaching up to 2,498 m above sea level. From these peaks, four are generally considered the most prominent: two on the left side of the ridge, a central tower and a chimney-like formation to the right.

Further north stand additional peaks such as Nigvaci (2,412 m) and Maja e Gosdinës (2,269 m).

The group lies on the northwestern margin of the Veleçik–Bridash plateau, forming one of the roughest and sharpest ridges within these highlands due to the presence of monoclinal depressions and the massive structure of the limestone formations.

== Biodiversity ==
The lower slopes are covered with beech and mixed forests, while higher elevations transition into subalpine shrubs and alpine meadows.

These high pastures support seasonal grazing during the summer months. The surrounding region is home to a variety of wildlife, including chamois and the golden eagle.

== Climbing route ==
The summit is most easily accessed via the trail leading toward Buni i Vukoçës, branching off near Qafa e Pejës. The southeastern base of the massif can be reached without significant difficulty, making it a common starting point for climbers.

From the alpine pastures of Buni i Gropave, climbers may follow shepherd paths that traverse the western slopes and lead toward the base.

== See also ==
- List of mountains in Albania
