= Serakol =

Mountain in Albania

- Mali i Serakolit
- Location within Albania

Highest point
- Elevation: 2,153 m (7,064 ft)
- Prominence: 5 m (16 ft)
- Isolation: 174 m (571 ft)
- Coordinates: 41°50′29″N 20°31′02″E

Geography
- Country: Albania
- Region: Central Mountain Region
- Municipality: Kukës
- Parent range: Korab

Geology
- Rock age: Neogene
- Mountain type: mountain
- Rock type: shale

Serakol (def. Serakoli) is a mountain in northeastern Albania, part of the Korab-Koritnik Nature Park. It lies south of the Shishtavec plateau, separated from the valley of Çaja stream (Bushtricë). Its highest peak, Kulla e Zyberit, reaches a height of 2,153 m (7,064 ft).

== Geology ==
Composed almost entirely of shale, with a scaly and blocky structure, the mountain features an elongated shape with a northwest–southeast orientation. It is divided into two sections, the southeastern section, which represents the highest relief, Kulla e Zyberit (2,153 m) and the northwestern section, which descends abruptly into the valley of the Black Drin.

The northern slope of the mountain is modeled by glacial cirques, while the southeastern side drops steeply into the valley of Veleshicë. Its ridge exhibits a neogene erosive surface, resulting in an almost flat relief. The northwestern portion forms a gentle terrain, overly fragmented by erosive-denuding processes, gradually descending towards the Black Drin valley.

== See also ==
- List of mountains in Albania
