= Kokojka =

Mountain in Albania

- Kokojka e Frashërit
- Location within Albania

Highest point
- Elevation: 1,553 m (5,095 ft)
- Prominence: 108 m (354 ft)
- Isolation: 1.8 km (1.1 mi)
- Coordinates: 40°20′49″N 20°24′59″E

Naming
- English translation: Hillock

Geography
- Country: Albania
- Region: Southern Mountain Region
- Municipality: Përmet
- Parent range: Dangëllia Highlands

Geology
- Rock age: Paleogene
- Mountain type: mountain
- Rock type(s): limestone, flysch

Kokojka (lit. 'Hillock'), sometimes known as Kokojka e Frashërit, is a mountain in southern Albania, within the municipal boundaries of Përmet. Rising at 1,553 m (5,095 ft) above sea level, it forms part of the mountainous relief separating the Dangëllia region from the neighboring territory.

== Geology ==
Kokojka is composed primarily of limestone and Paleogene flysch formations and features two peaks: Kokojka (1,553 m) and the higher Tabori peak (1,572 m).

== Biodiversity ==
The mountain is covered by dense forest vegetation dominated by oak, with extensive stands of Macedonian fir (Abies borisii-regis) spreading near the summits. The fir forest forms a large, continuous massif that has been designated as a national park due to its ecological significance.

== See also ==
- List of mountains in Albania
