= Kaptina e Martaneshit =

Mountain in Albania

- Location within Albania

Highest point
- Elevation: 1,870 m (6,140 ft)
- Prominence: 226 m (741 ft)
- Isolation: 6.8 km (4.2 mi)
- Coordinates: 41°22′48″N 20°18′05″E

Naming
- English translation: Martanesh Crest

Geography
- Country: Albania
- Region: Central Mountain Region
- Municipality: Librazhd, Bulqizë, Klos
- Parent range: Martanesh Highlands

Geology
- Rock age: Paleogene
- Mountain type: mountain
- Rock type: flysch

Kaptina e Martaneshit (lit. 'Martanesh Crest') is a mountain in the Martanesh Highlands of eastern Albania. Situated along the administrative boundaries of Librazhd, Bulqizë and Klos municipalities, it rises to an elevation of 1,870 m (6,140 ft) above sea level.

== Geology ==
The mountain is composed primarily of Paleogene flysch and is distinguished by its pyramidal shape. It forms an important watershed divide separating three major drainage basins: its northeastern slopes flow into the Okshtun stream, a tributary of the Black Drin; its southern slopes drain toward the Rrapun river; and its western slopes descend toward the Mat river basin.

== Biodiversity ==
Vegetation consists of dense beech forests, while the higher elevations are partly covered by alpine pastures used for seasonal grazing.

== See also ==
- List of mountains in Albania
