= Mali i Velës =

Mountain in Albania

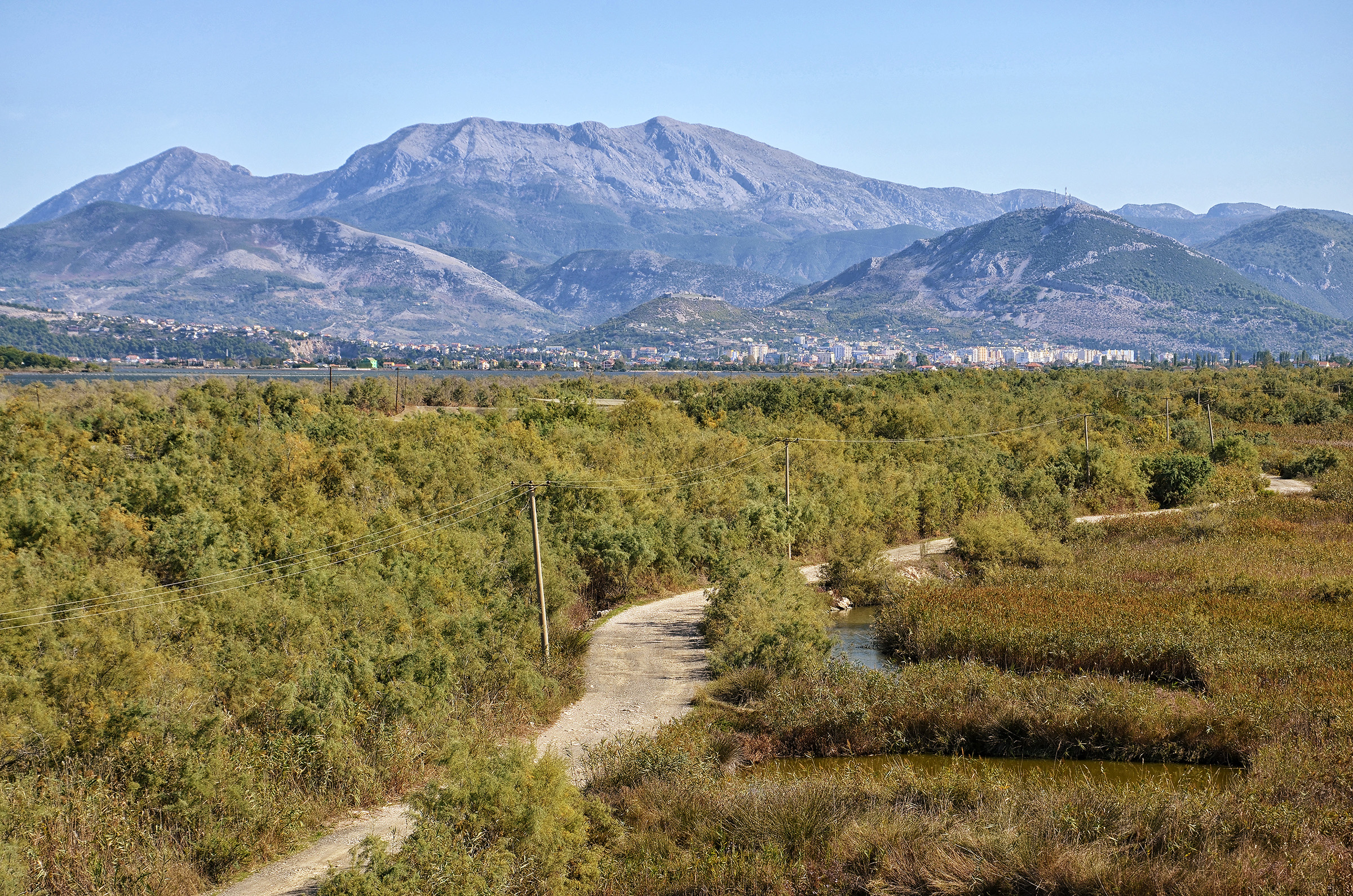
- View of the massif seen from the Kunë-Vain-Talë Nature Park

Highest point
- Elevation: 1,172 m (3,845 ft)
- Prominence: 850 m (2,790 ft)
- Isolation: 20.6 km (12.8 mi)
- Coordinates: 41°49′06″N 19°43′24″E

Naming
- Nickname: Sail Mountain

Geography
- Location within Albania
- Country: Albania
- Region: Central Mountain Region
- Municipality: Lezhë
- Parent range: Skanderbeg Mountains

Geology
- Rock age(s): Triassic, Jurassic
- Mountain type: massif
- Rock type: limestone

Mali i Velës (lit. 'Sail Mountain') is a massif in northwestern Albania, part of the Skanderbeg Mountains range. It rises to an elevation of 1,172 m (3,845 ft) above sea level, visible from the coastal lowlands of Lezhë municipality.

== Geology ==
Mali i Velës breaks up into a series of narrow ridges that gradually descend toward the Fan Gorge. Its main ridge is composed of Triassic–Jurassic limestone, while the eastern section is built of terrigenous deposits dating from the Late Cretaceous and Paleogene. This alternation of more resistant and weaker rock units produces a stepped relief, characterized by numerous cuestas with predominantly west-facing fronts.

== Biodiversity ==
The mountain slopes are largely covered by deciduous shrubs and oak forests, locally mixed with conifer stands. Medicinal and aromatic plant species are widely abundant and expansive chestnut groves are found in the village of Rreja e Velës.

The area experiences a Mediterranean climate with mild, wet winters and warm, dry summers.

== Attractions ==
Mali i Velës forms part of the hiking and ecotourism network of the Rubik region, with routes offering panoramic views of its surroundings. The nearby village of Katund i Vjetër serves as an ecotourism center, providing traditional accommodation and local cuisine.

Settlements of this area feature numerous kulla-type tower houses, noted for their vernacular architecture and robust stone façades.

Each year, on the first Saturday of June, a pilgrimage takes place at Zoja e Velës, a Catholic shrine on the summit of the massif, with pilgrims climbing the steep limestone slopes to reach the sanctuary.

== See also ==
- List of mountains in Albania
