= Mali i Skënderbeut =

Mountain in Albania

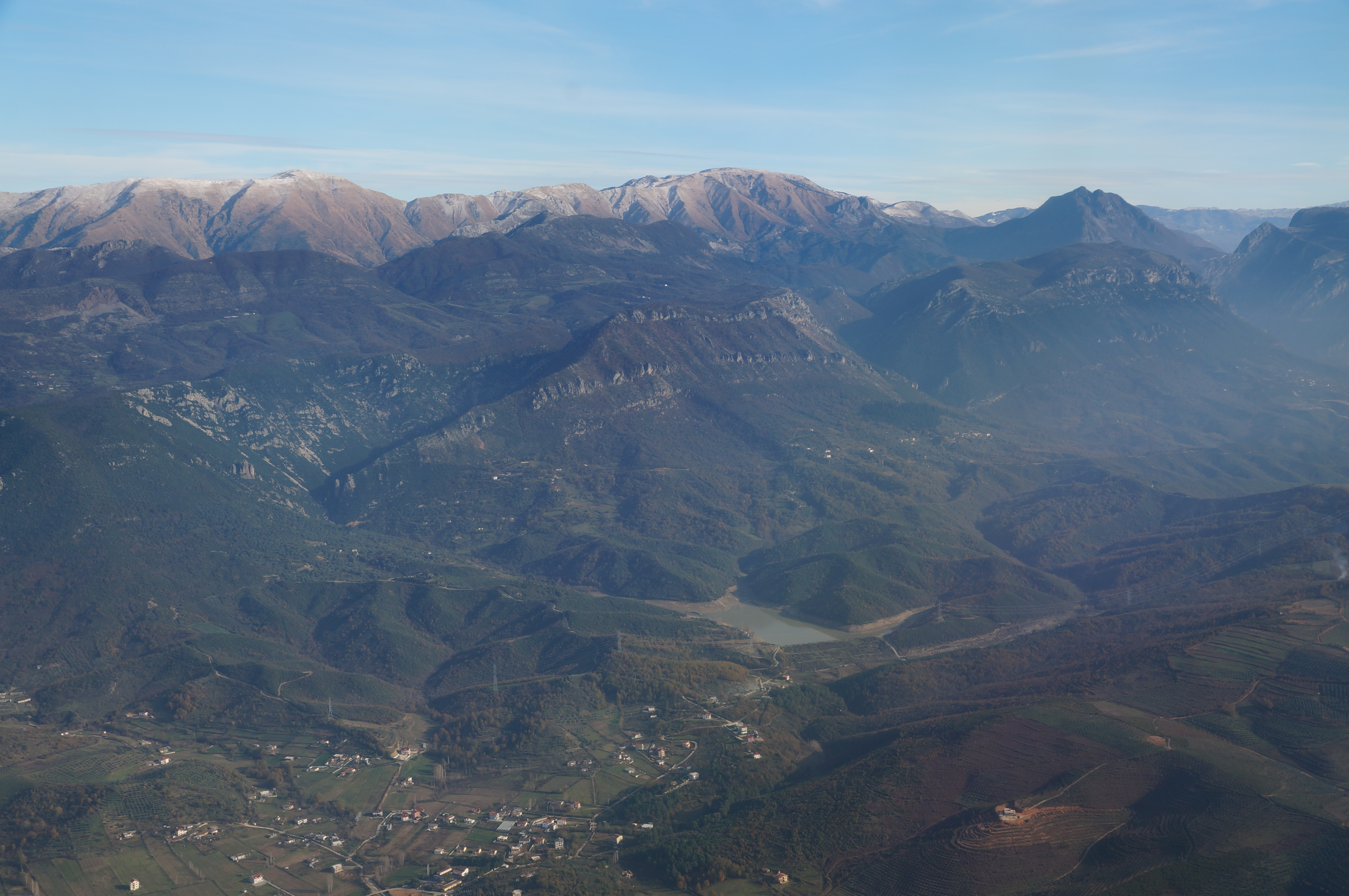
- A view of Skanderbeg Mountains, north of Krujë

Highest point
- Elevation: 1,724 m (5,656 ft)
- Prominence: 499 m (1,637 ft)
- Isolation: 18.4 km (11.4 mi)
- Coordinates: 41°32′28″N 19°52′47″E

Geography
- Location within Albania
- Country: Albania
- Region: Central Mountain Region
- Municipality: Krujë, Mat
- Parent range: Skanderbeg Mountains

Geology
- Rock age: Mesozoic
- Mountain type: massif
- Rock type(s): igneous rock, limestone

Mali i Skënderbeut is a massif located on the border between Krujë and Mat municipalities, in north-central Albania. It stretches from the valley of the Mat river in the north up to Qafa e Shtamës in the south, encompassing a length of 22 km (14 mi) and a width of 2–5 km (1.2–3.1 mi). Part of the mountain range with the same name, its highest peak, Maja e Liqenit, reaches a height of 1,724 m (5,656 ft).

== Etymology ==
Historian Marin Barleti has suggested that the mountain, known in antiquity as Tumenishta, served as a pivotal base in Skanderbeg's military campaigns against the Ottomans. Due to its advantageous geographic and strategic location, here, a dedicated workshop was set up where Skanderbeg would gather his forces and oversee the production of essential military equipment. Recent excavations have revealed the presence of artificial pits, likely used as primitive furnaces for metal smelting.

The mountain acquired its current name as a tribute to Skanderbeg, an Albanian national hero.

== Geology ==
Composed primarily of igneous rocks and partly of Mesozoic limestone, the massif is fragmented by streams which are tributaries of the Mat and Ishëm rivers (Zalli i Shtamës, Zalli i Germenit, Droja, Zeza, Tërkuza, Tirana river). Its undulating relief features steep slopes, with occasional glacial and karst formations. On the northeastern side, approximately 200 m (660 ft) below the highest peak, lie two small glacial lakes, drying up and above, which have given the peak its name.

== Biodiversity ==
Mali i Skënderbeut is covered in dense vegetation, with the presence of maquis and oaks in the lower section, conifers and heather in the middle and upper section and summer pastures on its peaks. The area is home to a diverse range of wildlife, including wild boars, skunks, foxes and mountain partridges.

== See also ==
- List of mountains in Albania
