= Mali i Zepës =

Mountain in Albania

- Location within Albania

Highest point
- Elevation: 1,967 m (6,453 ft)
- Prominence: 1,000 m (3,300 ft)
- Isolation: 15.7 km (9.8 mi)
- Listing: Ribu
- Coordinates: 41°55′47″N 20°13′59″E

Geography
- Country: Albania
- Region: Central Mountain Region
- Municipality: Mirditë
- Parent range: Orosh Highlands

Geology
- Rock age: Cretaceous
- Mountain type: mountain
- Rock type: limestone

Mali i Zepës is a mountain located in the Orosh Highlands, in northeastern Albania. It rises to 1,967 m (6,453 ft) above sea level, overlooking the river valley of Fan i Vogël.

== Geology ==
The mountain displays a varied and rugged relief, shaped by a combination of geological and geomorphological processes. The valley below is characterized by fertile soils, which are widely used for agriculture by the local population.

A prominent landmark of the area is Guri i Nuses ("Bride’s Rock"), situated at about 1,700 metres (5,577 ft) above sea level. It is considered a natural monument of scientific interest and is associated with a well-known local legend.

According to oral tradition, during the medieval period and later Ottoman rule, young women from the region are said to have thrown themselves from the cliff to avoid capture by the invading armies and be forced into servitude in the Sultan's harem. The rock derives its name from this story.

== Climate and biodiversity ==
The mountain exhibits a noticeable transition in climate and vegetation over a relatively short vertical range. The lower valley has a Mediterranean climate, with hot, dry summers and mild, wet winters, supporting mainly shrub vegetation. As elevation increases, oak forests give way to coniferous and beech forests. At higher altitudes, the climate becomes more continental, with colder temperatures and prolonged winter snow cover.

The area is home to the critically endangered Balkan lynx.

== Hiking trail ==
A network of traditional footpaths, once used by local inhabitants, leads from the valley into the mountain. These routes traverse steep and sometimes exposed terrain, as well as open plateaus and forest tracks. The trails provide wide views of the surrounding landscape and access to several natural and historical sites, including Shpella e Batos and Qyteza e Batrave.

== See also ==
- List of mountains in Albania
