= Maja e Gjarprit =

Summit in Albania

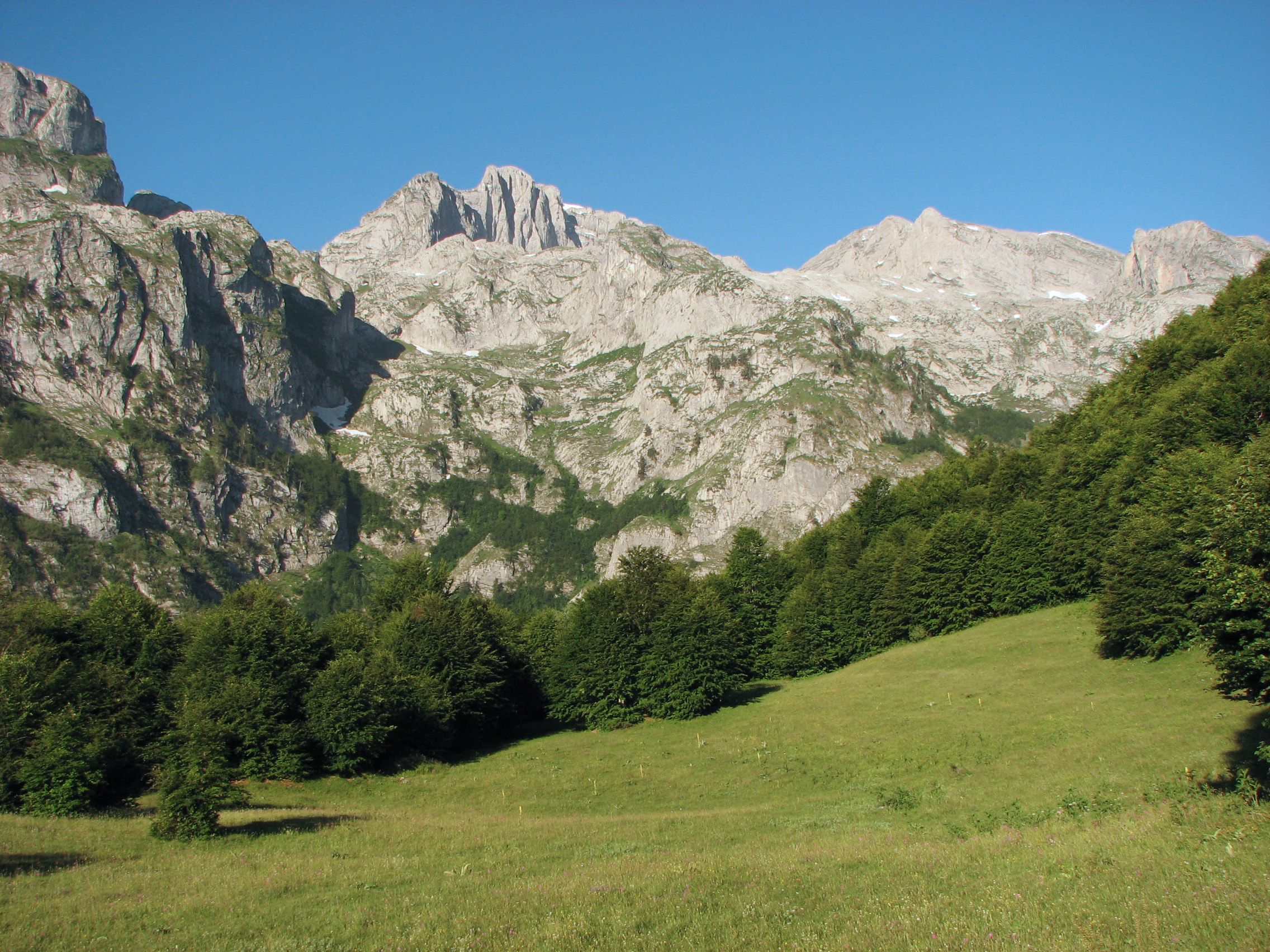

Highest point
- Elevation: 2,142 m (7,028 ft)
- Prominence: 90 m (300 ft)
- Isolation: 842 m (2,762 ft)
- Coordinates: 42°28′11″N 19°58′51″E

Naming
- English translation: Snake's Peak

Geography
- Location within Albania
- Country: Albania
- Region: Albanian Alps
- Municipality: Tropojë
- Parent range: Bjeshkët e Namuna

Geology
- Rock age: Mesozoic
- Mountain type: summit
- Rock type(s): dolomite, limestone

Maja e Gjarprit (lit. 'Snake's Peak') is a summit in the Accursed Mountains, located within Tropojë municipality, in northern Albania. The peak rises to an elevation of 2,142 m (7,028 ft) above sea level and forms part of the rugged high-mountain terrain characteristic of the Valbonë region.

== Geology ==
Maja e Gjarprit lies between the Çerem Valley to the northwest and the Millosh Valley to the southwest, the latter being a left tributary of Valbona Valley, into which the mountain also descends to the southeast.

The peak occupies a prominent position above the alpine landscape of the Dragobi meadows. It has the form of a sharp, pyramidal summit with steep, dissected ridges. Its western and northwestern ridge descends abruptly toward the valley of the Çerem stream, while the eastern ridge forms a deep escarpment approximately 600–700 meters above the Dragobi meadows. Toward the east, the mountain continues through the upper ridge of Gjarpri and further into the ridge of Rupë.

Maja e Gjarprit is composed almost entirely of Mesozoic dolomitic limestone. Its sharply defined ridges and steep slopes are the result of intensive tectonic folding and long-term karst erosion.

== Biodiversity ==
Vegetation is sparse above elevations of 1,500–1,600 meters, where plant cover is almost entirely absent. Only isolated stands of mountain pine occur at higher elevations. Below this zone, beech forests are more common, while oak shrubs grow along the lower eastern slopes.

== See also ==
- List of mountains in Albania
