= Guri i Muzhaqit =

Mountain in Albania

- Location within Albania

Highest point
- Elevation: 1,662 m (5,453 ft)
- Prominence: 210 m (690 ft)
- Isolation: 6.4 km (4.0 mi)
- Coordinates: 41°18′57″N 20°14′12″E

Geography
- Country: Albania
- Region: Central Mountain Region
- Municipality: Bulqizë
- Parent range: Çermenikë

Geology
- Rock age: Mesozoic
- Mountain type: mountain
- Rock type(s): limestone, flysch

Guri i Muzhaqit is a mountain located in the Çermenikë highlands, in Bulqizë municipality, eastern Albania. It rises to an elevation of 1,662 m (5,453 ft) above sea level.

== Geology ==
Guri i Muzhaqit forms part of the mountainous landscape of Çermenikë and lies within the upper catchment of the Rrapun river. To the northwest, it connects geomorphologically with the Martanesh Highlands. The mountain ridge is gently undulating and marked by numerous karst landforms.

The slopes are predominantly steep, giving the massif a rugged appearance. Numerous springs emerge around it, providing an important source of water for the Rrapun river and its tributaries.

The mountain is composed mainly of Mesozoic limestone, which rests upon underlying flysch formations. Karst processes have strongly influenced its relief, resulting in surface features such as fissures, sinkholes and uneven rocky terrain.

== Biodiversity ==
Guri i Muzhaqit is largely covered by beech forest (Fagus sylvatica), characteristic of the montane vegetation zone in eastern Albania.

== See also ==
- List of mountains in Albania
