= Rungajë =

Mountain in Albania

- Mali i Rungajës
- Location within Albania

Highest point
- Elevation: 1,945 m (6,381 ft)
- Prominence: 333 m (1,093 ft)
- Isolation: 10.1 km (6.3 mi)
- Coordinates: 40°30′04″N 20°32′53″E

Naming
- English translation: Snow Mound

Geography
- Country: Albania
- Region: Central Mountain Region
- Municipality: Korçë
- Parent range: Korçë Basin

Geology
- Rock age: Cretaceous
- Mountain type: mountain
- Rock type(s): limestone, flysch

Rungajë (lit. 'Snow Mound') is a mountain located near Vithkuq, in southeastern Albania. Rising to an elevation of 1,945 m (6,381 ft), it forms part of the mountainous belt that separates the Kolonjë basin from the upper catchment of the Osum river.

== Geology ==
Rungajë has the form of a compact massif with a highly rugged relief shaped by both karstic and glacial processes. The mountain is composed predominantly of Cretaceous limestone, locally interbedded with effusive volcanic rocks and flysch deposits.

Karst landforms are widespread and include sinkholes and other dissolution features, while glacial landforms such as cirques and moraine valleys are also present, indicating past alpine glaciation.

== Biodiversity ==
The lower and peripheral slopes are covered by mixed forests dominated by beech, conifers (particularly silver fir) and oak species. With increasing altitude, forest vegetation gives way to alpine grasslands, which are traditionally used for pastoral grazing.

== Natural resources ==
Copper deposits occur on the southeastern slopes near the village of Rehovë, where a mine and processing plant are located.

== See also ==
- List of mountains in Albania
