= Pallavërca =

Summit in Albania

- Maja e Pallavërcës
- Location within Albania

Highest point
- Elevation: 2,195 m (7,201 ft)
- Prominence: 430 m (1,410 ft)
- Isolation: 7.1 km (4.4 mi)
- Coordinates: 42°37′04″N 19°42′49″E

Geography
- Country: Albania
- Region: Albanian Alps
- Municipality: Malësi e Madhe
- Parent range: Accursed Mountains

Geology
- Rock age: Triassic
- Mountain type: summit
- Rock type(s): flysch, limestone

Pallavërca or Maja e Madhe is a summit in the northern Albanian Alps, forming part of the Zabel–Kershi i Djegum mountain ridge. The peak rises to approximately 2,195 m (7,201 ft) above sea level and lies within the broader Accursed Mountains range, near the upper valleys of Vermosh and Harushë.

== Geology ==
Pallavërca is part of a structurally distinct ridge extending along the left side of the Vermosh Valley, marking the extreme northern limit of Albania’s mountainous terrain. The ridge begins to the east with Maja e Zabelit (2,130 m), crosses the tectonic–erosional saddle of Qafa e Mojanit (2,126 m) and rises sharply toward Maja e Marlulës (2,188 m) and Maja e Madhe (2,195 m), concluding southward with Kershi i Djegum.

The Zabel–Kershi i Djegum ridge is developed within a carbonate–flysch structural zone linked to the Gashi tectonic unit of the Albanian Alps. Its eastern slopes are defined by pronounced structural breaks along the contact between limestone and flysch formations. Locally interbedded effusive volcanic rocks within the carbonate sequence have enabled the formation of contact depressions, notably those of Smutirogë and Sefercë.

At elevations above 1,700–2,000 meters, the relief surrounding Pallavërca displays well-developed glacial landforms, such as cirques, glacial trough valleys and nivo-karst features. Numerous short mountain streams originate in these cirques and have deeply incised the slopes, particularly along the western flank.

== Biodiversity ==
Vegetation cover on the slopes of the summit is relatively rich compared to other areas of the Albanian Alps. Forest belts are dominated by silver fir and the presence of Bosnian pine (Pinus heldreichii) at higher elevations. Alpine grasslands are widespread above the upper forest limit, with the treeline varying according to slope exposure.

On the south-facing slopes, the upper forest limit reaches approximately 1,700–1,800 meters, whereas on the north-facing side it descends to about 1,500–1,600 meters. Above the treeline, extensive alpine pastures are developed, including those of Sefercë, Smutirogë, Lugu i Dolit and Përbiçë, which are among the most significant high-mountain grazing areas in the region.

== See also ==
- List of mountains in Albania
