= Guri i Kamjes =

Natural monument in Albania

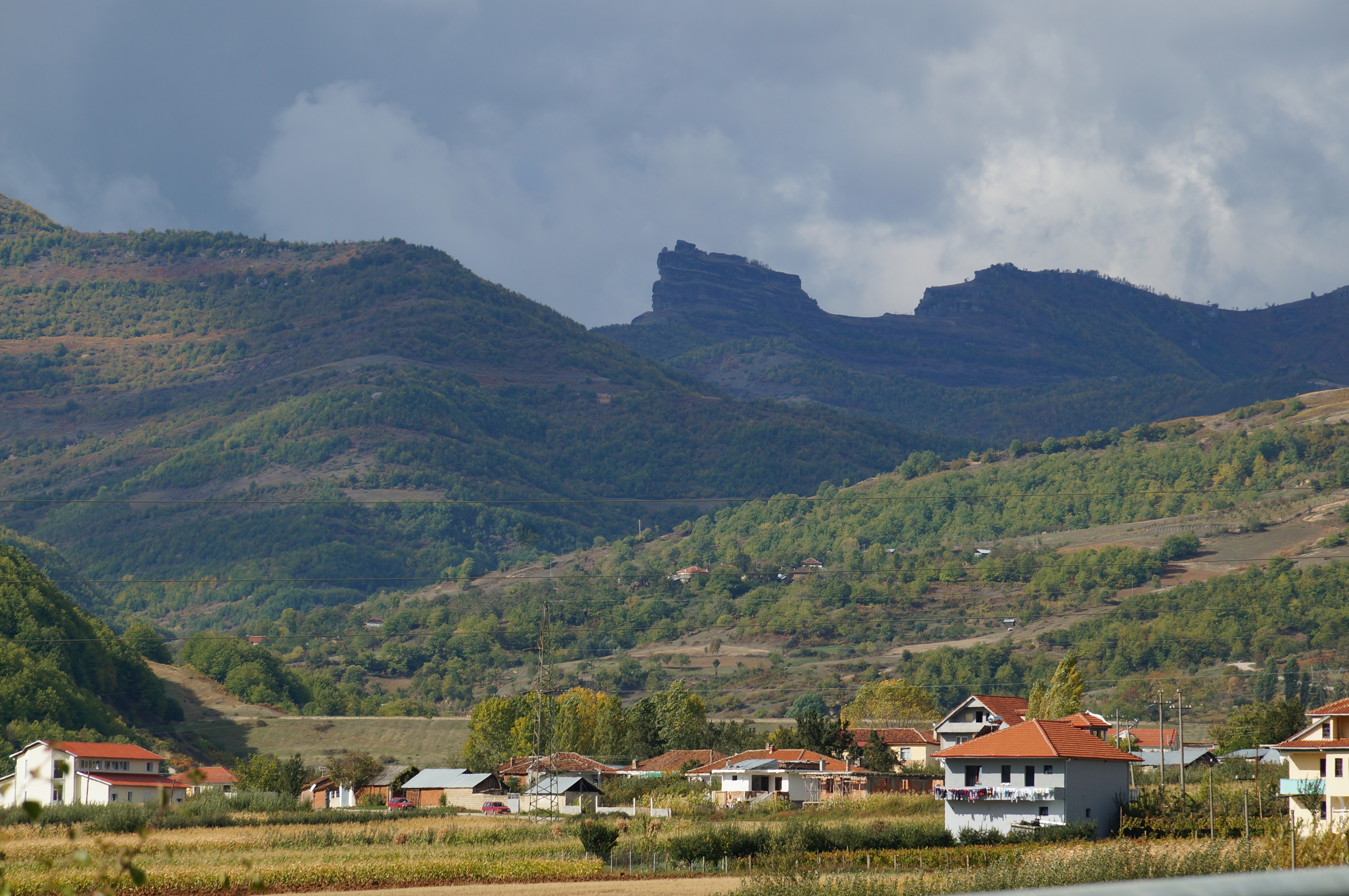
- Guri i Kamjes near Pogradec

Highest point
- Elevation: 1,455 m (4,774 ft)
- Prominence: 0 m (0 ft)
- Isolation: 14 m (46 ft)
- Coordinates: 40°50′19″N 20°36′45″E

Naming
- English translation: Wealth Rock

Geography
- Location within Albania
- Country: Albania
- Region: Central Mountain Region
- Municipality: Pogradec
- Parent range: Gora Highlands

Geology
- Mountain type: peak
- Rock type(s): conglomerate, molasse

Guri i Kamjes (lit. 'Wealth Rock') is a natural monument located on the border between the highlands of Mokra and Gora, in eastern Albania. Situated in the vicinity of the Lipovë Pass, it is considered a notable tourist attraction in the region.

== Geology ==
A rocky peak rising at an elevation of 1,455 m (4,774 ft), it is composed of conglomerates and molasse sandstones. The sandstone rocks have resisted erosion, resulting in a unique microrelief formation shaped by atmospheric agents such as rain, snow and wind. The peak appears like an island rising above its surrounding area and from afar, it resembles a large ship.

== See also ==
- List of mountains in Albania
