= Rrëza e Kanalit =

Mountain in Albania

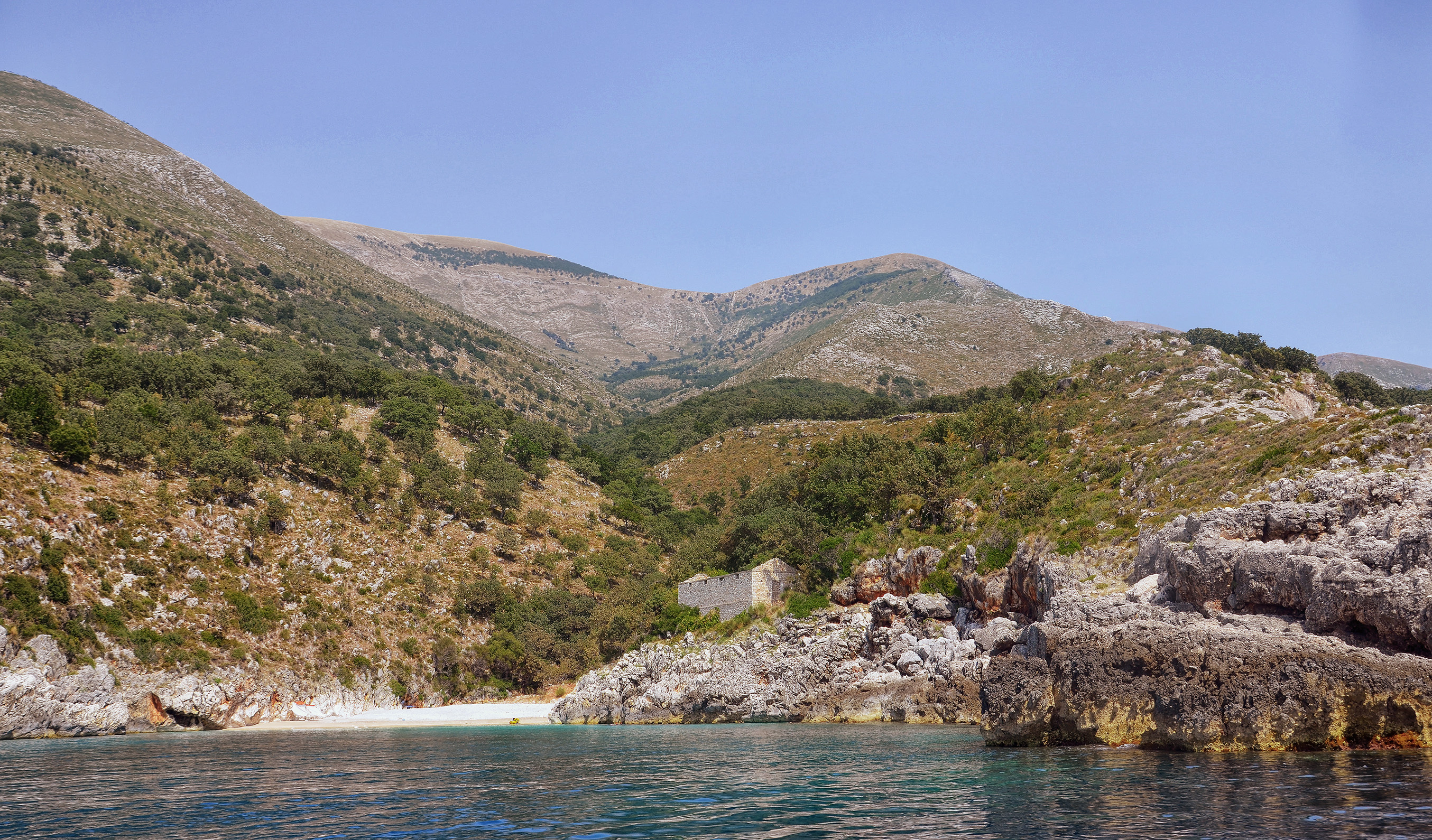
- Rrëza e Kanalit seen from Shëndreu Bay

Highest point
- Elevation: 1,499 m (4,918 ft)
- Prominence: 472 m (1,549 ft)
- Isolation: 5.9 km (3.7 mi)
- Coordinates: 40°13′31″N 19°31′32″E

Naming
- English translation: Channel's Radius

Geography
- Location within Albania
- Country: Albania
- Region: Southern Mountain Region
- Municipality: Vlorë
- Parent range: Ceraunian Mountains

Geology
- Rock age: Cretaceous
- Mountain type: mountain
- Rock type: limestone

Rrëza e Kanalit (lit. 'Channel's Radius') is a mountain located on the Ionian Coast of Albania, within the boundaries of Vlorë municipality. It stretches between the Karaburun Peninsula in the northwest and Llogara Pass in the southeast, at a length of 23 km (14 mi) and a width of 3–7 km (1.9–4.3 mi). Its highest peak, Shën Iliu, reaches a height of 1,499 m (4,918 ft).

== Geology ==
Composed of thick limestone layers from the Cretaceous period, Rrëza e Kanalit exhibits significant karst processes and phenomena, with geologic similaritites to the tectonic landform of Sazan island. Its terrain gradually rises from the northwest to the southeast, culminating at the highest peak, Shën Iliu 1,499 m (4,918 ft).

== See also ==
- List of mountains in Albania
