= Lungara =

Mountain in Albania

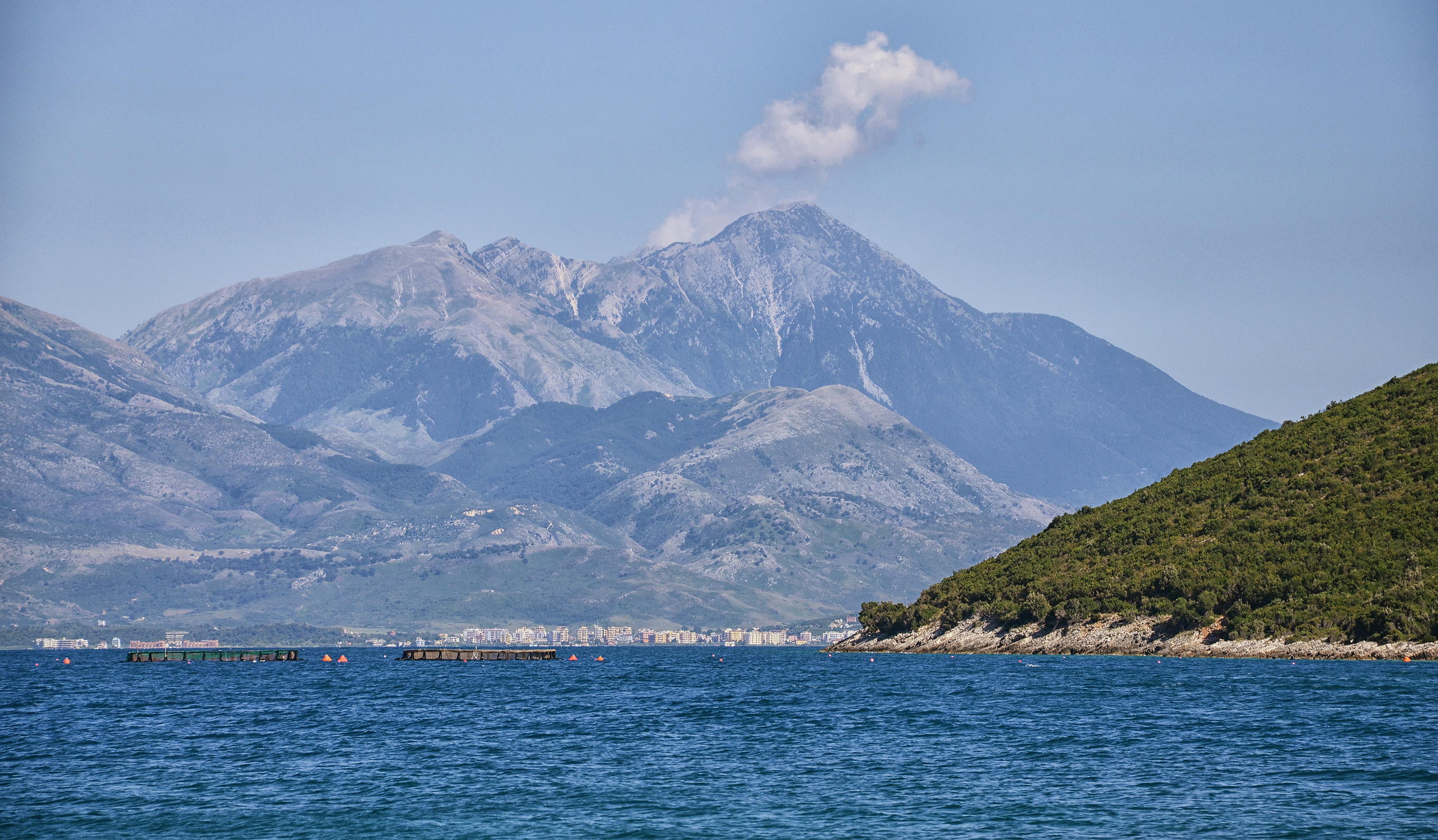
- Lungara seen from a distance

Highest point
- Elevation: 1,863 m (6,112 ft)
- Prominence: 701 m (2,300 ft)
- Isolation: 6.6 km (4.1 mi)
- Coordinates: 40°16′26″N 19°37′05″E

Geography
- Location within Albania
- Country: Albania
- Region: Southern Mountain Region
- Municipality: Vlorë
- Parent range: Ceraunian Mountains

Geology
- Rock age: Mesozoic
- Mountain type: mountain
- Rock type(s): limestone, dolomite, flysch

Lungara is a massif in southwestern Albania, situated between the Bay of Vlorë to the west and Shushicë Valley to the east, further extending from Shëngjergj Pass in the southeast to Drashovicë in the northwest.

Its highest peak, Qiramanga, rises to 1,863 m (6,112 ft) above sea level. Other peaks include Mazhari (1,182 m) and Tragjas (1,281 m).

== Geology ==
The main ridge and upper slopes of the massif are largely composed of Mesozoic limestone and dolomite, while the lower sections, up to 600 meters on both flanks, are made up of flysch and molasse deposits. These softer sedimentary formations are highly susceptible to landslides, particularly in the Jonufra sector.

Karst landforms are widespread across the limestone belt and contribute significantly to the rugged relief.

The western slope is markedly steep and heavily dissected, shaped by a major tectonic fault line running from Dukat to Uji i Ftohtë. Because of this structural boundary, the mountain drops abruptly toward the bay. By contrast, the eastern slope is broader and descends more gradually onto the valley.

== Biodiversity ==
Vegetation is dominated primarily of Mediterranean shrubland. At higher elevations, fir forests become more common, supplemented by smaller tracts of pine. The massif serves as an important seasonal grazing area, providing pasture during summer and winter.

Beginning in 1966, large sections of the western slopes were cleared of their native scrub vegetation and converted into one of the country's most extensive agricultural regions, cultivated mostly with citrus groves, olive trees and a variety of fruit crops.

The western foothills and coastal margins are distinguished by a succession of small coves, pebble beaches and steep rocky escarpments. This striking landscape has contributed to the area being frequently visited by tourists and becoming a popular attraction of the Albanian Riviera.

== See also ==
- List of mountains in Albania
