= Mali i Shejtit =

Mountain in Albania

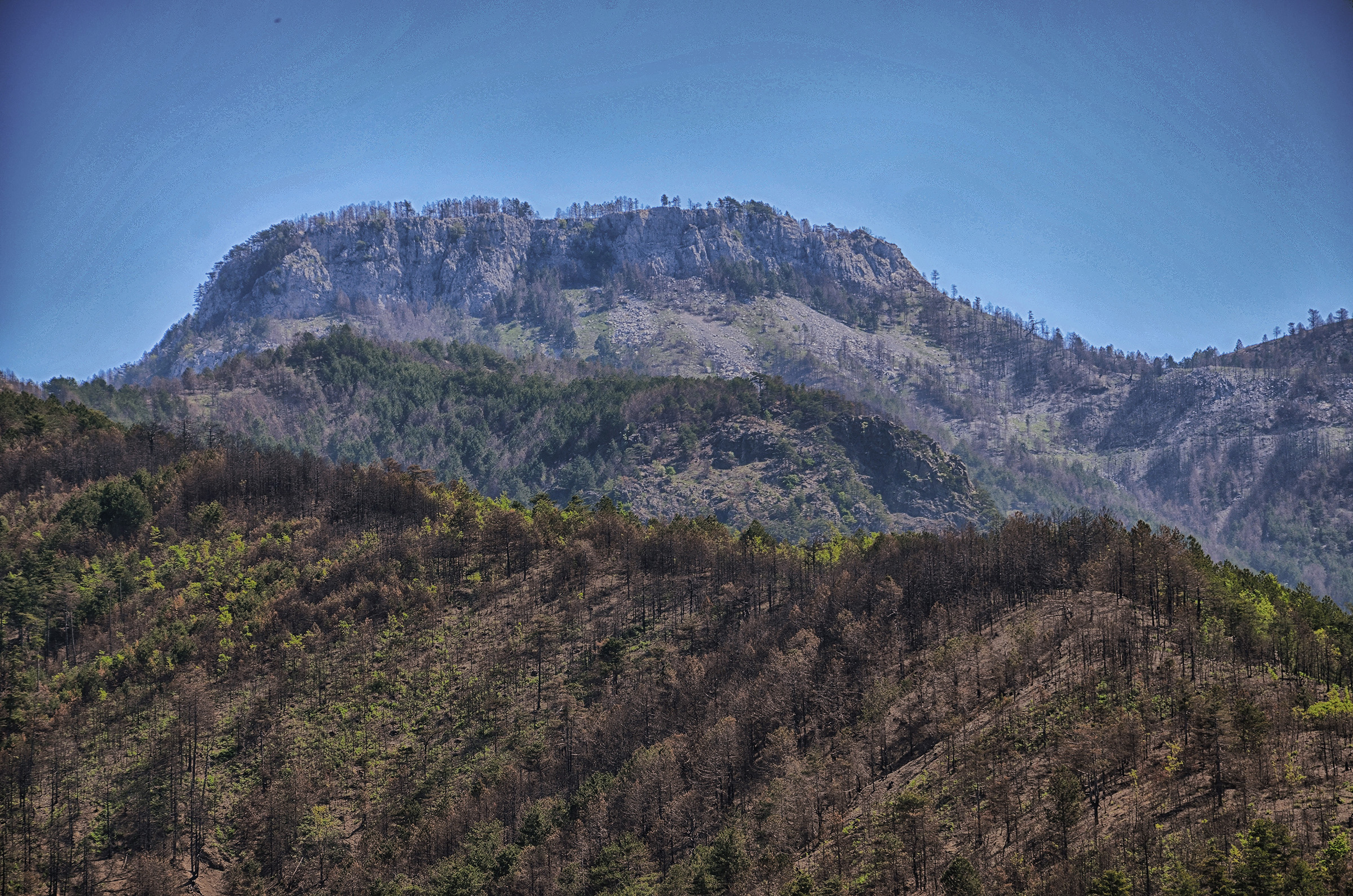
- View of the mountain from Orosh

Highest point
- Elevation: 1,583 m (5,194 ft)
- Prominence: 142 m (466 ft)
- Isolation: 1.3 km (0.81 mi)
- Coordinates: 41°52′43″N 20°11′15″E

Naming
- English translation: Holy Mountain

Geography
- Location within Albania
- Country: Albania
- Region: Central Mountain Region
- Municipality: Mirditë, Mat
- Parent range: Pukë–Mirditë Highlands

Geology
- Rock age: Cretaceous
- Mountain type: mountain
- Rock type: limestone

Mali i Shejtit (lit. 'Holy Mountain') is a mountain situated along the administrative boundary between Mirditë and Mat municipalities, in east-central Albania. Its highest peak, Maja e Zezit, rises to an elevation of 1,583 m (5,194 ft) above sea level.

== Geography ==
Integrated within the alpine pastures of Orosh, the mountain occupies a prominent position between several important river basins. To the southeast lie the upper valleys of the Uraka River and Mollë e Lurës and to the northwest stretches the valley of Fan i Vogël.

From the northeast, beyond the pass of Shkalla e Fanit, the ridge continues toward Maja e Zezit. On the southwest, the relief drops abruptly in the direction of the mining village of Kurbnesh.

== Geology ==
Mali i Shejtit is composed primarily of Cretaceous limestone, typical of the Albanian Alpine structural zone. In its northwestern side, effusive (volcanic) rocks locally emerge beneath the limestone cover.

Geomorphologically, the mountain is characterized by a well-developed karst plateau situated at elevations between 1,300 and 1,400 meters. The plateau is intensely dissected by classic karst landforms, including sinkholes (dolines), closed depressions, funnel-shaped hollows and karst fields separated by rounded residual hills.

Much of the precipitation rapidly percolates through fissures and cavities in the limestone bedrock, limiting the development of permanent surface streams.

== Biodiversity ==
Nearly the entire mountain is covered by dense forest, dominated mostly by European beech (Fagus sylvatica) and several pine species. These woodlands play a significant ecological role by stabilizing the karst terrain, regulating water infiltration and sustaining local biodiversity.

== See also ==
- List of mountains in Albania
