= Ujeza =

Summit in Albania

- Maja e Ujezës
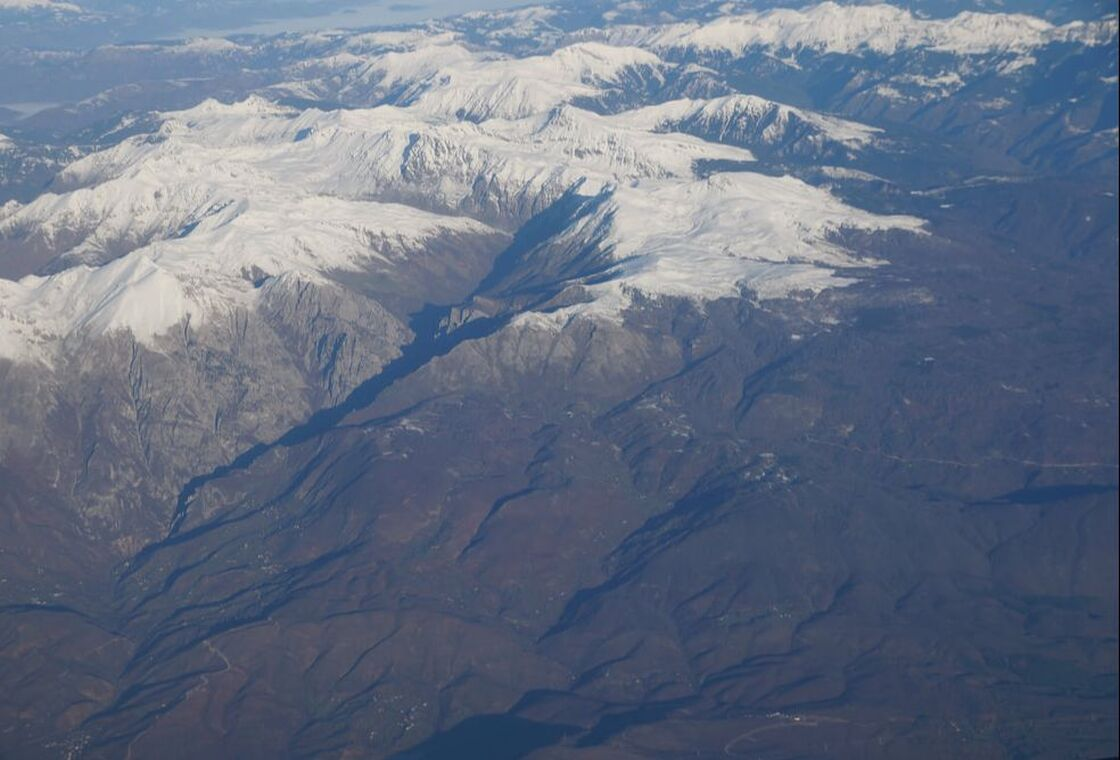
- Aerial image of Maja e Ujezës and the Shkëlzen massif

Highest point
- Elevation: 1,821 m (5,974 ft)
- Prominence: 45 m (148 ft)
- Isolation: 494 m (1,621 ft)
- Coordinates: 42°27′40″N 20°10′26″E

Naming
- English translation: Muzzle

Geography
- Location within Albania
- Country: Albania
- Region: Albanian Alps
- Municipality: Tropojë
- Parent range: Accursed Mountains

Geology
- Mountain type: summit

Ujeza (lit. 'Muzzle'), also known as Ujaza, is a summit in the Accursed Mountains, located on the border region between Albania and Kosovo. It rises to an elevation of 1,821 m (5,974 ft) above sea level.

== Geography ==
Ujeza forms part of the Accursed Mountains, a subrange of the Dinaric Alps extending across northern Albania, northwestern Kosovo and eastern Montenegro. The peak is situated near the village of Padesh, within Tropojë municipality, in northern Albania.

From the summit, hikers enjoy panoramic views of nearby Mount Shkëlzen (2,404 m), which stands prominently to the west.

== History ==
The area around Ujeza was affected by armed conflict during the Kosovo War, when its surrounding terrain saw significant fighting and was contaminated with landmines. This has contributed to the peak being less frequently visited compared to other mountains in the region.

== Climbing route ==
The most common trail to the summit starts near Kështjella, in Rrasa e Koshares, accessible from the village of Botushë, about 20 km from Gjakovë. The hike begins from a forested parking area and follows an unpaved road through woodland and past former military installations. Shepherd huts are located roughly 8 km along the route, after which the final ascent to the summit takes about one hour.

== See also ==
- List of mountains in Albania
