= Mali me Gropa =

Mountain in Albania

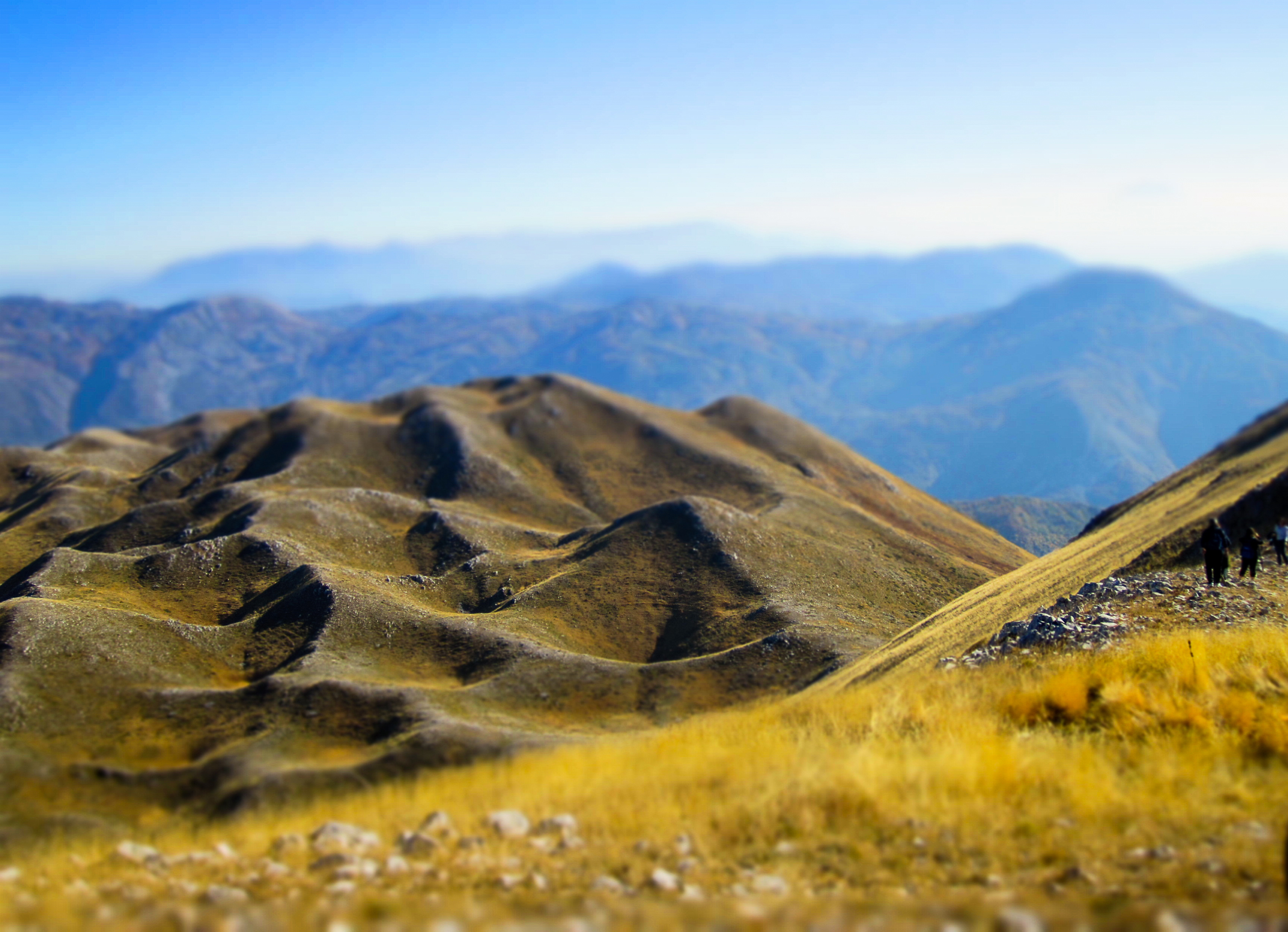
- View from Priska Pass eastwards towards Mali me Gropa

Highest point
- Elevation: 1,818 m (5,965 ft)
- Prominence: 518 m (1,699 ft)
- Isolation: 250 m (820 ft)
- Coordinates: 41°22′24″N 20°01′59″E

Naming
- English translation: Holes Mountain

Geography
- Location within Albania
- Country: Albania
- Region: Central Mountain Region
- Municipality: Tirana
- Parent range: Skanderbeg Mountains

Geology
- Rock age: Mesozoic
- Mountain type: massif
- Rock type(s): limestone, flysch

Mali me Gropa (lit. 'Holes Mountain') is a massif situated in central Albania, east of Tirana municipality, wedged between Dajti Mountain National Park to the west and the Martanesh highlands to the east. It forms part of the Mali me Gropa-Bizë-Martanesh Nature Park, within the Western Ranges. Its highest peak, Maja e Mecekut, reaches a height of 1,818 m (5,965 ft).

== Geology ==
The massif consists primarily of heavily decomposed Mesozoic limestone and is distinguished for its extensive presence of karst processes and formations, most notably, the prevalence of funnels in the shape of small and large pits, which have given it its name. Along the sides of the massif, where the limestone meets the flysch, numerous karst springs emerge, contributing to the water supply of the Erzen river, as well as the upper branches of the Mat and Ishëm rivers.

== Biodiversity ==
Although the vegetation is relatively scarce, summer pastures and sporadic patches of beech trees are found, mainly around the eastern and northern confines. In recent decades, efforts have been made to introduce artificial afforestation, particularly with the usage of pine trees.

Wildlife in the area includes wild pigeons and mountain cranes, further enhancing the natural diversity of the region.

== See also ==
- List of mountains in Albania
