= Mali i Konjakut =

Mountain in Albania

- Location within Albania

Highest point
- Elevation: 1,140 m (3,740 ft)
- Prominence: 155 m (509 ft)
- Isolation: 2.96 km (1.84 mi)
- Coordinates: 40°02′40″N 19°54′22″E

Geography
- Country: Albania
- Region: Southern Mountain Region
- Municipality: Himarë
- Parent range: Ceraunian Mountains

Geology
- Rock age(s): Cretaceous, Paleogene, Neogene
- Mountain type: mountain
- Rock type(s): limestone, flysch

Mali i Konjakut is a massif in southern Albania, forming the central and most elevated section of the Lavan–Konjak–Galisht mountain chain. Rising between the Ionian coastal belt and the inland valleys of Delvinë and Borsh, it constitutes one of the dominant limestone formations of the Ceraunian Mountains range.

== Geology ==
Konjaku lies between Lavan to the southeast and Galisht to the northwest, reaching its highest point at Maja e Piksës (1,140 m) and Maja e Lugjeve (1,046 m). Along with Galisht, it forms the most elevated section of the chain, extending 18 km in length and 5–6 km in width.

The mountain is composed primarily of Cretaceous limestone, forming a prominent anticline, with Paleogene–Neogene flysch deposits appearing along the outer margins.

Its western slopes descend abruptly toward the Ionian shoreline and the valley of the Borsh river, whereas the eastern side declines more gradually into the upper Kalasa valley and the Delvinë basin. The summit ridge is comparatively broad and locally flattened, creating karstic plateaus known as ara ("fields").

== Biodiversity ==
Vegetation is generally sparse, especially above 800–900 m. The lower slopes are covered by Mediterranean maquis, more widespread on the western side, including species such as strawberry tree, mastic, phillyrea, myrtle, laurel and oleander, while carob appears only sporadically.

At middle elevations, roughly between 250–300 m and 800–900 m, the massif is characterized by a broad belt of valonia oak, which makes up some of its densest and most continuous stands on the western slopes. Across stream valleys, particularly around the Borsh Gorge, are found scattered patches of riparian woodland with mature trees.

== See also ==
- List of mountains in Albania
