= Biga e Gimajve =

Mountain in Albania

- Location within Albania

Highest point
- Elevation: 2,232 m (7,323 ft)
- Prominence: 424 m (1,391 ft)
- Isolation: 5.9 km (3.7 mi)
- Coordinates: 42°19′53″N 19°43′30″E

Geography
- Country: Albania
- Region: Albanian Alps
- Municipality: Shkodër

Geology
- Rock age: Triassic
- Mountain type: mountain
- Rock type(s): limestone, dolomite

Biga e Gimajve is a mountain located in the municipality of Shkodër, in northern Albania. Part of the eastern range of the Albanian Alps, it rises at an elevation of 2,232 m (7,323 ft) above sea level.

== Geology ==
The mountain is situated between the Shala Valley to the east, Kir Valley to the south and the basin of Përroi i Thatë to the northwest. Geologically, Biga e Gimajve is composed almost entirely of Triassic limestone and dolomite, which form two prominent conical summits, Maja e Bardhë and Maja e Përhime.

The eastern and northwestern slopes descend steeply into the valleys of Shala (Kaprej area) and Troshan (a left tributary of Përroi i Thatë), while the southern slope forms a continuous rocky escarpment toward the headwaters of the Kir Valley. To the north, the massif continues in the direction of Mali i Mardomit (2,180 m) and to the southwest into Maja e Madhe (2,011 m), while to the south it connects with Maja e Boshit (1,638 m).

== Hydrography ==
Biga e Gimajve constitutes an important hydrographic node, separating the drainage basins of the Shala, Kir and Përroi i Thatë river systems. The northwestern and northeastern slopes are shaped by glacial cirques, which descend in stepped formations into the valley of the Kaprej stream, a right tributary of the Shala River.

== Biodiversity ==
Vegetation varies by exposure. The southern and eastern slopes are covered mainly by oak, while the northwestern slope is dominated by beech forest, reflecting cooler and more humid conditions.

== See also ==
- List of mountains in Albania
