= Arithi =

Mountain in Albania

- Mali i Arithit
- Location within Albania

Highest point
- Elevation: 1,981 m (6,499 ft)
- Prominence: 377 m (1,237 ft)
- Isolation: 7.8 km (4.8 mi)
- Coordinates: 41°34′32″N 20°18′39″E

Naming
- English translation: Upright like a bear

Geography
- Country: Albania
- Region: Central Mountain Region
- Municipality: Pukë
- Parent range: Pukë-Mirditë Highlands

Geology
- Mountain type: mountain
- Rock type: limestone

Arithi (lit. 'Upright like a bear') is a massif located in east-central Albania, east of Bulqizë municipality. Its highest peak, Maja e Arithit, rises to an elevation of 1,981 m (6,499 ft) above sea level.

== Geology ==
Arithi is composed almost entirely of limestone and is characterized by folded geological structures that give the massif the form of a pronounced monocline ridge. From its central summit, the ridge slopes gradually northward and southward, descending into the valleys of the Murra and Bulqizë streams.

In the southern part of the massif, between the villages of Peladhi and Valikardhë, the ridge narrows into a pronounced elevated spine that rises nearly 1,000 meters above the surrounding landscape. This section includes the secondary peak, Maja e Temlit (1,703 m).

The eastern slope descends steeply into a lithological terrace lying between 900 m and 1,200 m in elevation, developed between the villages of Kovashicë and Lishan. Below this terrace, the relief gradually becomes more subdued as it extends towards the Black Drin valley.

== See also ==
- List of mountains in Albania
