= Maja e Boshit =

Mountain in Albania

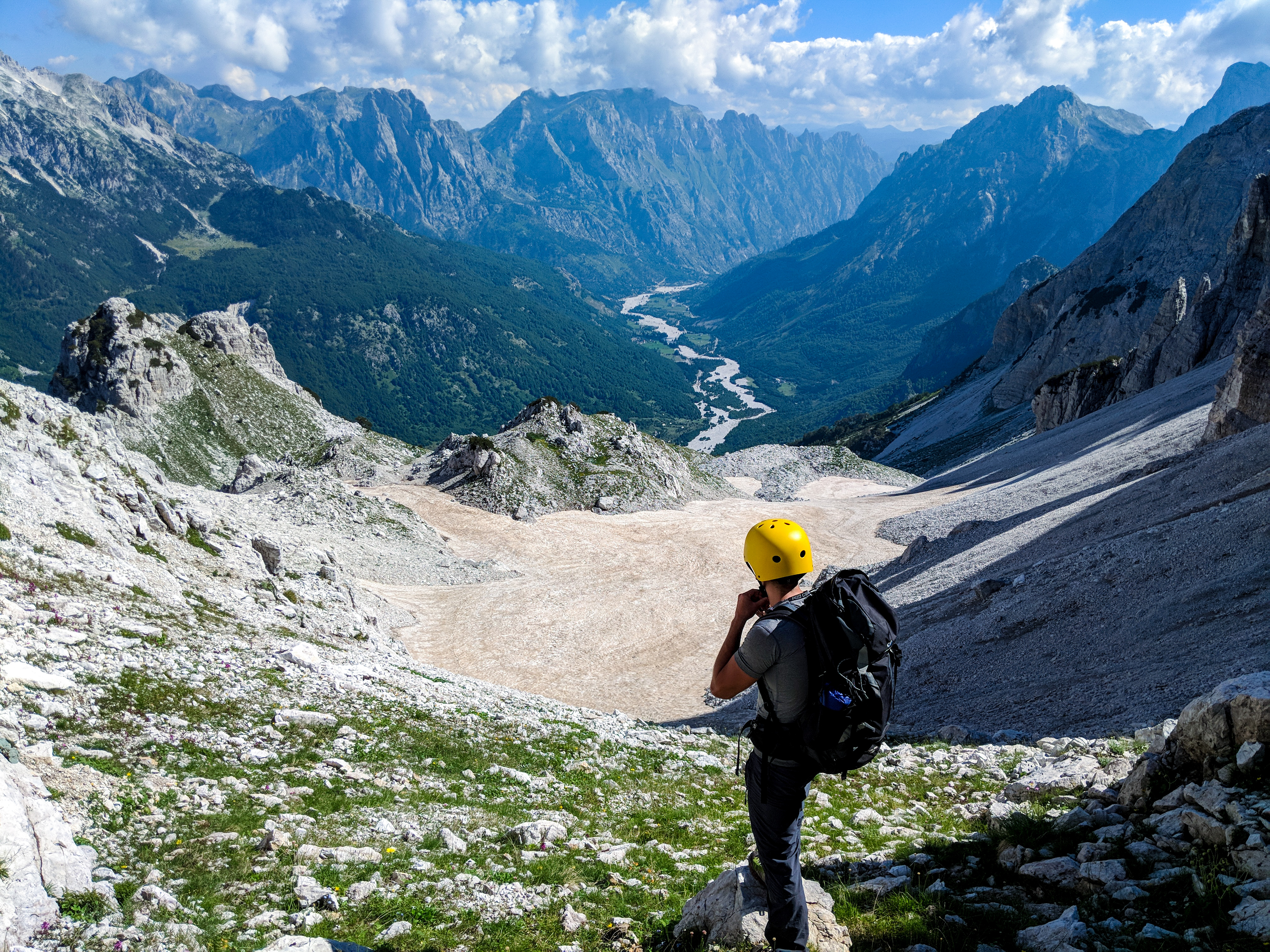
- View of Valbona Valley as seen from Maja e Boshit

Highest point
- Elevation: 2,416 m (7,927 ft)
- Prominence: 283 m (928 ft)
- Isolation: 2,953 m (9,688 ft)
- Coordinates: 42°23′18″N 19°51′48″E

Naming
- English translation: Empty Peak

Geography
- Location within Albania
- Country: Albania
- Region: Albanian Alps
- Municipality: Tropojë
- Parent range: Accursed Mountains

Geology
- Mountain type: summit

Maja e Boshit (lit. 'Empty Peak') is a prominent summit in the Accursed Mountains range, in northern Albania. Rising at an elevation of 2,416 m (7,927 ft), it is distinguished by its dome-like shape and positioning as a hydrographic junction for the watersheds of Shala, Valbona and Nikaj.

Situated west of the Zhaborret ridgeline and east of Maja e Rukës (1,620 m), it stands out as the only peak in the Albanian Alps that offers panoramic views over three remote valleys – Theth, Valbona and Curraj i Epërm – acting as a convergence point between them.

The nearby hiking trail of Rragam is a popular tourist attraction.

== Climbing route ==
The ascent to Maja e Boshit is considered relatively challenging as it includes rocky sections where the use of hands may be necessary.

The route generally starts within Valbona Valley, from the area of Fusha e Gjesë at an elevation of about 949 meters (3,114 ft). From this point, marked trails lead toward Qafa e Zhaborres. After crossing the pass, the trail descends briefly before the final climb to the summit.

The total round-trip distance is approximately 18.4 kilometers (11.4 mi), with an overall elevation gain of about 1,587 meters (5,207 ft). The hike typically takes around twelve hours to complete.

== See also ==
- List of mountains in Albania
