= Gavni =

Summit in Albania

- 16 Tetori
- Location within Albania

Highest point
- Elevation: 2,530 m (8,300 ft)
- Prominence: 338 m (1,109 ft)
- Isolation: 1.6 km (0.99 mi)
- Coordinates: 42°23′43″N 19°54′59″E

Geography
- Country: Albania
- Region: Albanian Alps
- Municipality: Tropojë
- Parent range: Accursed Mountains

Geology
- Rock age: Triassic
- Mountain type: summit
- Rock type(s): limestone, dolomite

Gavni is a summit in the Accursed Mountains of northern Albania. Rising to an elevation of 2,530 m (8,300 ft) above sea level, it forms part of the Zhaborret ridgeline, extending between Valbona Valley and the Nikaj–Mërtur highlands.

The summit was formerly known as 16 Tetori, commemorating the birth date of Albanian communist leader, Enver Hoxha.

== Geology ==
Gavni is characterized by a rugged alpine relief composed predominantly of Triassic limestone, with steep rocky slopes and sharp ridges. The upper sections are largely barren, offering limited vegetation cover.

== Climbing route ==
The summit is considered one of the more challenging climbs in the Albanian Alps due to its rugged terrain and the absence of clearly marked trails in some sections.

One traditional route begins in Dragobi. The ascent proceeds through the valley of Mutinë, passing alpine pastures and shepherd huts before reaching Qafa e Droçës. From there, climbers follow steep ridges and exposed slopes toward the summit.

An alternative route approaches the summit from Curraj i Epërm. The trail passes through Buni i Ziqit, then crosses Qafa e Çetinës, continuing toward the cirques known as Grykat e Hapëta below the summit basin. At this point, climbers ascend the western face and the ridge near the summit.

The round-trip hike requires about ten hours, covering 16 kilometers with an elevation gain of roughly 2,200 meters.

== See also ==
- List of mountains in Albania
