= Hajdari =

Hajdari is an Albanian surname. Notable people with this surname include:

- Adrian Hajdari (born 2000), Macedonian footballer
- Albian Hajdari (born 2003), Swiss footballer
- Arsen Hajdari (born 1989), Albanian football player
- Arti Hajdari (born 1993), Kosovan basketball player
- Azem Hajdari (1963–1998), Albanian leader of the student movement in 1990–1991 that led to the fall of communism in Albania
- Blerti Hajdari (born 1990), Albanian footballer
- Ermal Hajdari (born 1992), Swedish footballer
- Fiton Hajdari (born 1991), Kosovar footballer
- Gentjan Hajdari (born 1975), Albanian footballer
- Musa Hajdari (born 1987), Kosovan middle-distance track athlete
- Rozeta Hajdari (born 1974), Kosovar economist and politician
- Rudina Hajdari (born 1987), Albanian-American politician
