= Grykat e Hapëta =

Mountain in Albania

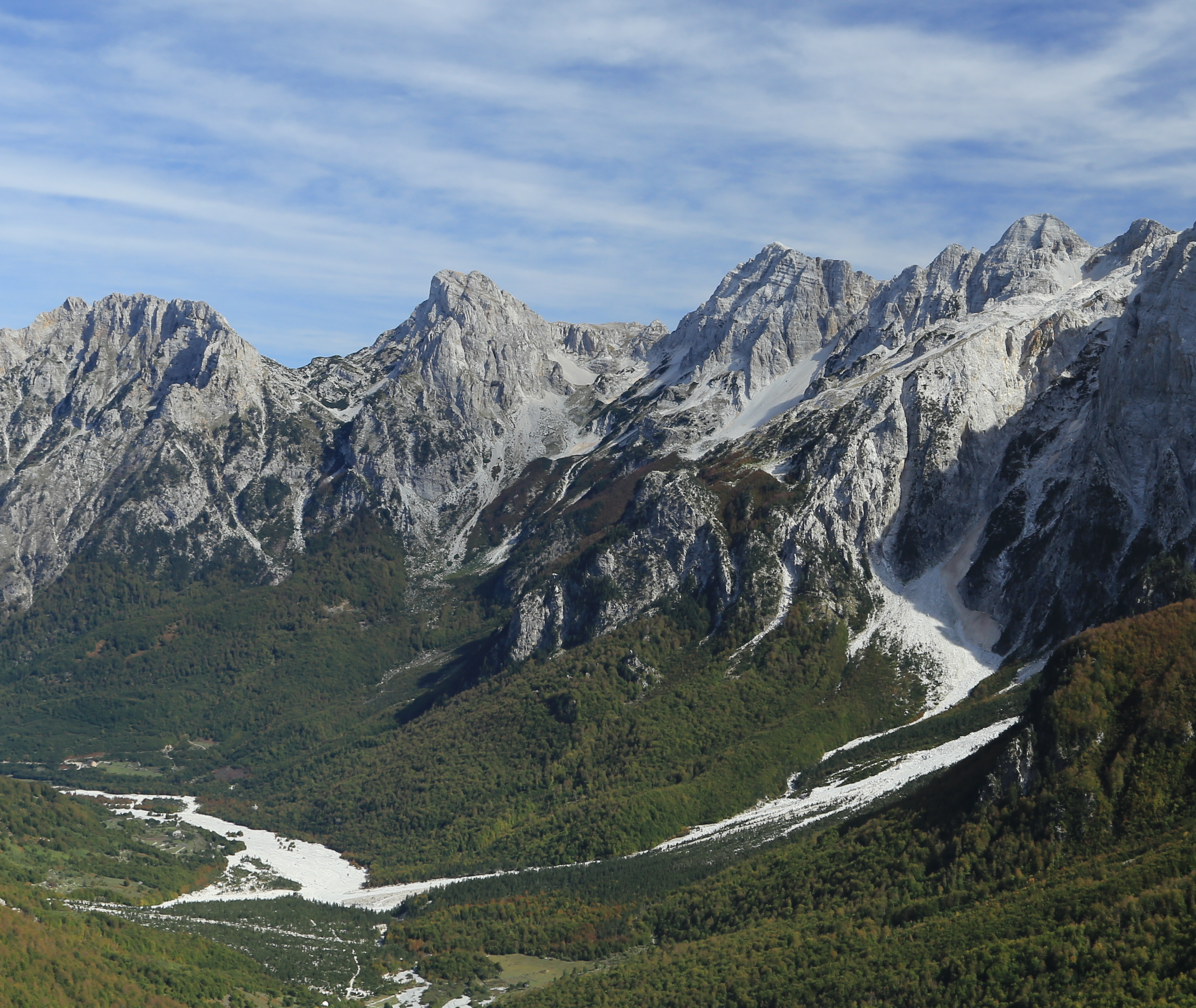
- Grykat e Hapëta seen from Valbona Valley

Highest point
- Elevation: 2,625 m (8,612 ft)
- Prominence: 822 m (2,697 ft)
- Isolation: 8.187 km (5.087 mi)
- Coordinates: 42°24′31″N 19°54′15″E

Naming
- English translation: Open Gorges

Geography
- Location within Albania
- Country: Albania
- Region: Albanian Alps
- Municipality: Tropojë
- Parent range: Accursed Mountains
- Borders on: Maja e Brijasit

Geology
- Rock age: Triassic
- Mountain type: massif
- Rock type(s): limestone, dolomite

Grykat e Hapëta (lit. 'Open Gorges') is a massif in the Accursed Mountains, part of the Zhaborret ridgeline, within the limits of Tropojë municipality. Its highest peak, Maja e Grykës së Hapët, reaches a height of 2,625 m (8,612 ft), making it the highest peak in the Zhaborret ridgeline.

== Etymology ==
The main summit is named Maja e Madhe by the inhabitants of Valbona, whereas the inhabitants of Curraj i Epërm call it Maja e Lugbatit. Both have been documented as such by mountaineering expert Aleksandër Bojaxhi during his expeditions to the area between 1962–1979. The newer name appearing on maps is a more recent adaptation.

== Geology ==
The massif lies between the upper part of the Valbona Valley in the north and the Nikaj Valley in the south, continuing along the Zhaborret ridgeline from the west and the pass of Droçë in the southeast, which separates it from Mali i Hekurave. Composed primarily of Triassic limestone and dolomite, it has the shape of a conical trunk with very steep slopes, forming cliffs 700-800 m deep. Around its core rise four other peaks at a height of over 2400 m. Grykat e Hapëta are mostly devoid of vegetation.

== See also ==
- List of mountains in Albania
