= Brijasi =

Summit in Albanian mountain range

- Maja e Brijasit
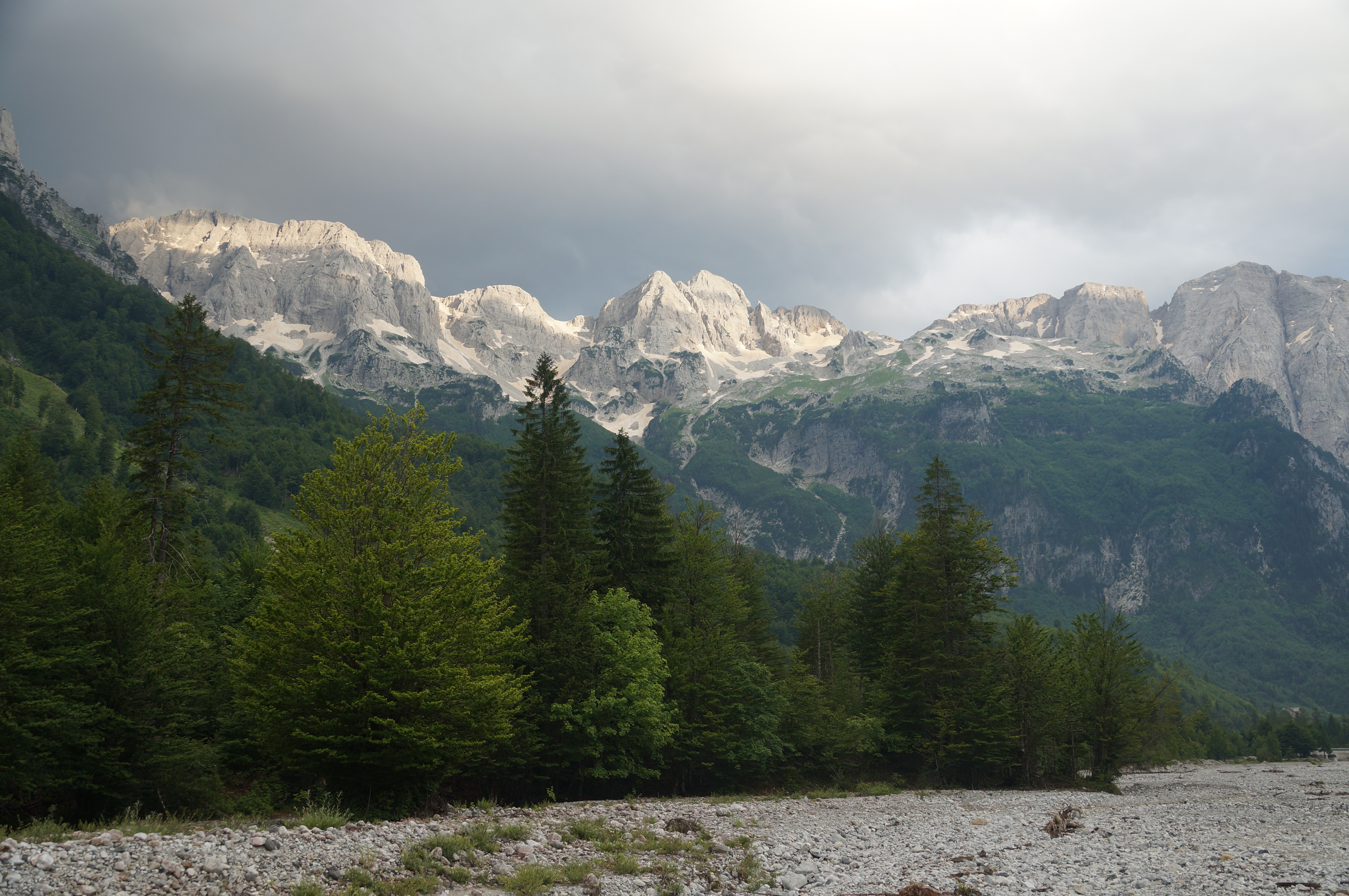
- Brijasi seen front and center

Highest point
- Elevation: 2,567 m (8,422 ft)
- Prominence: 160 m (520 ft)
- Isolation: 1,366 m (4,482 ft)
- Coordinates: 42.401416°N 19.889410°E

Geography
- Location within Albania
- Location: Albania
- Region: Albanian Alps
- Municipality: Tropojë
- Parent range: Accursed Mountains

Geology
- Rock age: Triassic
- Mountain type: summit
- Rock type(s): limestone, dolomite

Brijasi, also known as Briaset, is a summit in the Accursed Mountains range, in northern Albania. Rising to an elevation of 2,567 m (8,422 ft), it is one of the highest points of the Zhaborret ridgeline.

== Geology ==
Approaching Valbona Valley, one of the most striking features on the left side of its landscape is a long ridge of peaks that form part of the Accursed Mountains range, known locally as Zhaborret. This segment of the range stretches for about 13 kilometers and includes more than ten summits, all rising above 2,400 meters.

Among them, Brijasi (2,567 m) stands out. Its north face has a distinct rhomboid shape, rising nearly 900 meters in height and spanning a similar width. Positioned next to Grykat e Hapëta (2,625 m), this dramatic rock wall gives the mountain a recognizable profile within the ridge.

Still unmarked on most maps and not frequently visited, Brijasi has started to attract the interest of mountaineers, drawn to its natural isolation and rugged terrain.

== Climbing route ==
There are two main routes to the summit. From Valbona Valley, the ascent begins at the village of Ragam. The trail initially follows the path toward Qafa e Boshit but before reaching the pass, hikers turn right toward the summit. An alternative hike starts near Margjeka guesthouse, heading toward Grykat e Hapëta, where after two hours of hiking, the trail descends into the Briza Valley on the right-hand side. From there, it continues over Briza Peak and onward to the main summit.

The ascent requires approximately ten hours round trip, covering a distance of about 16 km and is considered demanding due to elevation gain and rugged alpine terrain.

== See also ==
- List of mountains in Albania
