= Rikard Ljarja =

Albanian actor

Rikard Ljarja AM
- Born: 1 April 1943; Shkodër, Albania
- Died: 20 April 2020 (aged 77); Tirana, Albania
- Occupations: Actor; screenwriter; director; writer
- Spouse: Marjeta Ljarja

Rikard Ljarja (Albanian pronunciation: [ɾiˈkaɾd ˈljaɾja]; 1 April 1943 – 20 April 2020) was an Albanian actor, screenwriter, director and writer. He starred in over 25 feature films and directed 11, and is most known for his role as Deda in Rrugë të bardha ("White Roads") (1974).

== Life and career ==
He was born in Shkodër on 1 April 1943, in Italian-occupied Albania. In 1960, he completed secondary education in Jordan Misja High School in his hometown. After completing his tertiary education at the "Aleksandër Moisiu" High School for Actors (now part of University of Arts, Tirana) in 1965, he became part of the "Migjeni" Theatre in Shkodër for the following 8 years. From 1973 to 1996 he worked full-time as an actor, screenwriter and director for the nationalized Kinostudio Shqipëria e Re (now National Center of Cinematography) and its successor Albafilm-Tirana (1992–1996). After retiring in 1996 he worked as artistic director in RTSH until 2002.

He also wrote books, publishing works such as A Godforsaken Place Around Here (2014), Josifopedia (2018), 9 të shkurtra (2019) (English: 9 Short Ones), Prill (2020) (English: April).

Ljarja died on 20 April 2020 after a long battle with cancer.

== Filmography ==
Year	Title	Role	Actor	director	screenWriter	Notes
1966	Komisari i dritës	Dritan Shkaba	Yes	No	No	
1967	Duel i heshtur	Skënderi	Yes	No	No	
1967	Ngadhënjim mbi vdekjen	Perlati	Yes	No	No	
1968	Plagë të vjetra	Naimi	Yes	No	No	
1971	Kur zbardhi një ditë	Komisari	Yes	No	No	
1972	Yjet e netëve të gjata	Xhandari	Yes	No	No	
1972	Ndërgjegjja	Kujtimi	Yes	No	No	
1974	Shpërthimi	Inxhinier Iliri	Yes	No	No	
1974	Shtigje të luftës	Rrema	Yes	No	No	
1974	Rrugë të bardha	Deda	Yes	No	No	
1975	Rrugicat që kërkonin diell	Gaqo Tipografi	Yes	Yes	No	
1975	Në fillim të verës	I deleguari i qarkut	Yes	No	No	
1976	Ilegalët	Tosti	Yes	Yes	No	
1977	Monumenti	Fasatar	Yes	No	No	
1978	Në pyjet me borë ka jetë	Luka	Yes	Yes	No	
1979	Radiostacioni	Komandanti	Yes	Yes	No	
1980	Skëterrë '43	Andrea	Yes	Yes	No	
1981	Dita e parë e emërimit		No	Yes	No	Short film
1983	Fundi i një gjakmarrjeje		No	Yes	No	
1984	Ura pranë kështjellës		No	Yes	Yes	Short film
1985	Pranverë e hidhur	Xha Teli	Yes	No	No	Short film
1985	Në prag të jetës	Andrea	Yes	No	No	
1986	Kur hapen dyert e jetës		No	Yes	Yes	
1987	Rrethi i kujtesës	Mjeku	Yes	No	No	
1988	Pesha e kohës	Vasili	Yes	Yes	Yes	
1990	Fletë të bardha	Shoku Emir	Yes	No	No	
1996	Viktimat e Tivarit		Yes	No	No	
2006	Anatema		Yes	No	No	
2009	Zumbotron!		Yes	No	No	Short film
