= Kumbaro =

Kumbaro is an Albanian surname. Notable people with the surname include:

- Mirela Kumbaro (born 1966), Albanian politician
- Saimir Kumbaro (born 1945), Albanian film director
