= Peçmara =

Summit in Albania

- Maja e Peçmarës
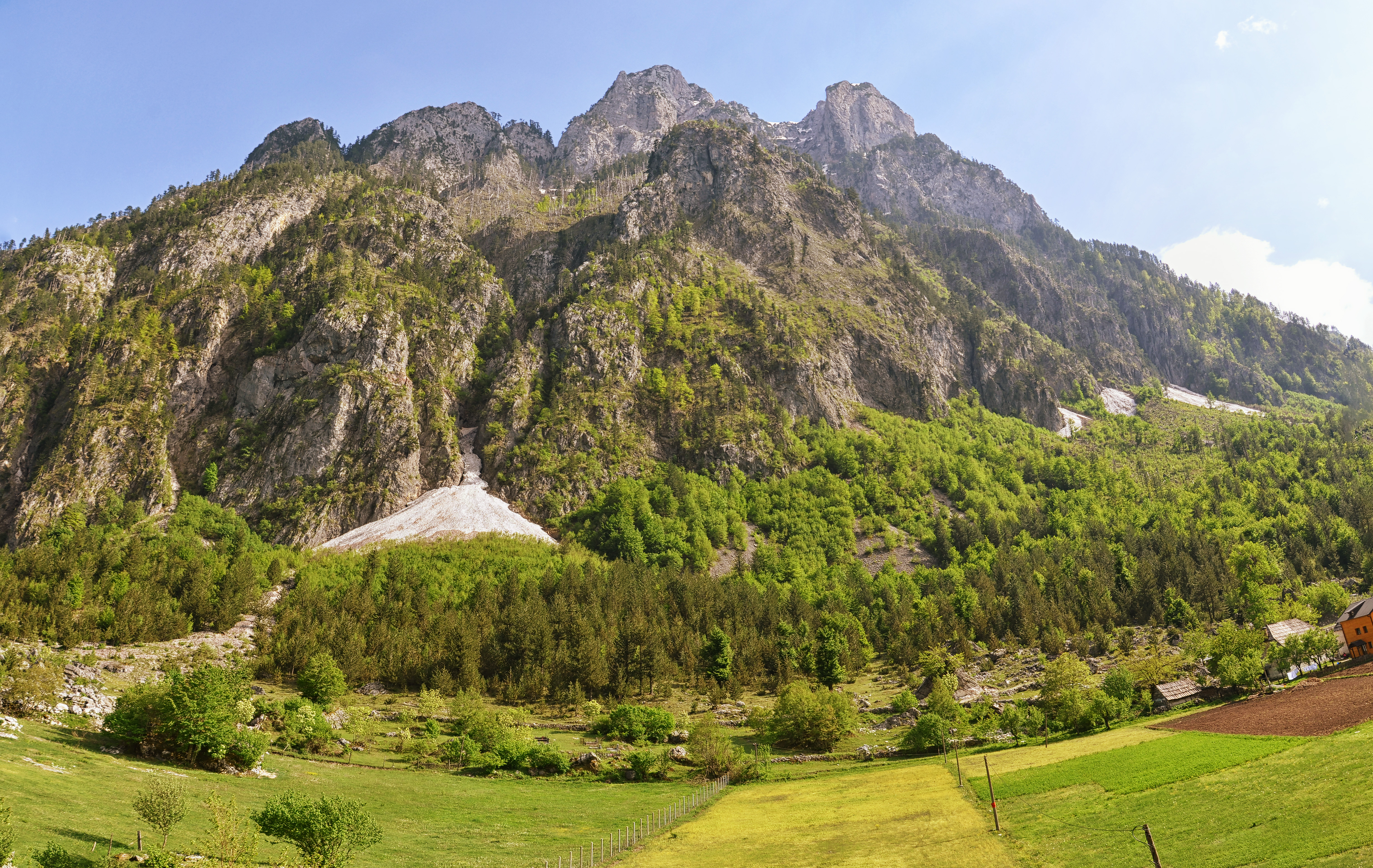
- View of Peçmara from the southern end of Valbona River

Highest point
- Elevation: 2,468 m (8,097 ft)
- Prominence: 337 m (1,106 ft)
- Isolation: 3 km (1.9 mi)
- Coordinates: 42°26′06″N 19°54′47″E

Geography
- Location within Albania
- Country: Albania
- Region: Albanian Alps
- Municipality: Tropojë
- Parent range: Accursed Mountains

Geology
- Mountain type: summit
- Rock type: limestone

Peçmara is a summit in northern Albania, rising to an elevation of 2,468 m (8,097 ft) above sea level. It is situated in the southeastern sector of Valbona Valley, in the Accursed Mountains range.

== Geography ==
The peak lies south of the settlement of Çukë-Dunishë and northeast of Qetat e Harushës. It forms part of the dramatic alpine landscape that characterizes the Valbona region, known for its steep limestone ridges, deep glacial valleys and sharp mountain saddles.

Maja e Peçmarës is positioned within the Valbona River basin, which drains westward into the Drin River system. The surrounding terrain includes a series of prominent summits and passes that define the southeastern section of the park.

== Climbing route ==
The most common route to the summit begins near Margjeka guesthouse. The trail ascends toward a mountain pass and continues through Lugu i Bolçit, a meadow that separates Qetat e Harushës to the west from the peaks of Ismet Sali Bruçaj and Dashlem to the east.

The round-trip hike is physically demanding and covers approximately 17 kilometers (11 mi), with an overall elevation gain of about 1,500 meters (4,920 ft). Reaching the summit typically requires around five hours, while the descent takes approximately four hours under normal conditions.

From there, hikers are rewarded with wide panoramic views over the Valbona Valley and the surrounding massifs of the Albanian Alps.

== See also ==
- List of mountains in Albania
