= Qetat e Harushës =

Summit in Albania

- Location within Albania

Highest point
- Elevation: 2,421 m (7,943 ft)
- Prominence: 120 m (390 ft)
- Isolation: 765 m (2,510 ft)
- Coordinates: 42°25′53″N 19°54′18″E

Naming
- English translation: Bear's ledges

Geography
- Country: Albania
- Region: Albanian Alps
- Municipality: Tropojë
- Parent range: Zhaborret

Geology
- Rock age: Triassic
- Mountain type: summit
- Rock type: limestone

Qetat e Harushës (lit. 'Bear's ledges') is a 2,421-meter-high summit located on the left side of Valbona Valley, within the northern reaches of the Albanian Alps.

== Geology ==
Positioned along the northeastern segment of the Zhaborret ridgeline, between Peçmara (2,468 m) and Maja e Kurorsës, its steep slopes are dissected by two glacial cirques of the same name, which define the rugged terrain.

The hiking trail to the summit presents no significant technical challenges; however, the northern face of the peak is sharply contoured, offering unobstructed views directly over the valley below.

== Biodiversity ==
Vegetation in the area is relatively abundant. The lower slopes, particularly up to elevations of 900–1,000 meters, are covered with broadleaf forests, dominated by downy oak (Quercus pubescens) and sweet chestnut (Castanea sativa).

== Climbing route ==
The most common route to the summit begins near Margjeka guesthouse, in Valbona Valley. The ascent typically requires approximately eight hours of hiking (round trip), covering a distance of about 15 kilometers with an elevation gain of roughly 1,400 meters.

The trail is considered physically demanding due to the significant altitude change and rugged alpine terrain. Nevertheless, it rewards hikers with expansive views of the central Albanian Alps.

== See also ==
- List of mountains in Albania
