= The Silent Duel =

The Silent Duel may refer to:

- The Quiet Duel, a 1949 Japanese film, also released as The Silent Duel
- The Silent Duel (1967 film), an Albanian psychological thriller film
