= Njësiti guerril =

- Directed by: Hysen Hakani
- Written by: Muharren Skënderi
- Starring: Saimir Kumbaro; Ndrek Luca
- Cinematography: Saim Kokona
- Music by: Agim Krajka
- Distributed by: Albafilm-Tirana
- Release date: November 27, 1969
- Running time: 83 minutes
- Country: Albania
- Language: Albanian

Njësiti guerril is a 1969 Albanian action war film drama directed by Hysen Hakani and written by Muharren Skënderi. The film starred Saimir Kumbaro and Ndrek Luca.

== Cast ==
- Pëllumb Dërvishi
- Drita Haxhiraj
- Saimir Kumbaro
- Petrit Llanaj
- Marie Logoreci
- Ndrek Luca

== Plot ==
Operation "Black Snake" World War II, Italian spy agency (SIM) through Ludovic tries to infiltrate the ranks of the city's guerrilla units. They aim to discover and destroy the leaders and all resistance. Agent Ludovik is discovered and thus the entire fascist plan fails.
