= Azem, ti je gjallë =

Azem, ti je gjallë (English: Azem, you are alive) is a 2008 documentary film about the Albanian political leader Azem Hajdari, directed by Saimir Kumbaro.

== Azem Hajdari ==
Azem Hajdari (March 11, 1963 - September 12, 1998), was the leader of the student's movement in 1990-1991 which overthrew communism in Albania and then an Albanian politician of the Democratic Party. He was assassinated in Tirana.
