= Mimika Luca =

Albanian actress (1937–2023)

- Luca in 1979
- Born: 24 December 1937; Gjirokastër, Albania
- Died: 21 February 2023 (aged 85); Tirana, Albania
- Occupation: Actress
- Years active: 1960–2023
- Spouse: Ndrek Luca (m. 1962; died 1993)
- Children: Gjergj Luca

Mimika Luca (24 December 1937 – 21 February 2023) was an Albanian actress. Her career in films and stage made her known as one of the earliest actresses in National Theater of Albania.

== Personal life ==
Luca was born on 24 December 1937 in Gjirokastër. She spent her childhood in an orphanage. She began her artistic career in 1951 with solo performances on the stage of the National Theatre of Opera and Ballet of Albania as a ballet dancer. In 1962, she joined the People's Theater (Alb. Teatri Popullor), where she performed as an actress. She played 30 roles on the national stage. From 1977, she taught students at the Drama Department of the University of Arts in Tirana.

Luca made her big screen debut in 1963 with a cameo role in the film Detyre e posaçme. After that, she starred in 14 feature films, seven of which were the main roles. She had starred in several dramas, the most frequently performed on Albanian stages being Drita (Light), completed in 1968.

Luca was married to fellow actor Ndrek Luca (1927–1993), with whom she had a son, Gjergj. She died in Tirana on 21 February 2023, at the age of 85.
