= Saimir Kumbaro =

Albanian film director (born 1945)

Saimir Kumbaro (born 5 May 1945) is an Albanian film director of the 1980s.

He worked in "Kinostudio Shqiperia e Re" as a director since 1970. He initially appeared as an actor in Njësiti guerril in 1969 but his first film was Rrugicat që kërkonin diell in 1975, a film that starred Ndrek Luca.In 1978 received the title as the best director for the movie "Concert on year 36" He has conducted over 90 documentary films where the "Lira" is declared winner of the festival in 2004. His two latter documentary are "Sherbastari i Kombit" and "Martyrs".

He retired from directing in 1995. In 2007 he resisted Azem, ti je gjallë.

== Filmography ==
- Ne dhe Lenini (2007)
- Të burgosurit e galerisë (1994)
- Vdekja e kalit (1992)
- Historiani dhe kameleoni (1989)
- Rrethimi i vogël (1986)
- Tre njerëz me guna (1985)
- Nxënsit e klasës sime (1984)
- Gracka (1983)
- Gjurmë në kaltërsi (1981)
- Gëzhoja e vjetër (1980)
- Koncert në vitin 1936 (1978)
- Ilegalët (1976)
- Rrugicat që kërkonin diell (1975)
- Azem, ti je gjallë (2007)
