= Rrugicat që kërkonin diell =

- Directed by: Saimir Kumbaro
- Written by: Dhimitër Xhuvani
- Starring: Ndrek Luca
- Cinematography: Ilia Terpini
- Music by: Kujtim Laro
- Distributed by: Albafilm-Tirana
- Release date: February 22, 1975
- Running time: 160 minutes
- Country: Albania
- Language: Albanian

Rrugicat që kërkonin diell is a 1975 Albanian action drama film directed by Saimir Kumbaro and written by Dhimitër Xhuvani.

== Cast ==
- Demir Hyskja
- Rikard Larja
- Ndrek Luca
- Pandi Raidhi
- Mevlan Shanaj
- Fitim Makashi
