= Mali i Hekurave =

Mountain in Albania

- Maja e Paqes
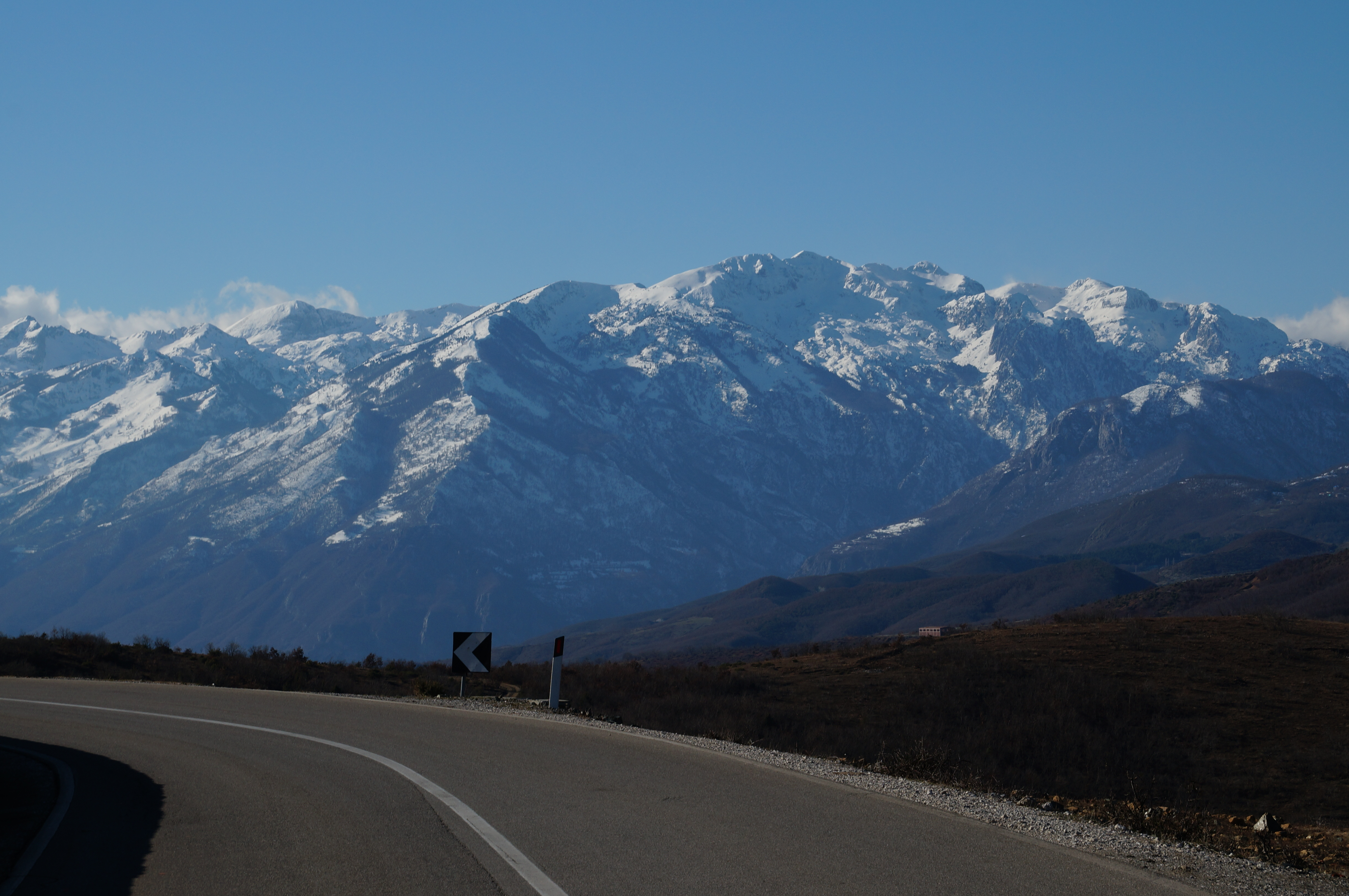
- View of the massif from a distance

Highest point
- Elevation: 2,560 m (8,400 ft)
- Prominence: 495 m (1,624 ft)
- Isolation: 5.9 km (3.7 mi)
- Coordinates: 42°23′02″N 19°58′06″E

Naming
- English translation: Iron Mountain

Geography
- Location within Albania
- Country: Albania
- Region: Albanian Alps
- Municipality: Tropojë
- Parent range: Accursed Mountains
- Borders on: Lugu i Thiut

Geology
- Rock age: Triassic
- Mountain type: massif
- Rock type(s): limestone, dolomite

Mali i Hekurave (lit. 'Iron Mountain') is a massif in the Accursed Mountains, within the limits of Tropojë municipality, in northern Albania. Its main peak, Maja e Hekurave, rises to a height of 2,560 m (8,400 ft).

== Geology ==
Mali i Hekurave is bounded by the central Valbona Valley to the northeast, the basin of Tropojë to the southeast and the basin of Nikaj-Mërtur to the southwest. The mountain is composed entirely of Triassic limestone and dolomite. Its sharp pyramidal shape is due to the numerous glacial cirques that stretch on almost all sides and descend step by step into the valley of Motinë from the northeast, into the trough of the Liqeni stream from the southeast and the Selbicë stream from the west.

Other peaks in the massif include Alshina (2,295), Maja e Zezë (2,424 m) and Maja e Dhive (2,332 m). The mountain mass is barren above 1,800 m, featuring only alpine pastures, while beech and cypress grow below this height.

== See also ==
- List of mountains in Albania
