= Ndrek Luca =

Albanian actor (1927–1993)

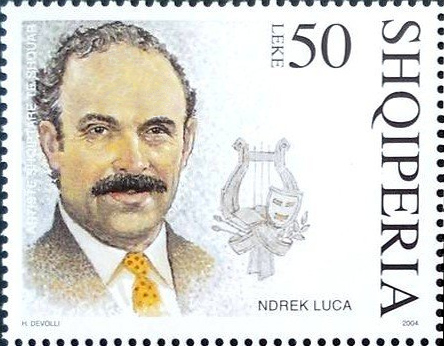
- Luca on a 2004 stamp of Albania
- Born: 3 September 1927; Dukagjin, Albania
- Died: 13 January 1993 (aged 65); Tirana, Albania
- Occupation: Actor
- Years active: 1950–1993
- Spouse: Mimika Luca (m. 1962; died 1993)
- Awards: People's Artist; Merited Artist

Ndrek Luca (3 September 1927 – 13 January 1993) was an Albanian actor, who became a popular icon through his starring roles in films which were produced during Kinostudio Shqipëria e Re, especially in leading roles of protagonists and antagonists in drama and war movies.

== Life and career ==
Luca was born in Dukagjin (today part of Mat) on 3 September 1927. He appeared in many films between 1963 and 1991. His family moved to Shkodër when he was young, where he finished school.

After the liberation of the country, Ndreka went to study at the Aviation Academy in Belgrade (Yugoslavia). Although he continued his military education, he had a great passion for theater and opera. He followed them constantly during his school years.

After graduating and returning to his homeland, his passion prompted him to ask the authorities of the time to become active with the Army Theater.

He achieved this thanks to the talent and support of the Russian director of the People's Theater, Zina Andri. In 1950, he began working as a professional actor at the People's Theater (today the National Theater).

His first performance at the Theater on November 11, 1950 was the role of Shpend Gjeto Plaku in the play "Halili dhe Hajria" by Kolë Jakova.

The following performances in the plays are still remembered by those who have seen him on stage: “Halili and Hajrija”, “Shtatë Shaljanët” (drama written by Ndreku), “Dragon of Dragobisë”, “Familia e peshkatarit”, “Votra e huej” (written by Ndreku), “Toka jonë, Arturo ui”, “Otello”, “Orët e Kremlinit” etc.

Ndreku wrote several plays that were played on stage and played over 30 characters in film.

Although a lot of time has passed, the roles are remembered not only by his generation but also by today's generation.

Among them, the following interpretations stand out: Dom Marku (“Commissioner of Light”), Ndrio (“Udha e shkronjave”), Gjini (“Plagë të vëreta”), Pjetër Mustaqekuqi (“Operation Fire”), Kapter Rahmiu (“Duel i hëstur”) etc.

Ndrek was married to actress Mimika Luca. They have a son, businessman Gjergj Luca. Ndrek died on 13 January 1993, at the age of 65 after a cardiac arrest.

== Filmography ==
- Viktimat e Tivarit (1996)
- Balada e Kurbinit (1990)
- Flaka e maleve
- Guri i besës (1986)
- Koha nuk pret (1984) (TV) .... Cen Vrapi (Ypsiloni)
- Lundrimi i parë (1984).... Qazimi
- Fundi i një gjakmarrjeje (1983).... Shpend Gollapi
- Qortimet e vjeshtës (1982) .... Rasim Aga
- Nusja (1980)
- Nga mesi i errësirës (1978) Xha Metja, përgjegjësi i Kaldajes
- Udha e shkronjave (1978) (TV) .... Ndrio
- Pylli i lirisë (1976) .... Zoti Lam Shllapi
- Thirrja (1976) .... Vat Marash Bregasi
- Tinguj lufte (1976) .... Selimi
- Në fillim të verës (1975) .... Gjeneral Piccioni
- Rrugicat që kërkonin diell (1975)..... Gani Herri
- Shpërthimi (1974)
- Shtigje të luftës (1974) .... Ramazan Daci, komandanti i Milicise
- Operacioni Zjarri (1973) .... Pjeter Mustakuqi
- Gjurma (1970) .... Babai i Artanit
- Njësiti guerril (1969) .... Shoku Çekan
- Prita (1968)
- Duel i Heshtur (1967) .... Kapter Rahmiu
- Oshëtime në bregdet (1966) .... Jonuz Bruga
- Komisari i Dritës (1966) .... Don Pali, Prifti
- Detyrë e posaçme (1963) .... Tomori
- ‘Ceta e voger’ …….. Dash Cungeli
- ‘Furtuna’. ……. Marinar
- ‘Mysafiri’. …… Drejtues i sigurimit
- ‘Plage te vjetra’. … Gjin Maneshi
- ‘Brazdat’. . Vellai Ademit
- ‘Vellezer dhe shoke’. ..Oficeri italian
