= Rudina Hajdari =

Albanian politician (born 1987)

Member of the Albanian Parliament
- Incumbent
- Assumed office 9 September 2017

Personal details
- Born: Rudina Azem Hajdari; 15 August 1987 (age 38) Tirana, Albania
- Party: Democratic Party of Albania (2017–2019); Independent (2019–2021); Nisma Thurje (2021–2024)

Rudina Azem Hajdari (born 15 August 1987) is an Albanian-American retired politician who served as a member of the Assembly of the Republic of Albania. Daughter of the late Azem Hajdari, who led the 1990–1991 student movement which brought about the collapse of communism in Albania, Hajdari was elected to Albania's assembly on 9 September 2017, representing an area of the country's capital city, Tirana.

== Early life and career ==
After her father's assassination in 1998, Hajdari moved to the United States to pursue her education. She attended Fordham University and graduated in 2009 with a bachelor's degree in political science, followed by a master's degree in geopolitics, Territory and Security at King's College London. Hajdari then pursued her second master's degree in Human Rights at Columbia University. Hajdari has subsequently addressed the University of Columbia's Harriman Institute for Russian, Eurasian and Eastern European Studies on the challenges which face the Western Balkans during the respective presidencies of Donald J. Trump and Vladimir V. Putin. Hajdari has also published numerous editorials on challenges for the region in outlets such as Newsweek Magazine.

Hajdari served as Staff Associate to Congressman Eliot L. Engel, a Ranking Member of the U.S. House of Representatives for the 16th District of New York, who also serves as Chairman of the United States House of Representatives Foreign Affairs Committee.

After her brief experience in the U.S. Congress, she decided to return to Albania, in a bid to help revive the party her father co-founded and restore its former glory.

== Political career ==
In June 2017, it was announced that she would be running for parliament, alongside the leader of the Democratic Party Basha in Tirana. Being in a secure position in the candidates list, it was seen as one of the prominent new figures brought by the democrats in parliament.

In September she was appointed as a member of the Committee on Foreign Policy and the Committee on European Integration. Living for many years abroad, she had difficulties through most of her public speeches during her parliamentary work.

In December 2018, following nationwide student protests in Albania, she violated her party decision of boycotting the Parliament to address the student's situation, declaring her support for the students and claiming that she was ready to leave her mandate and join the protests. In a public announcement she declared that Albania needs a new movement and that she considered leaving the Democratic Party, as it is not welcomed by people anymore.

Following former Democratic Party leader Lulzim Basha's 18 February 2019 decision to burn his mandate for office and give up his position as head of the Democratic Party in Parliament, Hajdari voiced strong disapproval of the party's decision to leave parliament en masse in a March 11 interview broadcast by Voice of America, in which Hajdari confirmed that she would not join the party's other 41 deputies in abandoning office. Hajdari has described her principal motivation as the increasingly violent protests which Lulzim Basha has led in Albania's capital, which have also received widespread international condemnation from High Representative of the European Union for Foreign Affairs and Security Policy Federica Mogherini and Commissioner for EU Enlargement Johannes Hahn.

Hajdari retired from politics in 2024 and lives in New York City.
