= Azem Hajdari =

Albanian politician (1963–1998)

Member of Albanian Parliament
- In office 1991–1998
- Deputy: Assembly of the Republic of Albania

Chairman of the Defense Parliamentary Commission
- Prime Minister: Aleksandër Meksi

Personal details
- Born: Azem Shpend Hajdari; March 11, 1963 Bajram Curri, Tropojë, Albania
- Died: September 12, 1998 (aged 35) Tirana, Albania
- Cause of death: Assassination
- Party: Democratic Party
- Domestic partner: Fatmira Hajdari
- Children: Kirjald Hajdari, Rudina and Azem Jr.
- Education: University of Tirana
- Profession: philosophy

Azem Shpend Hajdari (Albanian: [ˈazɛm hajˈdaɾi], March 11, 1963 – September 12, 1998) was the leader of the student movement in 1990–1991 that led to the fall of communism in Albania. He then became a politician of the Democratic Party of Albania (DP). He symbolizes the start of the democratic era in Albania. He was a member of the Albanian parliament and the Chairman of the Defence Parliamentary Commission. He was assassinated in Tirana on September 12, 1998 at age 35.

== Early life ==
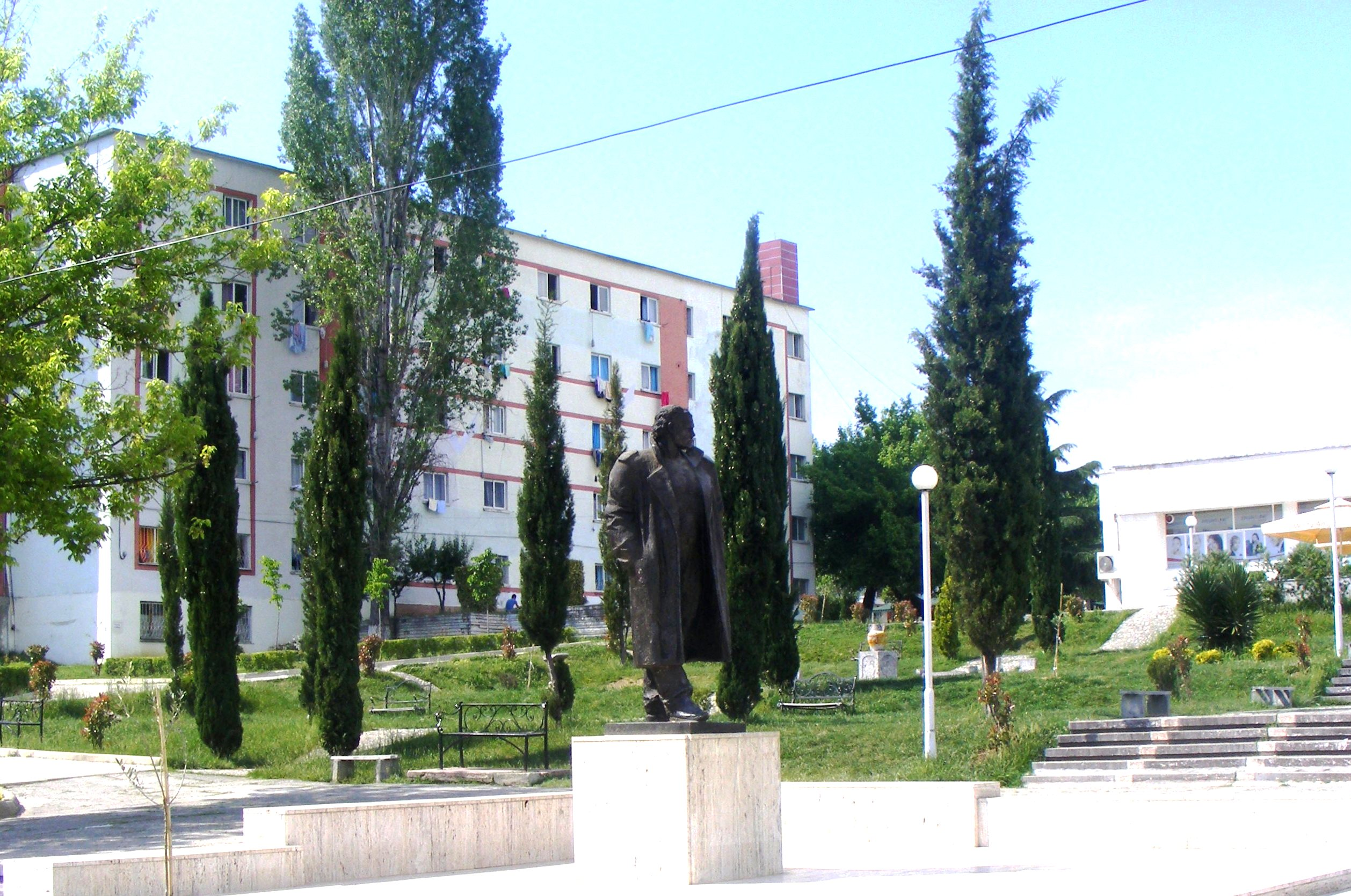
Monument dedicated to Azem Hajdari in Tirana

Hajdari came from a working family. He finished elementary school and high school in Bajram Curri. Hajdari studied philosophy at the University of Tirana, and was married to Fatmira Hajdari, with whom he had three children: Kirardi, Rudina, and Azem Junior (who was born four months after Hajdari's assassination). He was one of the main leaders of student demonstrations that brought the collapse of the Party of Labour of Albania in December 1990. He was also, briefly, the first leader of the Democratic Party of Albania (DP). He remained in that position until he was replaced in early 1991 by Sali Berisha, who later became Prime Minister of Albania. Hajdari was a close associate of Berisha, and came from the same district of Tropojë.

== Education ==
In 1993 Hajdari graduated on Philosophy Branch at the University of Tirana. In 1995 he graduated Jurisprudence again at the University of Tirana. On 1993 until 1994: Studied English language and philosophy in the United States and at 1996 he studied defense and security policy in Garmisch-Partenkirchen in Germany. Political activities in his youth included serving as a leader of the students' movement which overthrew communism in Albania. From December 1990 to February 1991, he was Chairman of the Leading Commission of the Democratic Party (the first opposition party after 50 years of totalitarian regime). From February 1991 to September 1993 he was Deputy-Chairman of the Democratic Party and a member of its steering committee.

== Public service ==
In the four free elections after the collapse of communism, Hajdari was elected a Member of Parliament.

- March 31, 1991 MP of Shkodër
- March 22, 1992 MP of Shijak
- May 26, 1996 MP of Bulqizë
- June 29, 1997 MP of Tropojë

Hajdari served as Chairman of the Parliamentary Commission on the Public Order and the National Intelligence Service from 1992–1996. In 1996 he was the Chairman of the Parliamentary Commission on the Public Order and the National Intelligence Service, and is November 1996 became President of the United Independent Albanian Trade Unions. In June 1997 he became the Chairman of the Parliamentary Commission of Defense.

From 1995 to 1998, Hajdari was the President of the KS Vllaznia Shkodër, the first sport club in Albania. He also served as the President of the Albanian Federation of Martial arts.

== Assassination attempts ==
Hajdari began receiving death threats from the beginning of his involvement in the student protests. On March 22, 1991, he received a package containing a severed rooster head and a letter written in blood: "Azem Hajdari, you are sentenced to death."

=== Tropojë attack ===
On June 4, 1998, at about 22:30, Hajdari and other members of the DP (including Jozefina Topalli and Vili Minarolli) were ambushed by gunmen. Bardhyl Pollo, former General Director of Albanian Radio and TV, was seriously wounded.

=== Parliament shooting ===
On September 18, 1997, Hajdari fought with Gafur Mazreku, a Member of Parliament of the Prime Minister Fatos Nano's governing Socialist Party, in a dispute over a proposed increase in the added value tax. Mazreku shot Hajdari five times with a pistol and ran from the hall. Hajdari was taken to a military hospital in grave condition. Mazreku ran to the nearby Albanian telegraph agency building, where he surrendered to police.

Mazreku was sentenced to eight years imprisonment by parliament.

On December 17, the court located in Tirana sentenced Mazreku to eleven years in prison for attempted murder. The prosecutor had demanded a 16-year sentence. Mazreku argued that he fired the shots in an act of revenge after Hajdari verbally assaulted and punched him. Hajdari, however, claimed the attack was politically motivated.

== Death ==
On September 12, 1998, Hajdari was shot and killed as he stepped out of the Democratic Party's office in Tirana with his two bodyguards, Besim Çera, who was killed, and Zenel Neza, who was seriously injured but survived. The three men were shot by Fatmir Haklaj who had been waiting in a car parked nearby. Hajdari was taken to the hospital by Besnik Docaj, a fellow Democrat. Cangu was seriously injured, and later died in hospital.

Hajdari died of severe shock from trauma and hemorrhaging due to numerous wounds to the chest and stomach. He was posthumously awarded a Martyr of Democracy award. Neza asked for asylum in the United States.

=== Reactions ===
The murder triggered two days of violent protests. During Hajdari's funeral procession on September 14, 1998, armed DP supporters ransacked government offices, and for a brief period, held the PM's office, the parliament building, and the Albanian State television and radio building. Estimates of casualties during the protests and riots ranged between 3 and 7 deaths and 14 and 76 injuries. After 72 hours, the government restored order and reclaimed tanks and armored personnel carriers seized by DP supporters. Parliament subsequently lifted Berisha's immunity due to his alleged role in what the government described as a coup d'état, but no charges were laid. Berisha blamed the Socialist Party of Albania and its leaders for the murder. Twelve people were arrested for their alleged involvement in the violence. In February 2002, five people, including Jaho Mulosmani, were sentenced for the murder by a Tirana district court.

== Legacy ==
A monument honoring Hajdari and his bodyguard Besim Çera was placed on the crime scene where both were killed (41°19′38″N 19°49′19″E).

The entrance road towards Valbona Valley National Park in northern Albania bears his name.

== Awards ==
On October 2, 1998, Hajdari was posthumously awarded honorary citizenship of Tirana, and in 2007 he was decorated with the Skanderbeg's Order by president Bamir Topi.

== See also ==
- Azem, ti je gjallë
- History of Albania
- Politics of Albania
