= The Silent Duel (1967 film) =

The Silent Duel (Duel i heshtur)
- Directed by: Dhimitër Anagnosti
- Written by: Nasho Jorgaqi
- Starring: Rikard Ljarja; Ndrek Luca
- Cinematography: Petraq Lubonja
- Music by: Nikolla Zoraqi
- Distributed by: Albafilm-Tirana
- Release date: August 17, 1967
- Running time: 82 minutes
- Country: Albania
- Language: Albanian

The Silent Duel (in Albanian Duel i heshtur) is a 1967 Albanian thriller film directed by Dhimitër Anagnosti and inspired by the 1947 event of Spiro Kote, who killed three men trying to escape Communist Albania.

== Plot ==
Three sailors try to escape to Italy via the Port of Durrës, and they take along the guard of the boat, which kills all three of them before reaching the Italian coast.

== Cast ==
- Rikard Ljarja
- Ndrek Luca - Kapterr Rramiu
- Reshat Arbana - Islami
- Bujar Kapexhiu - Bepin Dobrusha
