= Valbona Valley =

National park in Albania

- IUCN category II (national park)
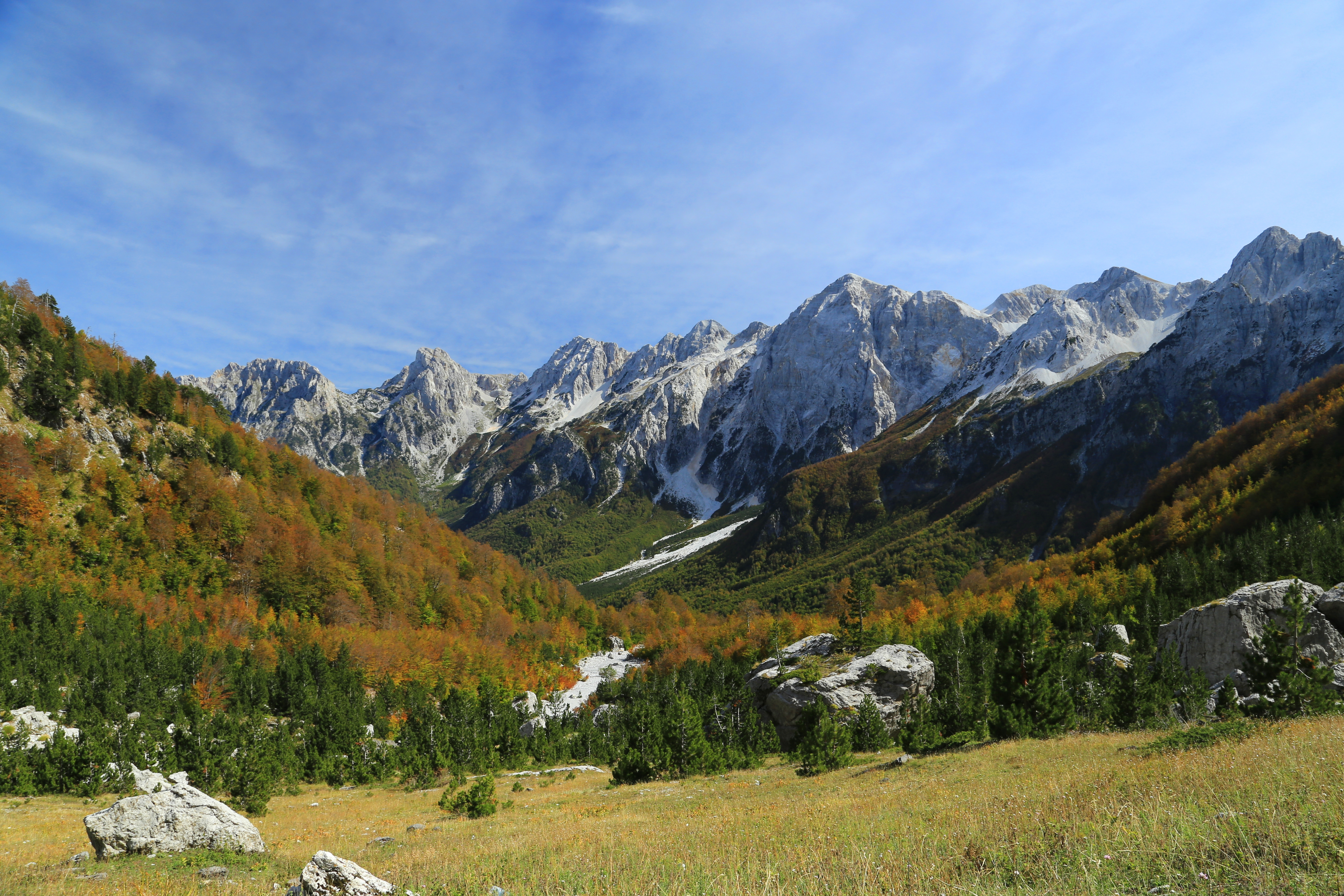
- The valley during the autumn season.

- Location within Albania Location within Europe
- Interactive map of Valbona Valley
- Location: Kukës County
- Nearest city: Bajram Curri
- Coordinates: 42°27′12″N 19°53′16″E
- Area: 8,000 ha (80 km^{2})
- Established: 15 January 1996
- Governing body: National Agency of Protected Areas

The Valbona Valley (Albanian: Lugina e Valbonës) is in the Albanian Alps in northern Albania. It is part of Alps of Albania National Park, one of the most impressive and notable topographic features of Albania. Being the southernmost continuation of the Dinaric Alps, it forms a section of the Alpine-Himalayan orogenic belt, which extend from the Atlantic Ocean to the Himalaya Mountains. The mountains are characterized by limestone and dolomite rocks and shows major karst features. Maja Jezercë sprawls to the west of the valley and is the highest mountain of the Dinaric Alps, with an altitude of 2,694 m (8,839 ft). The Valbona River originate from several karst springs along the south of Maja Jezercë and the east of Valbona Pass. It is the largest river within the Albanian Alps and drains the entire eastern portion of the range. Over the past few million years, glaciers have at times covered most of the park. During the Würm period, the glacier of Valbona reached a total length of 9.5 kilometres. Nowadays, there are two very small active glaciers close to the northeastern edge of Maja Jezercë.

The Valbona Valley and its surrounding mountains were protected as Valbona Valley National Park in 1996. In 2022, the park was amalgamated with Theth National Park to form Alps of Albania National Park. The park covered an area of 80 km^{2} (31 sq mi), encompassing Valbona River and its surrounding areas with mountainous terrain, alpine landscapes, glacial springs, deep depressions, various rock formations, waterfalls and the Valbona Valley with its dense coniferous and deciduous forest. It is characterized by its very remote areas which have a large preserved ecosystem all of which is primarily untouched with pristine quality.

The park's remoteness and relatively small human population, combined with the great variation of ecosystems and climatic conditions favours the existence of a rich variety of flora and fauna distributed throughout the land area. Most of the park consists of forest, covering 89% of the overall surface area. Brown bear, grey wolf, lynx, roe deer, chamois and wild goat are the primary predatory and browsing animals in the park. The park's forests are characterized by the predominance of different tree species, with beech, pine and oak. Notably, the most important tree species used to be Norway spruce; it is one of few regions in Albania where this species can be found.

Valbona Valley National Park was established in accordance with Decision of Council of Ministers number 102, dated 15 January 1996 in order to preserve the natural ecosystems and landscapes along with their vegetation and biodiversity communities and habitats.

Located within the park, the Gashi River is included into the UNESCO Primeval Beech Forests of the Carpathians and Other Regions of Europe. It is also part of the European Green Belt, which serves as a retreat for endangered and endemic species. The park applied also to join the EUROPARC Federation. Plantlife has recognised the park, as well as the Albanian Alps, as an Important Plant Area of international importance, because it supports great plant species. The region is part of the Emerald Network, the ecological network made up of Areas of Special Conservation Interest designated under the Bern Convention.

== Environment ==
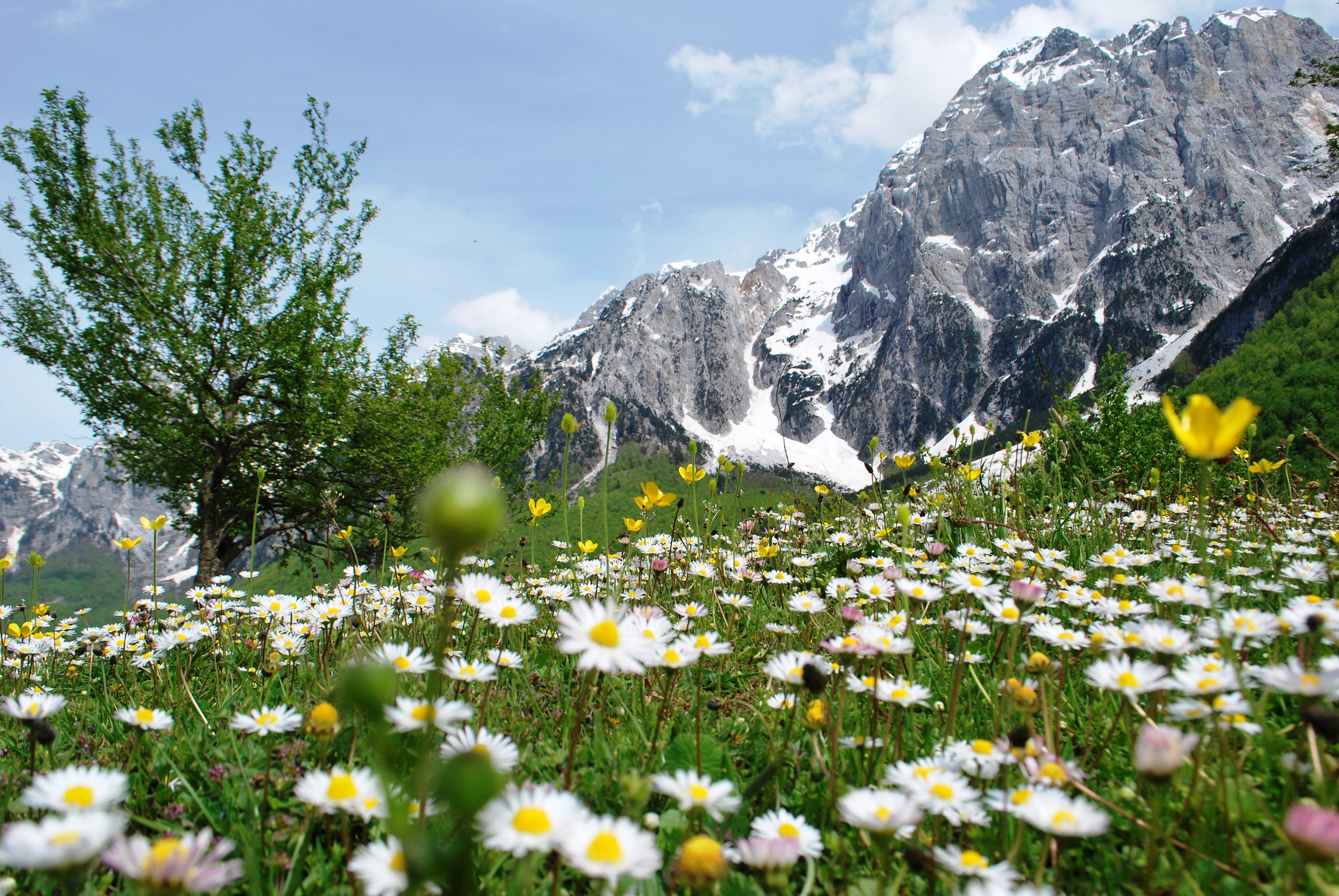
The snowy peaks as seen from the valley during spring.

Valbonë Valley National Park encompassed some of the Albanian Alps, the southernmost continuation of the Dinaric Alps. It is situated entirely in Kukës County and lies mostly between latitudes 42° and 27° N and longitudes 19° and 53° E. The u-shaped valley of Valbona extends between Maja Jezercë, Maja e Kollatës, Maja Boshit and Maja e Hekurave. From the bridge of Shoshani until Fierzë, the valley passes through the Tropojë catchment and the hilly relief between Bujani and Tëplani. The park bordered the Prokletije National Park to the north, Gashi Nature Reserve to the east, Nikaj-Mërtur Regional Nature Park to the south and Theth National Park to the west.

Located within the Albanian Alps, the park's climate is characterized by cold winters and hot, dry summers, although at higher altitudes it is pleasantly fresh even in summer. Due to the close proximity to the Mediterranean Sea located in the west, the climate is also exposed to the influences of the Mediterranean climate as well as the Continental climate.

The coldest periods are from December to February, while the hottest from July to August. The park's minimal temperature ranges between −23.4 °C (−10.1 °F) — −16.1 °C (3.0 °F) in winter and its maximal temperature between 36.4 °C (97.5 °F) — 39.9 °C (103.8 °F) in summer. The average altitude of annual precipitation ranges between 2,700 millimetres (110 inches) and 3,000 millimetres (120 inches), with the higher levels occurring at high altitudes. At least 22% falls during spring, 8.7% in summer, 32.3% in autumn and 38% during winter. At higher altitudes, snowfall begins in October or November and accumulates through to March or April when the melt begins. Snow reaches a height of 1.5–5 m and lasts between 60 and 160 days.

=== Geology ===
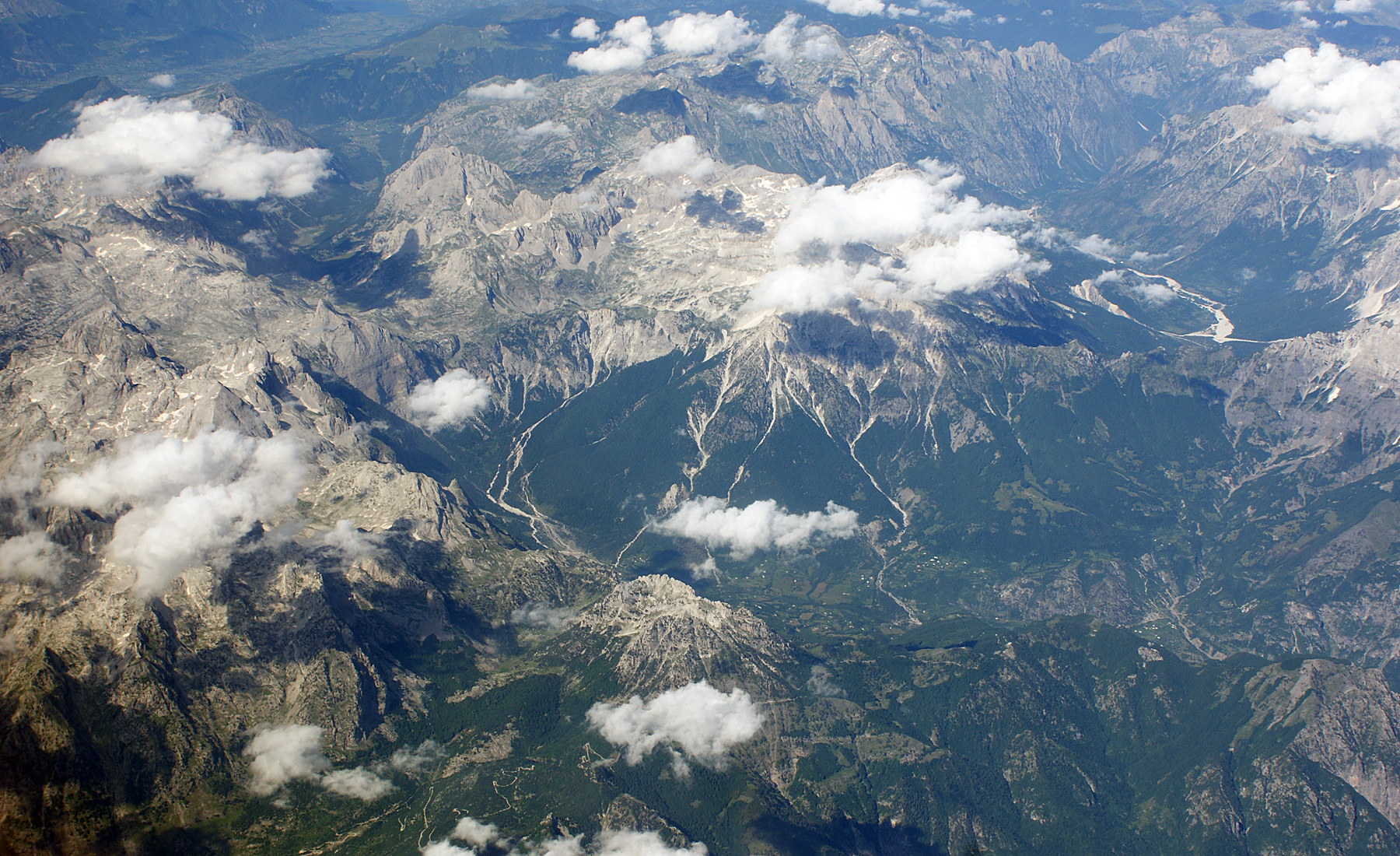
The Albanian Alps as seen from the air; the Valley of Valbonë lies in the upper part on the right with Maja Roshit and Maja e Kollatës to the left.

The relief of the park is mountainous and highly fragmented, characterized with steep slopes, high ridges and deep river valleys. The slopes of the mountains are almost vertical, with perpendicular rocks hanging on the river, peaks in the shape of towers dressed by trees, with their cirques filled with eternal snow altitude differences with the river bed. The Albanian Alps are a notable geographic feature of Southern and Southeastern Europe, being at the same time the highest section of the Dinaric Alps. The formation was an episodic process caused by the collision of the African and Eurasian plate. They are strongly karstified, where rain and snow quickly seep into a karst system. Nowhere in the Balkans have glaciers left so much evidence of erosion. In contrast to the Alps in Central Europe, the Albanian Alps are the most glaciated mountains in Europe located south of the Scandinavian ice sheet.

Geological formations are composed of limestone rocks, limestone - siliceous, clay shale and conglomerate. Gray forest soils are located on limestone rocks. Agricultural lands are brown forest soils and soils meadow mountain. There are grey forest soils between 500 and 1200 meters heights, then come Velvet Lands extending the left slope of this valley from Mbaskollata to Shoshan at height 400–900 meters. Their geological construction (alps) is diverse, with the oldest formations, those paleozoic ones, with which are related quartz mineral properties in river valley. Limestones that come from mesozoic, are wider spread, and serve as the basis of bauxite. They form the alps main ribs. Mixed with dolomite and modeled by karsts they form to Alpines a very bitter relief. Insoluble flysch deposits have formed a very harsh terrain. In the region, the carbonatite rocks are dominant and only in the villages of Valbona and Dragobia the schist nucleus of the Alps appear.

=== Hydrology ===
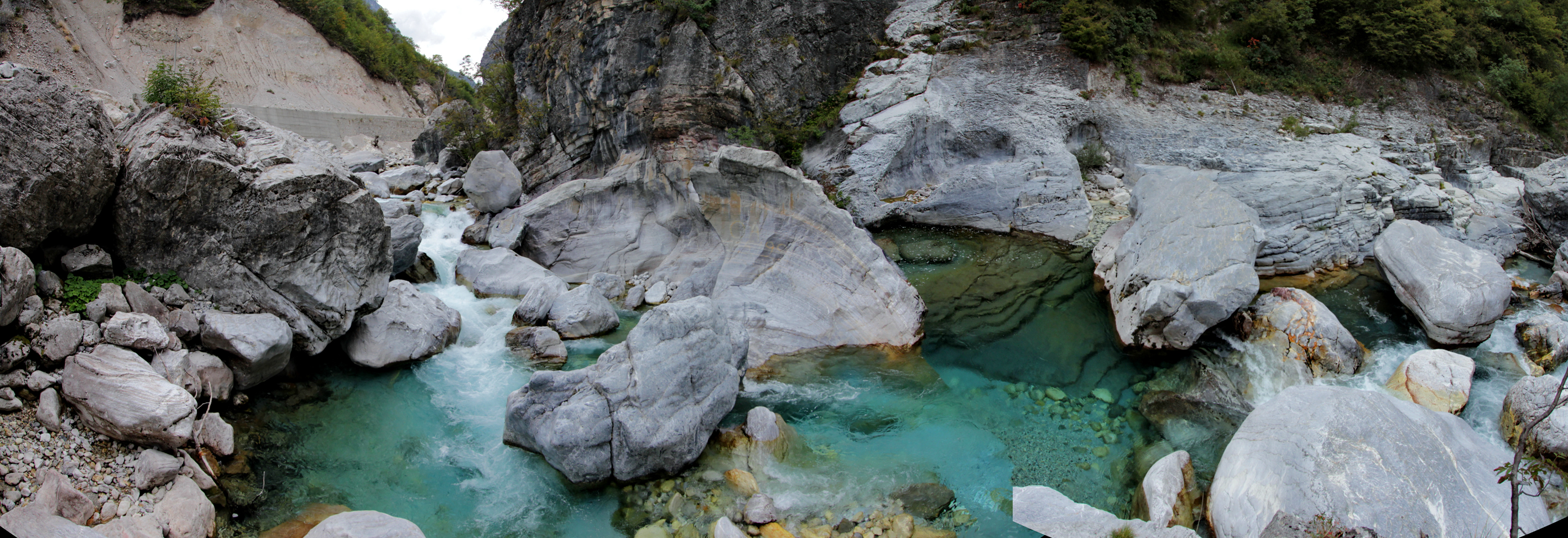
Panoramic view of the Valbona River.

The region is characterized by a highly developed hydrographic network represented by the water basins of the lake of Shkodër and of that of the rivers of Drin, Buna, Shala and Valbona. The park is situated along the course of the Valbona, the longest river on the Albanian Alps at 50.6 km (31.4 mi). The river begins at the southern slopes of Maja Jezercë on the eastern section of Valbona Pass and flows until it reaches the village of Valbona. At the end, the river, which until then was continuing through a narrow u-shaped valley, becomes the Fierza that is mostly surrounded by high mountains.

It flows away through the village and continues flowing towards Dragobia. Valbona River is a tributary of Drini River, which drains into Adriatic sea. Deduction from the peaks of the mountains of Rragami and Ceremi, is impulsive, full sound of effervescence for its terrain topography. At Shoshan's canyon, Valbona's river narrows sharply and creates the image of the rocks being cut as with a knife. Water is clean, bright and highly transparent up to 1 m depth. Frequent rain precipitations make this river unnavigable.

The Xhemas Lake is a natural basis, which is supplied by the water that steams inside this base from the depth of rocks and reaches up to 3 m depth in winter. It has an area about 500m^{2}. Lake has an altitude of 770 m above sea level. There is the main road close to it that goes from Dragobia to Valbona, exactly in "Quku i Dunishes", in the left of pedestrian road which arrives in the forest. Xhema lake has very cold clear water, rugged limestone cliffs and is surrounded by beech trees.

Shortly after the source of Valbona's river, colliding with rocks, is created a 50 metres high waterfall, which disappears at Rrogami gritty earth for about 5 km and then stems again at Valbona village.

The Shoshani Source is one of the biggest water sources of the Balkan Peninsula. It is located at the entry of Valbonë Valley and is continually visited by alpine nature lovers. The source provides potable water for the entire Tropoja District and its water quantity is equal to the half one of Valbona river.

=== Biology ===
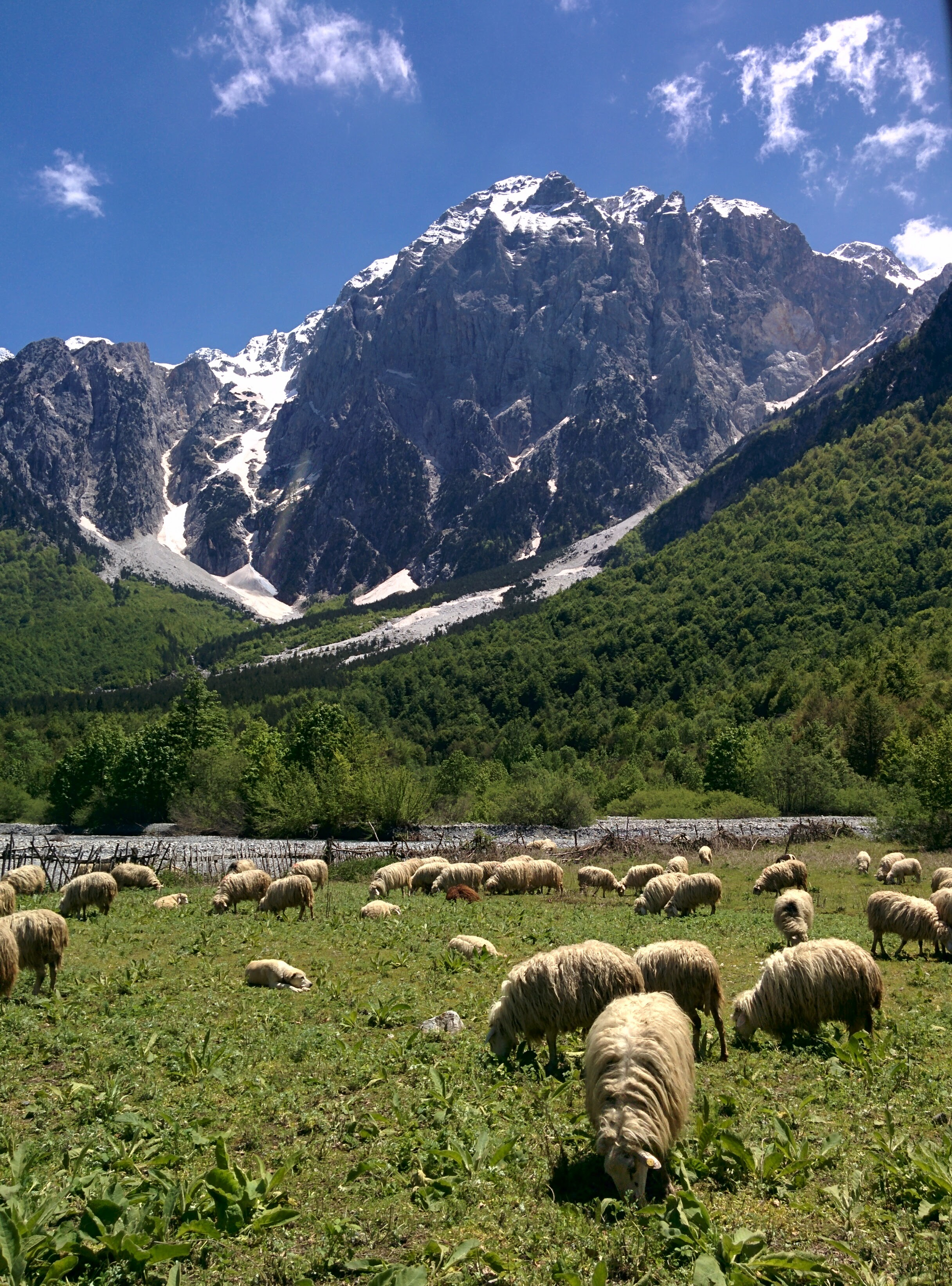
Typical habitat in Valbona Valley.

Even though the park is small in surface, on its area thrive hundreds of threatened and endemic animal and plant species. The levels of vegetation in the Albanian Alps meet the alpine level, from upland valleys through the montane mountain stage on forest-free alpine and subalpine mats and subnivale tundra caused by permafrost in vast heaps of rubble with raw soils.

In view of phytogeography, the park falls within the Dinaric Mountains mixed forests terrestrial ecoregion of the Palearctic temperate broadleaf and mixed forest. The forests of the park are covered by a mixture of deciduous and coniferous trees growing on limestone and dolomite, which is characteristic to the Albanian Alps. The most typical feature of the park's landscape is represented by its forests being a major resource in terms of their ecological functions, as well as in terms of the beauty they lend to the landscape.

The pine is one of the most common species of tree in the park. The area, which is dotted with pine, is mainly overgrown with austrian, balkan, bosnian and scots pine. The area around the village of Valbona is characterized by the predominance of different beech species such as European beech. The park is, however, considered to be the only area in the country, where a high number of forest formations with norway spruce can be found. A lush mixed forest occurs in the upper part of the valley represented with a mixture of silver fir, common beech, norway spruce and scots pine.

The banks of Valbona River are covered mainly with forests of grey alder, olive willow and goat willow. Besides, the park contains boglands, which are situated in the wet low lying environments whereas various species of narthecium, carex and sphagnum can be found. The steep slopes and ravines of the Valbona Valley are home to communities of largeleaf linden, sycamore, ash and wych elm, which grow mostly in cool and humid locations.

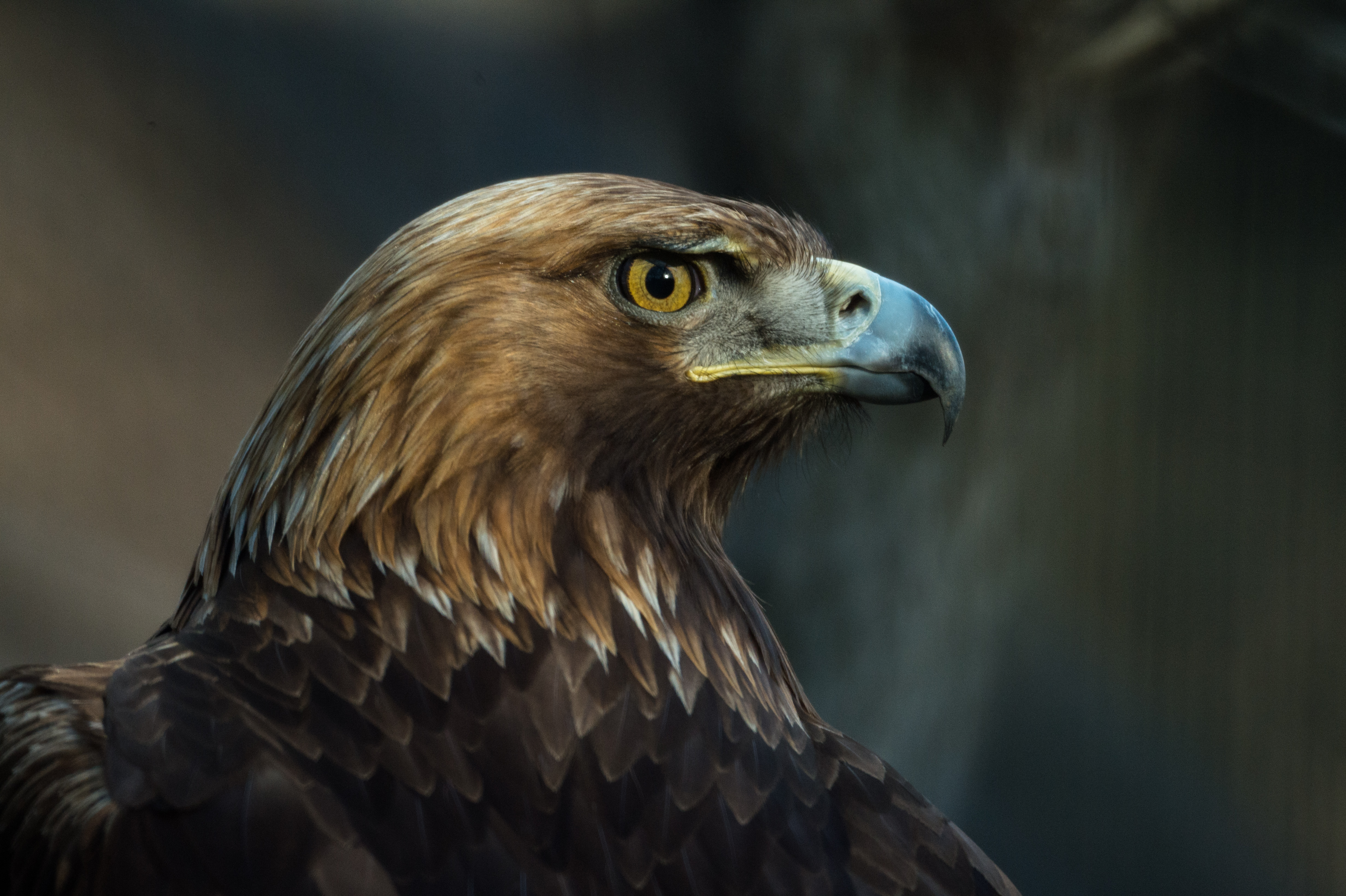
The park protect important bird species such as the golden eagle.

Due to the temperature and climate differences between different areas and elevations, the park is characterized by exceptionally rich and varied fauna. The park represents one of the most important national bio centers of wild fauna in the country. The wider land area is one of the last areas in Europe, in which a great number of brown bears and grey wolves can be found. The park is potentially a habitat for the critically endangered Balkan lynx. One of the park's special attractions is the existence of the rare chamois, which can be found at higher altitudes far from human activity. Most important wildlife inhabiting the Valbona Valley include roe deer and wild boar. We can also witness the presence of western western capercaillie and golden eagle.

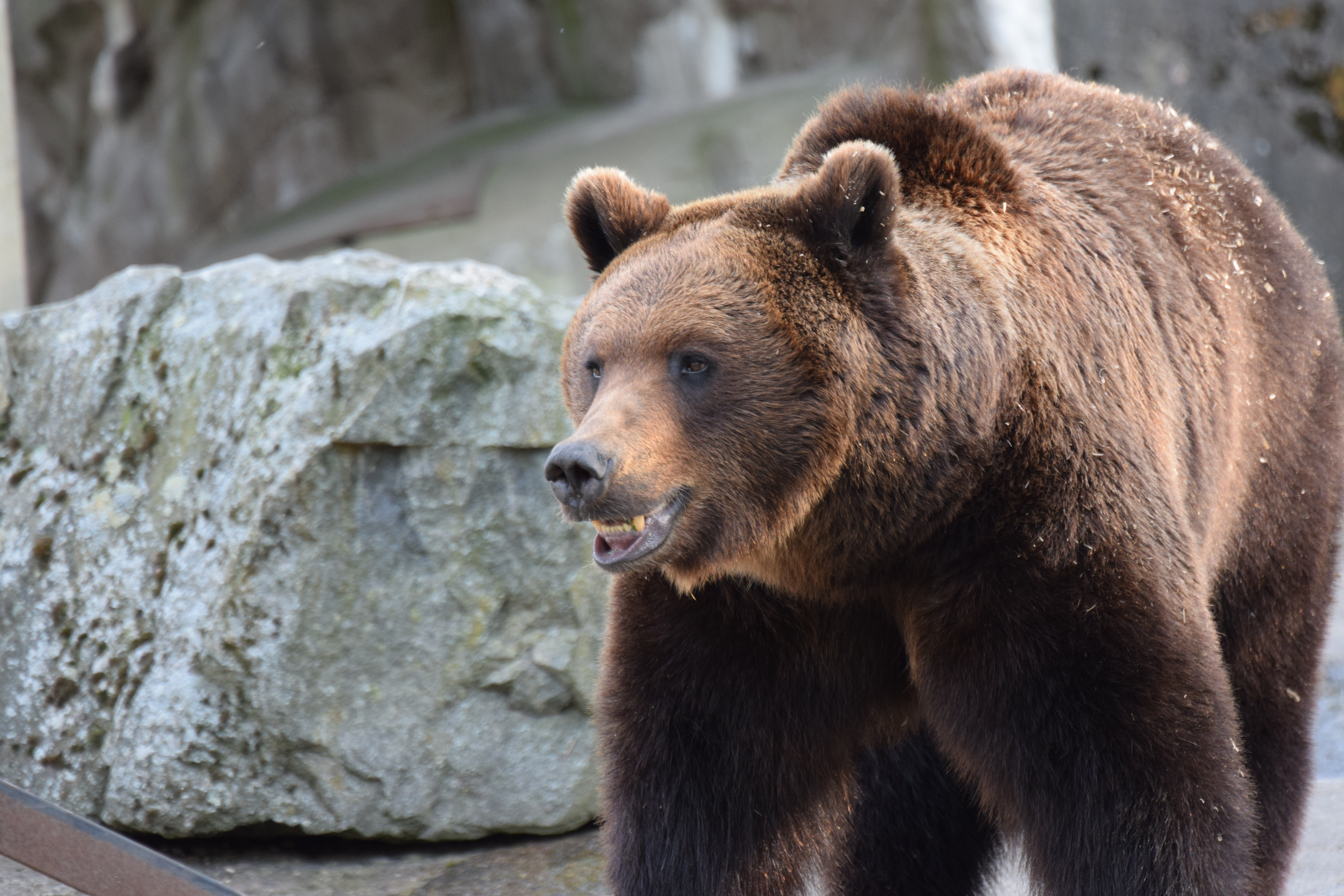
The endangered brown bear still survive within the boundaries of the park.

Sources of water, becks and glacial lakes are the basis of life for water insects, amphibians, and salmons. Species of fish are represented with species such as the marble trout and river trout. The limited number of species is determined by the predominant bodies of water including glacial lakes, streams and upper river courses, which are inhabited by fish species.

Due to its strategic position and the mosaic distribution of various types of habitats, the park is quite rich of bird genera. The total number of bird species is 145. Important birds of prey with high conservation value include the golden eagle, booted eagle, egyptian vulture, sparrowhawk, goshawk, lanner falcon, saker falcon, peregrine falcon and honey buzzard. The park hosts seven species and populations owls, such as the barn owl, scops owl, eagle owl, little owl, tawny owl, long-eared owl and short-eared owl. Other families of birds inhabiting the park include the alpine swift, alpine accentor, great cormorant, grey heron, rock partridge, common ringed plover, stock dove, common cuckoo and eurasian golden oriole.

== Demography ==
Valbona Valley has been inhabited since classical times what argues for the proper conditions that valley provides. The villages where the population is concentrated are: Rrogam, Valbona, Dragobi and Çerem which are located at the valley extensions. After 90' the situation began to change. As a result of not favorable economic conditions, the majority of the population moved out. Valley is inhabited by Krasniqi and Gashi tribes. A part of the population that has left the village is settled at lower villages of Margegaj municipality. Despite the recent changes that have been made in the demographic structure, the population still differs for its vitality. This affects at their ability to be active in the sector of tourism. During 1995–2002, villages like Çerem and Rragam have had a population decrease respectively of 63% and 57%.In 2008 the population at these villages was 920 persons but now it is 817. Villages are at risk of turning into seasonal ones.

It is a transboundary park in Albania and Montenegro, with the highest biodiversity value of the country's mountain mainlands.

Four villages are located within the park (Dragobi, Valbonë, Cerem and Rragam) with 852 inhabitants. All of these factors create more favorable conditions for coexistence and socioeconomical development, including Valbona National Park. Clean air, high and characteristic mountain peaks, lakes, numerous water resources, forests, mountains, flora and fauna provide conditions for profitable eco tourism.

Village	Demography	Male	Female	% of females	Number of families	Family members average
Dragobi	370	192	179	48%	112	3.3
Çerem	208	110	98	47%	67	3.1
Valbone	299	127	112	47%	69	3.46
Rragami	103	46	57	55%	22	4.68
Total	817	474	446	49.25%	270	3.63

=== Traditions ===
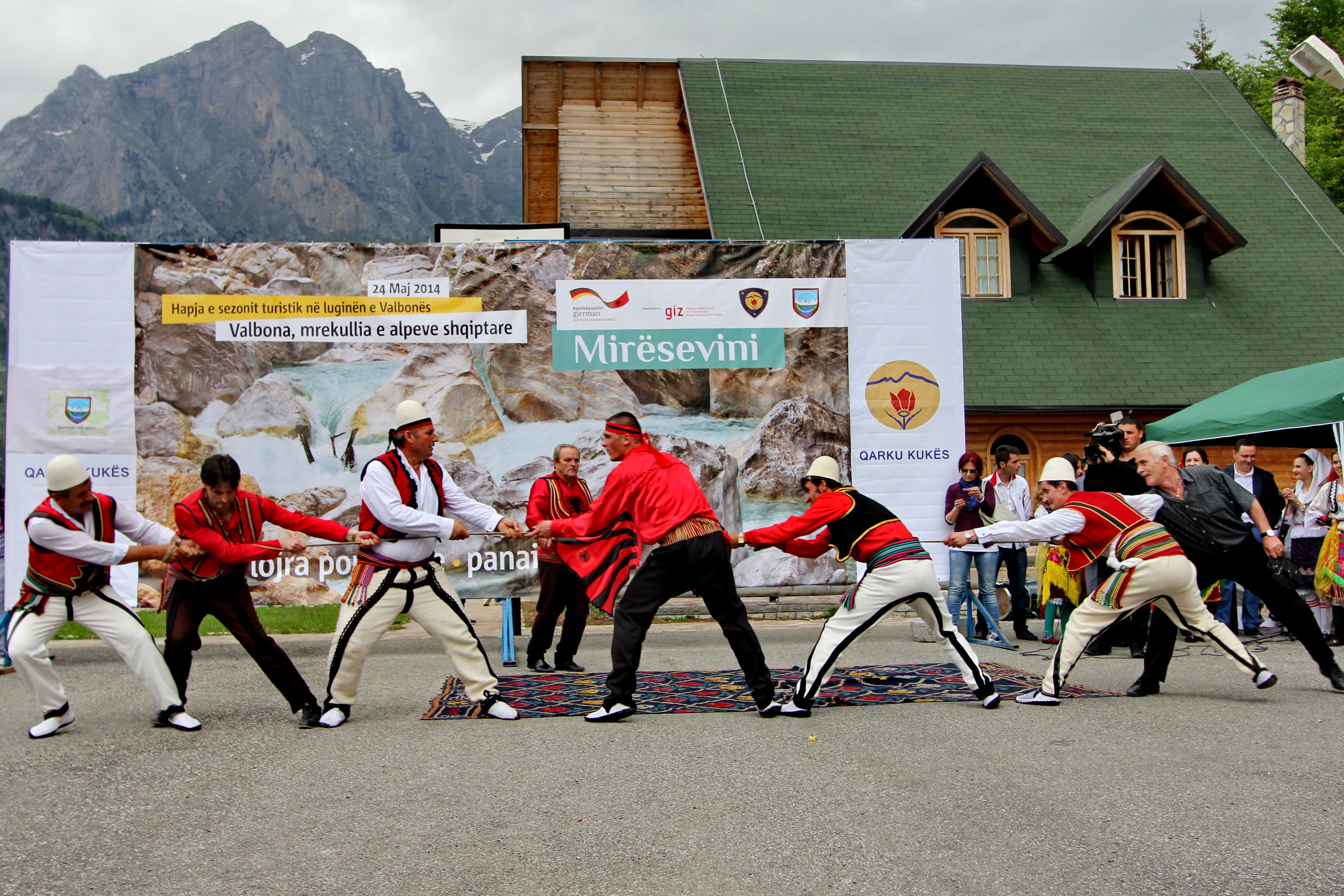
Popular Games in Valbona

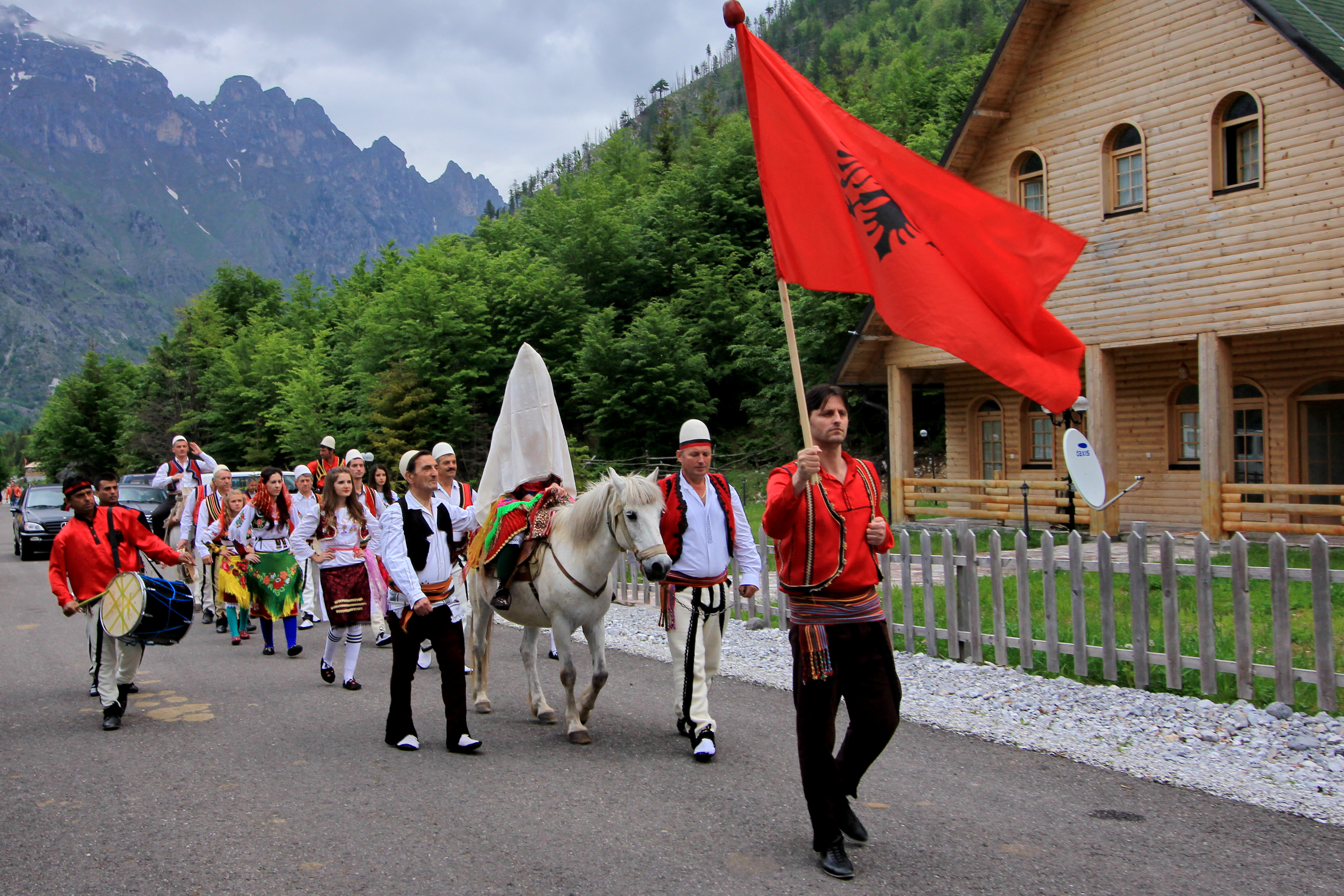
Traditional wedding in Valbona

In family and social life there are preserved folk festivals with various forms of entertainment. Spiritual wealth is manifested in verbal and musical folklore, especially in the legendary epic.

Among the traditional festivals of the area are Saint George (Shën Gjergji), which is celebrated at 6 May as "The summer's day", "Saint Nikol" (Shënkolli) a religious holiday celebrated at 5 December and 26 December or Dukagjini's. Popular folk dances of the area are 'Men's Dance', 'Dance of the Bride', 'The Sword Dance' and 'Dance of Flowers'. Legendary songs associated with two-stringed lute, flute, zumara (double clarinet), leaf sheet with the toy are also among the values which need to be treasured.

== Economy ==
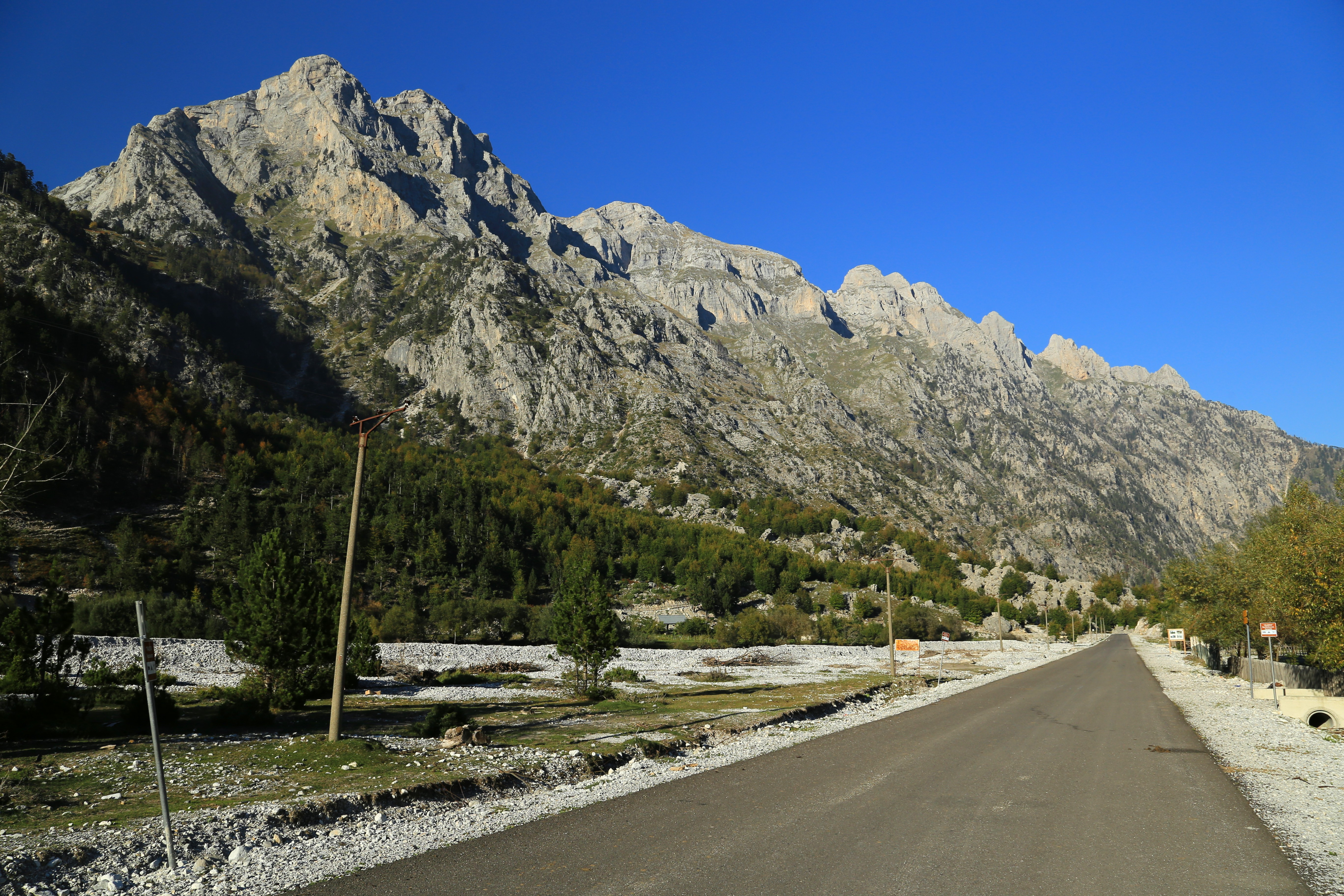
Azem Hajdari entrance road towards Valbonë Valley.

The Valbona Valley offers natural and cultural potential for the economic development of the area. The peripheral position, wars, hostile climate, deficient and not functional infrastructure are factors affecting the economic backwardness of Valbona Valley. The population lives mainly from agriculture and farming.

Being a protected area, it makes forestry impossible to be developed. The industry is represented by a Water bottling factory called Valbona. Tourism which recently is being developed rapidly, is considered to be the future's sector of Valbona Valley. However the population still can't provide their living only by tourism.

=== Agriculture ===
Agriculture is ranked on the top in the economical structure of the area since it provides income for majority of the local people. Agricultural land is generally scarce and located on the slopes and some small valleys. Land users care for both, the preservation and cultivation. The land is divided into portions, according to family property. A particular thing of the area is that the possibilities of irrigation of agricultural land are numerous and unlimited. Agricultural land is mainly used to cultivate corn, potato, rye, beans, vegetables and fodder. Agricultural and livestock products are completely natural (organic). Food is generally fresh and home made, but sometimes it can be even canned and processed by the inhabitants of the village. Their way of cooking is entirely traditional. Besides agriculture, inhabitants deal with breeding of livestock such as cattle, sheep, goats, horses, poultry, beekeeping etc. Locals produce products such as meat, milk, wool and skins.

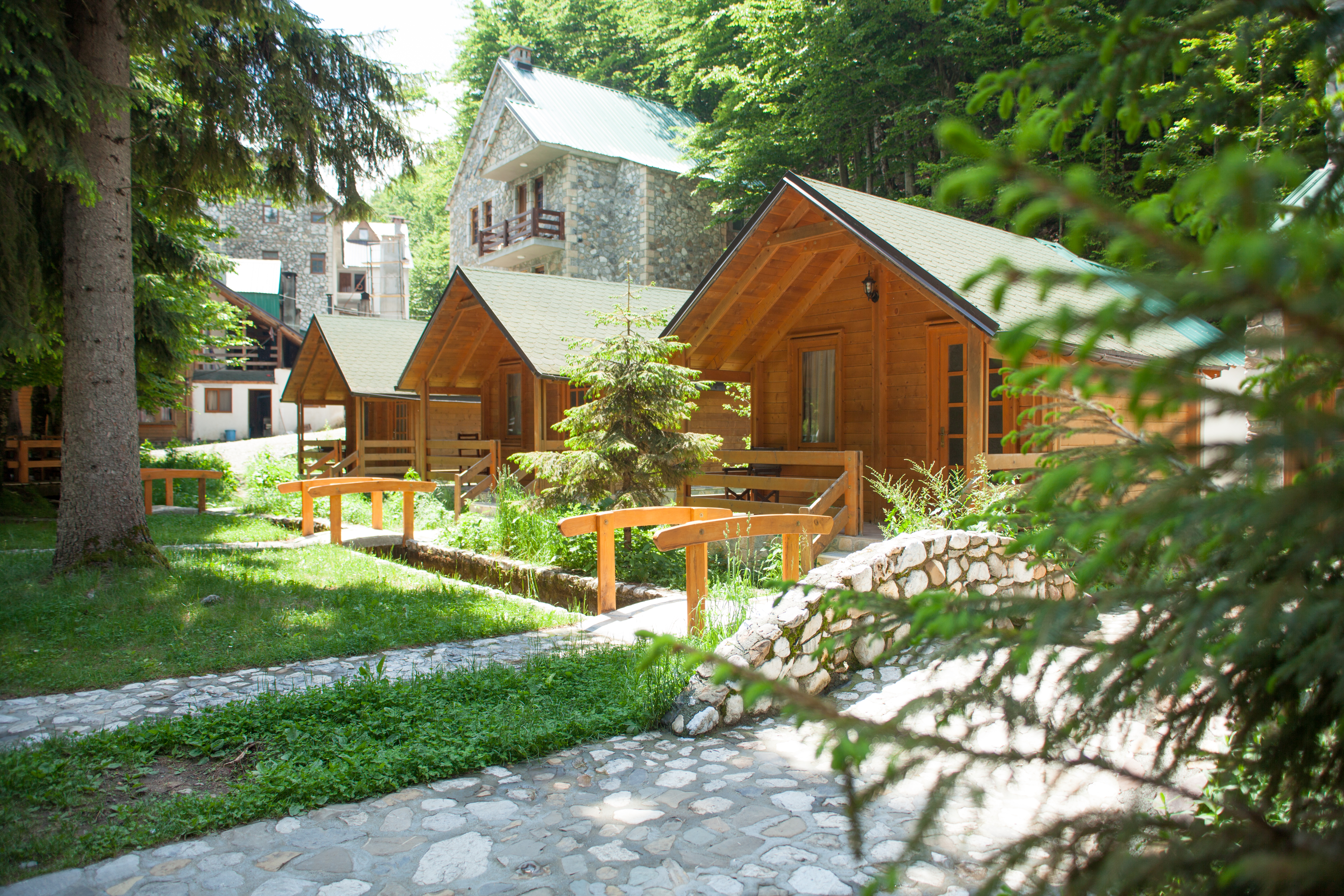
Hotel Fusha e Gjes, one of the first and largest hotels in the valley

=== Tourism ===
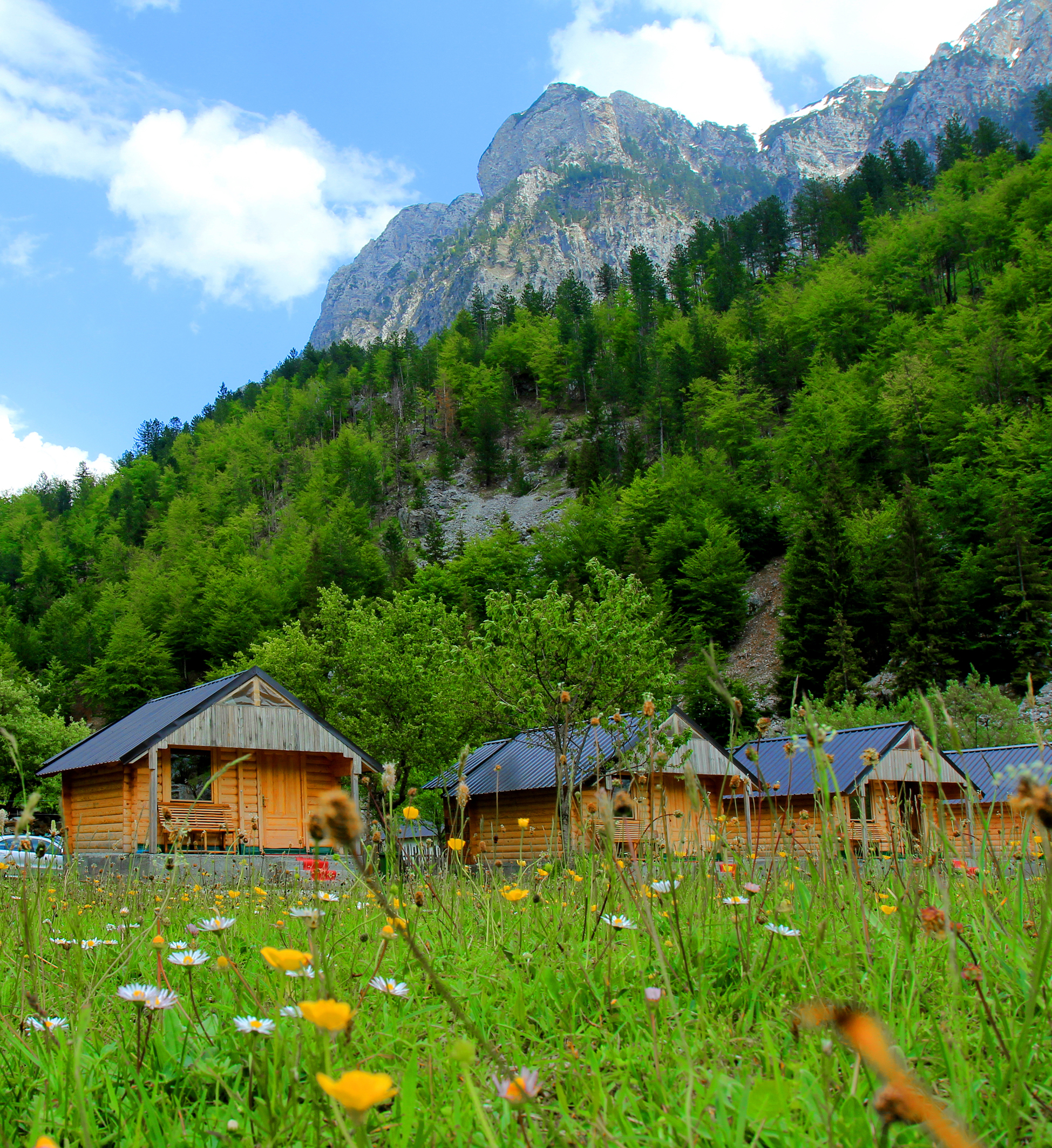
Small chalets in Valbona

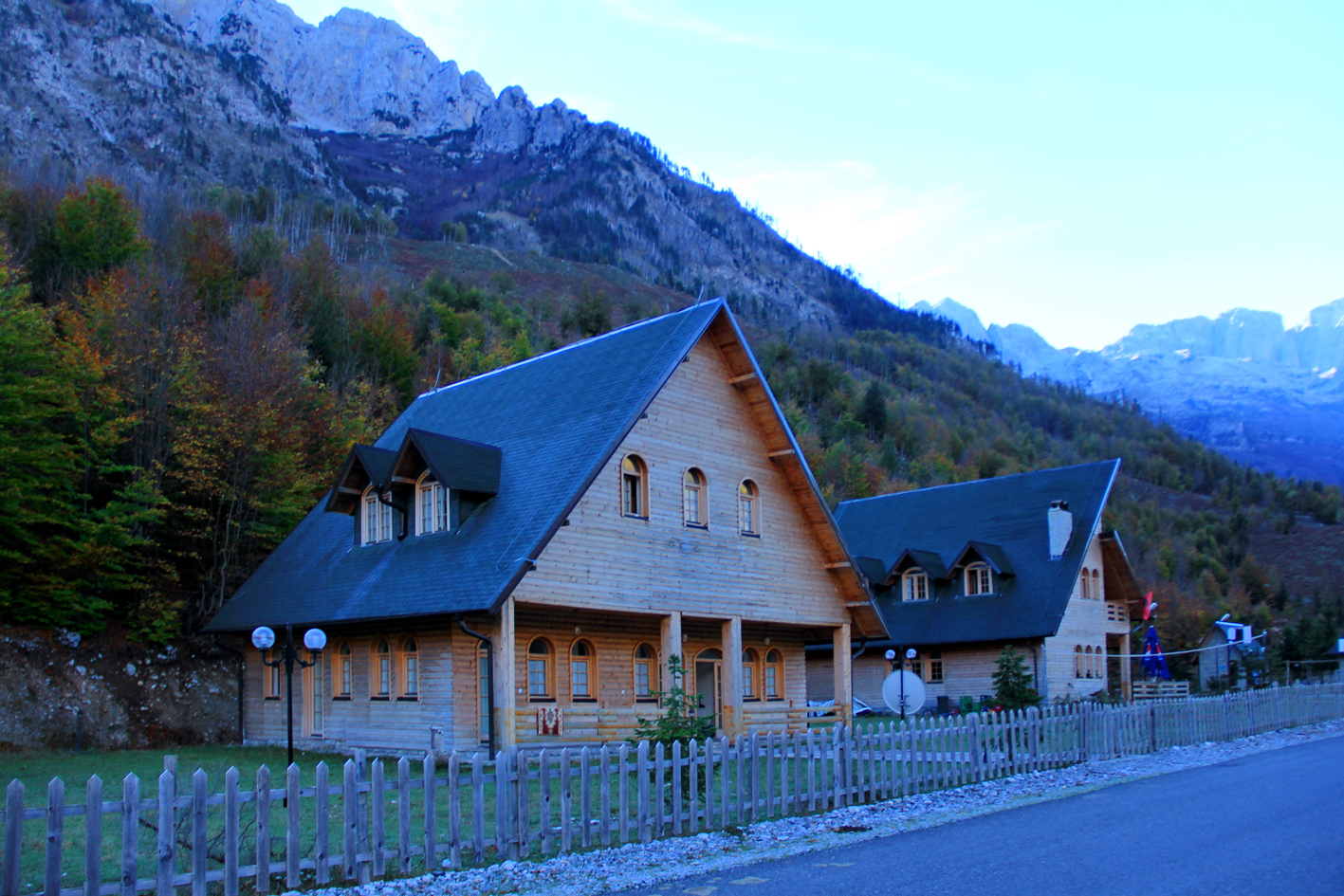
Valbona Tourist Info Point (TIP) Guesthouse opened in 2012, and expanded in 2019

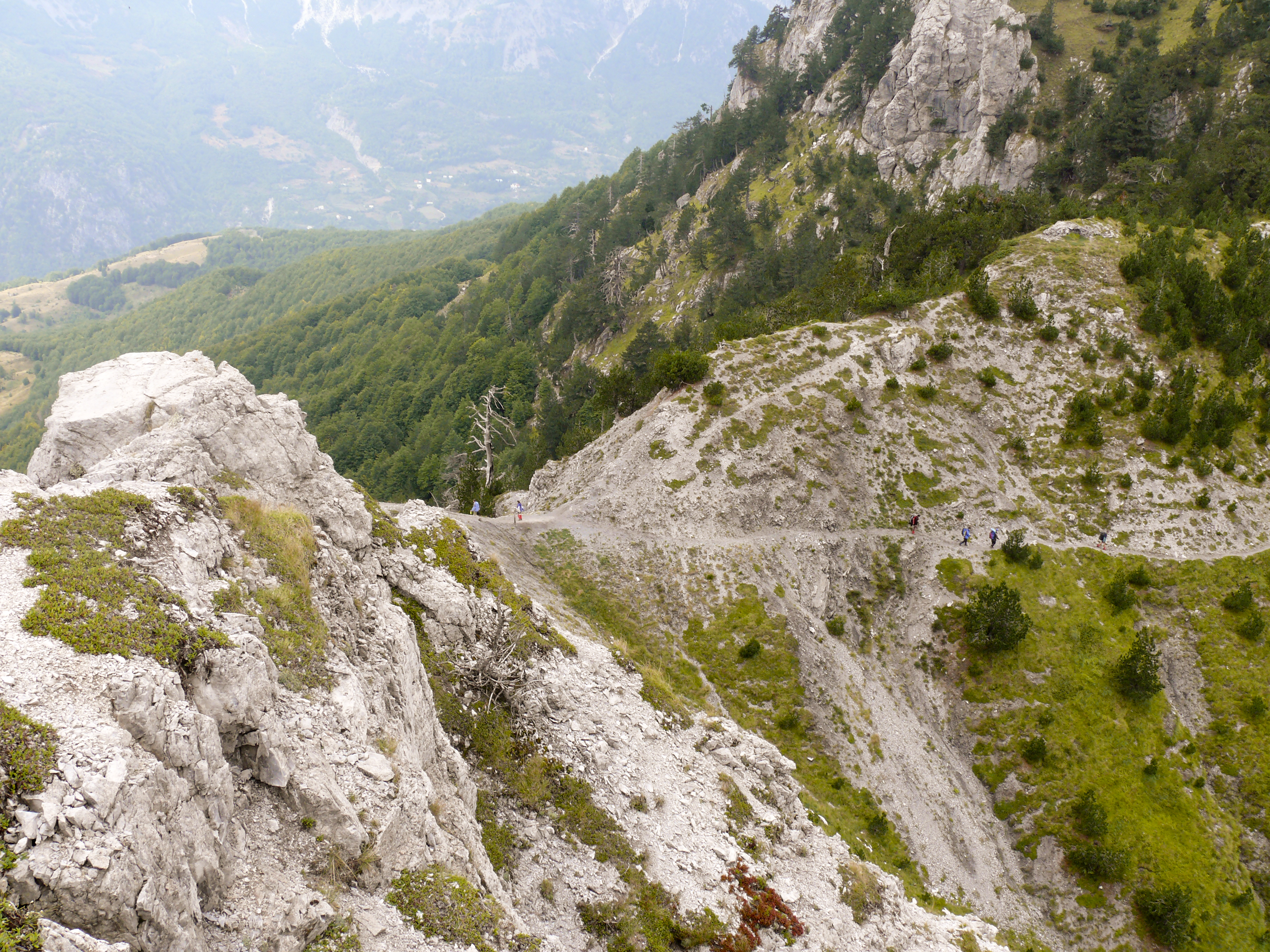
Valbona Pass (42°24′21″N 19°48′55″E)

Considering the benefits that tourism can provide, the national government has classified it as a priority. Even though it is based mainly on nature, the tourism in Valbona requires the necessary infrastructure. The rocky peaks of mountains such as the Mount Jezercë, Kollata e Keqe Mount, Pecmarra Mount attract the attention of visitors. The Valbona River is unnavigable because of the frequent rains. The nature is rich in suitable varieties for tourism such as fishing and mountaineering. The numerous potentials of the valley enable the developing of several types of tourism such as climbing, white, rowing, rural, cultural, gastronomic, medical and adventurous tourism.

- Alpinism is based at the presence of high mountains. Foreign tourists practise mostly this kind of tourism in Valbona.
- White tourism and heliskiing in particular has taken off as a substitute to the organized alpine resort structures, as the infrastructure needed for this kind of tourism is not suitable, despite the presence of snow for about 6 months.
- Rural, cultural and gastronomic tourism is based in the locals lifestyle, legacy and traditions which has been treasured by them.
- Medical tourism is based on the healthy climate, clean air and water and the organic foods that valley offers.
- Adventure tourism has suitable conditions to be developed due to the wild nature.

Local people are building up their income with tourism activities such as renting rooms, accompanied by characteristic local hospitality and traditional home made cooking. Initiated and supported by the Government of Albania, the Albanian Development Fund and Margegaj Municipality is being built a tourism complex which should accommodate around 500 people, on a surface of 4200 m2. Valbona National Park is expected to be one of the most important oases of the country. Clean air, high mountain peaks, lakes, numerous water resources, forests, mountains, flora and fauna of Valbona Valley National Park provide conditions for eco-tourism experiences.

=== Hydroelectric power plants ===
The future of tourism in the valley is being seriously challenged by the construction of hydroelectric power plants on Valbona River.

In January 2016, local people in Valbona Valley National Park learned of the plans to build as many as 14 hydropower plants along 30 km of Valbona River, 8 of them wholly within the National Park. The procedure and content of the projects' environmental impact assessments demonstrate non-transparent decision making, disregard for local communities' well-being and indifference towards high conservation value ecosystems, including a complete disregard of the fact that the development is occurring in a protected area.

Even though issuing of permits for such activity is illegal on protected areas, the government has backed down from revoking licenses citing expensive legal recourses which it can't afford to pay to developers. On the other side, local activists are organizing various awareness campaigns called Don't Touch My Valbona' (Mos ma prek Valbonen in Albanian) to pressure authorities to stop the construction of the plants which are well under way along a section of Valbona River.

== Gallery ==
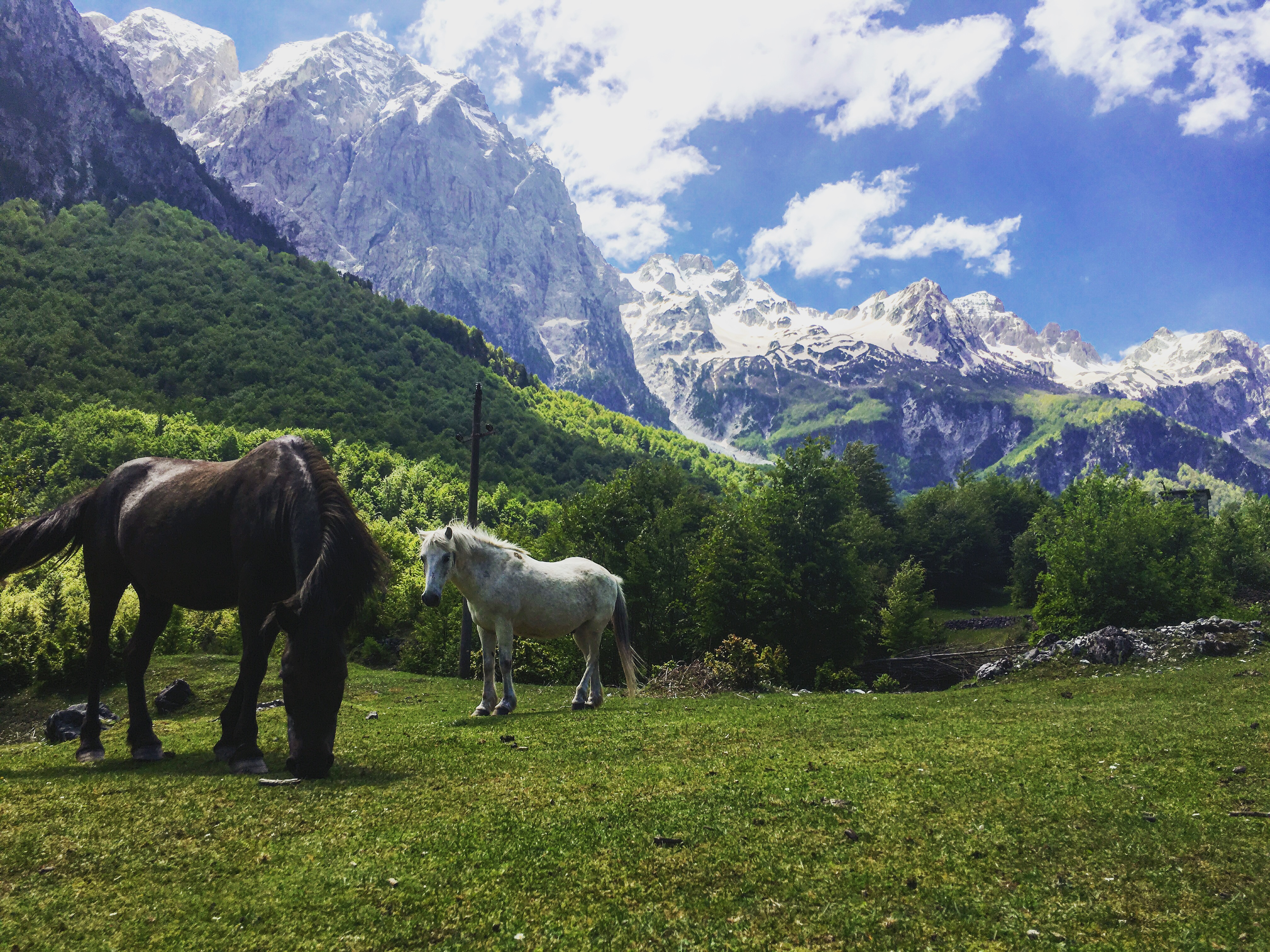
Albanian horses in the park

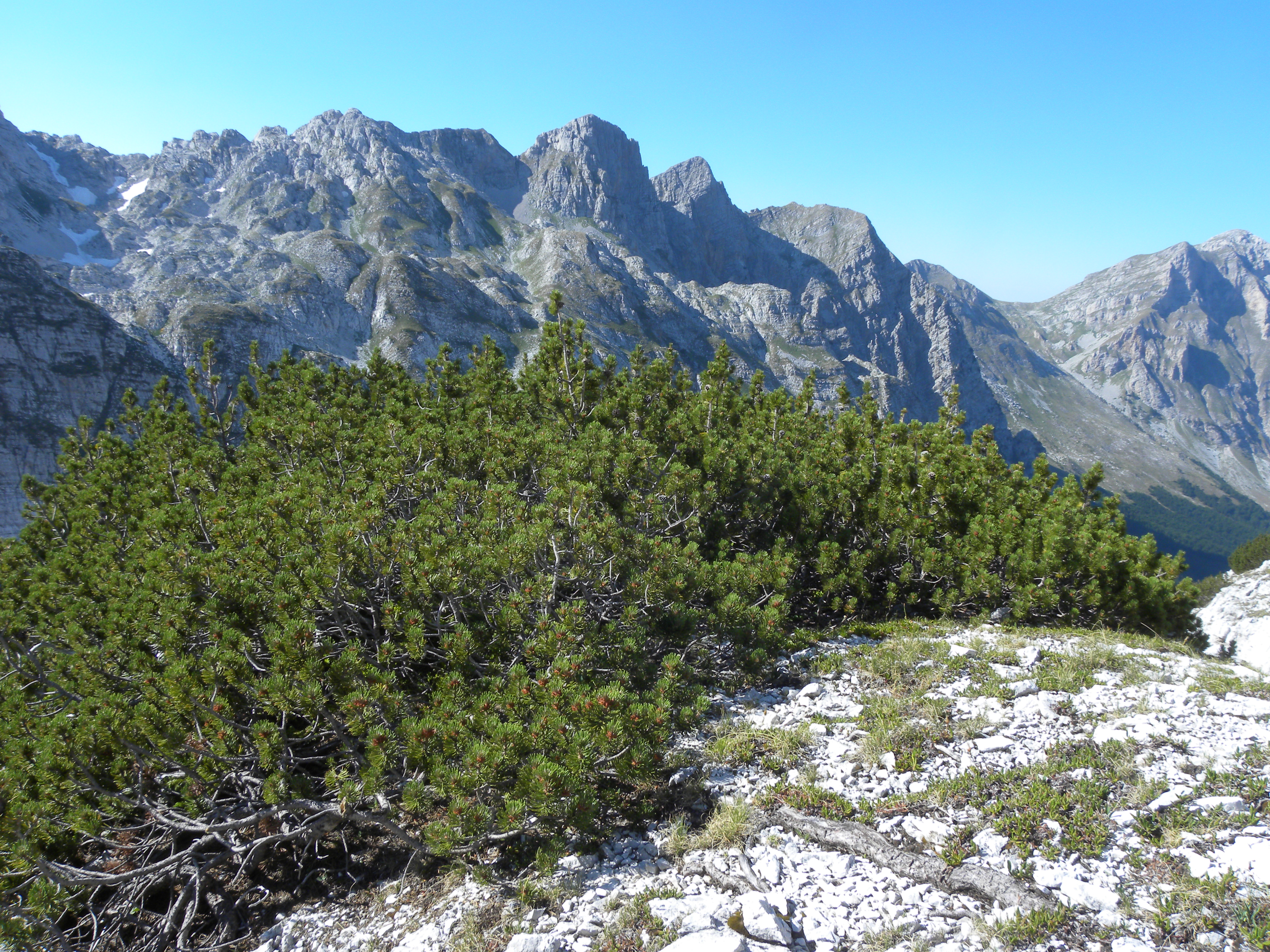
Maja Jezercë

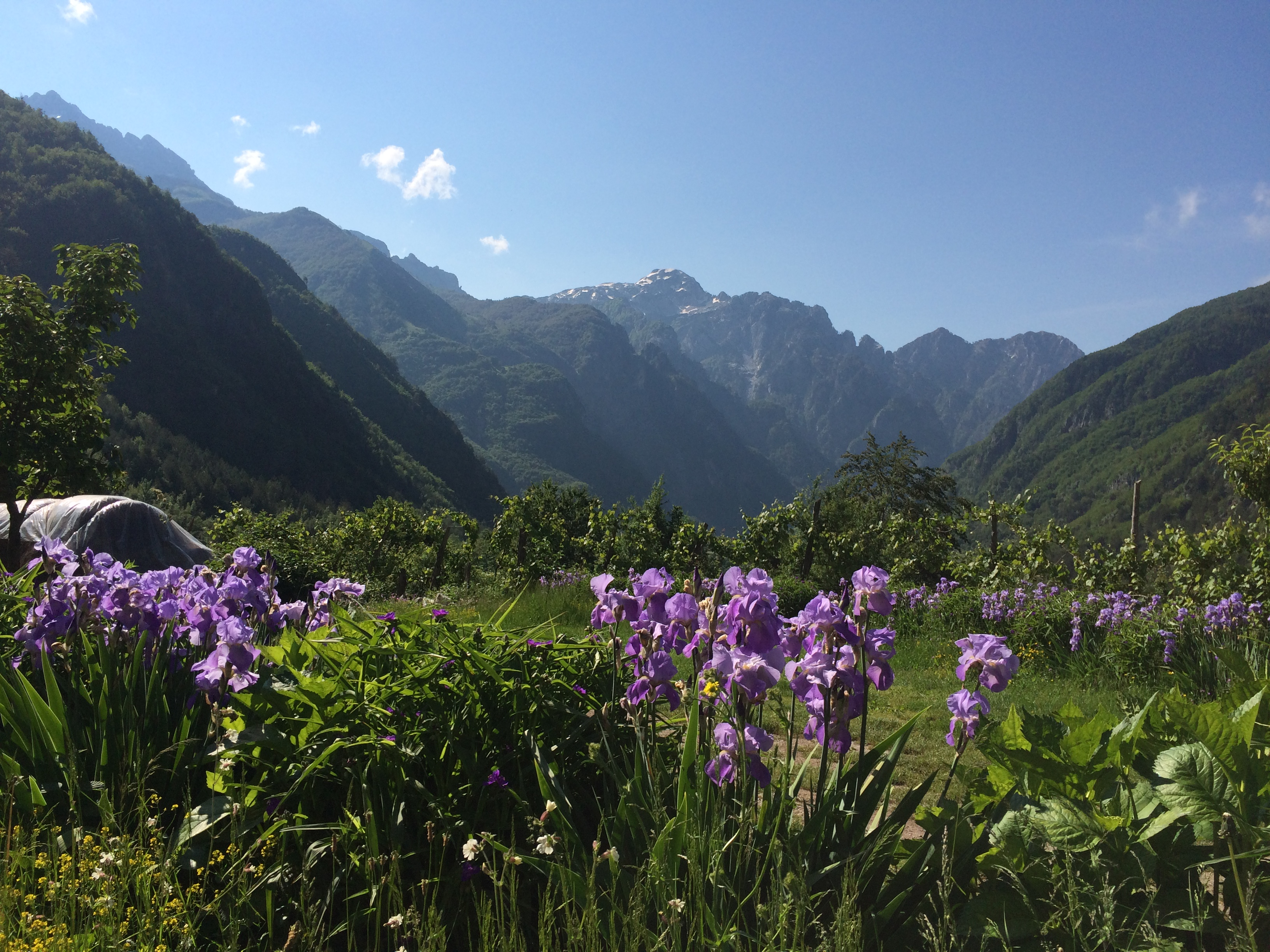
The endemic Tulipa albanica on the park

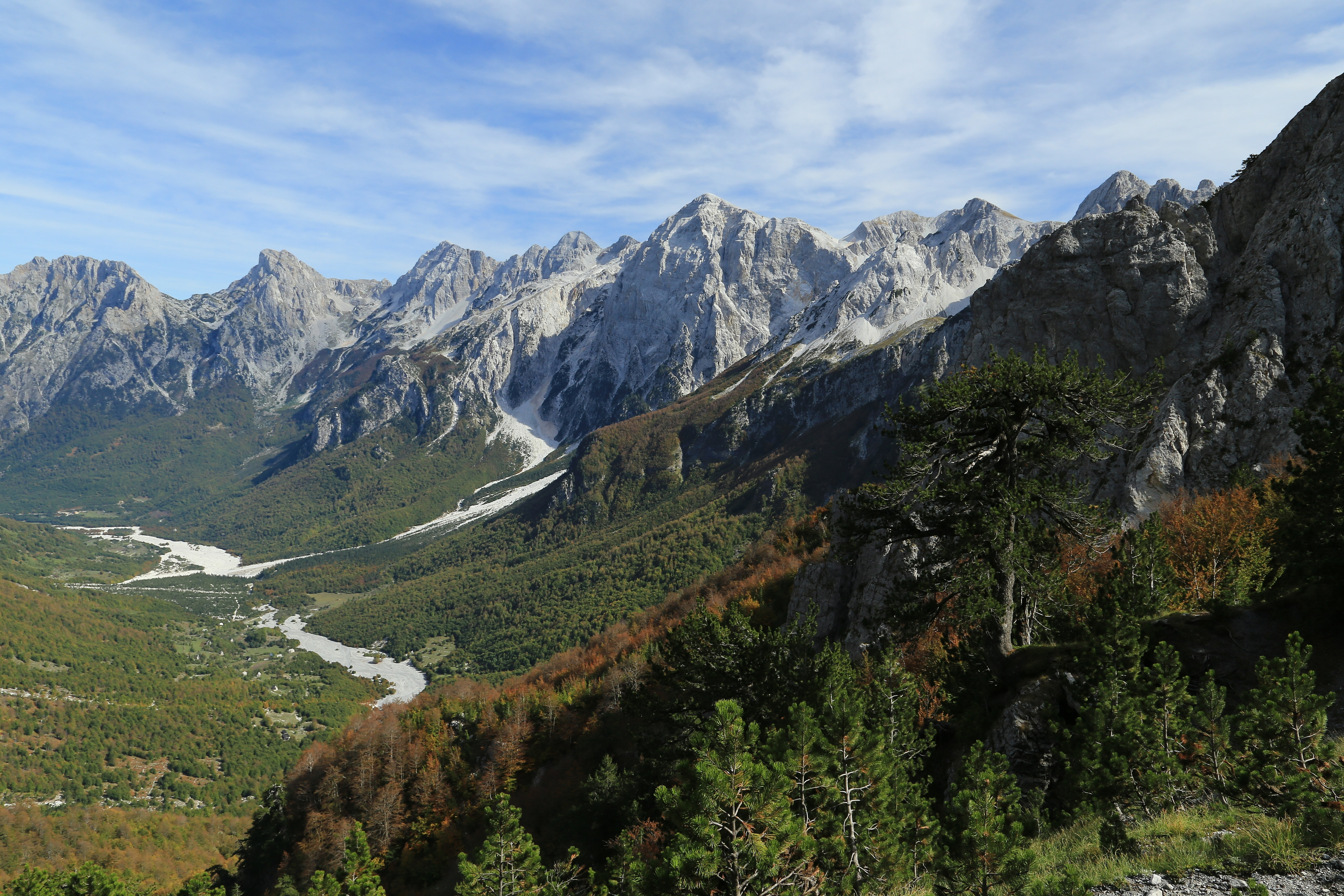
The valley formed by the Shalë river

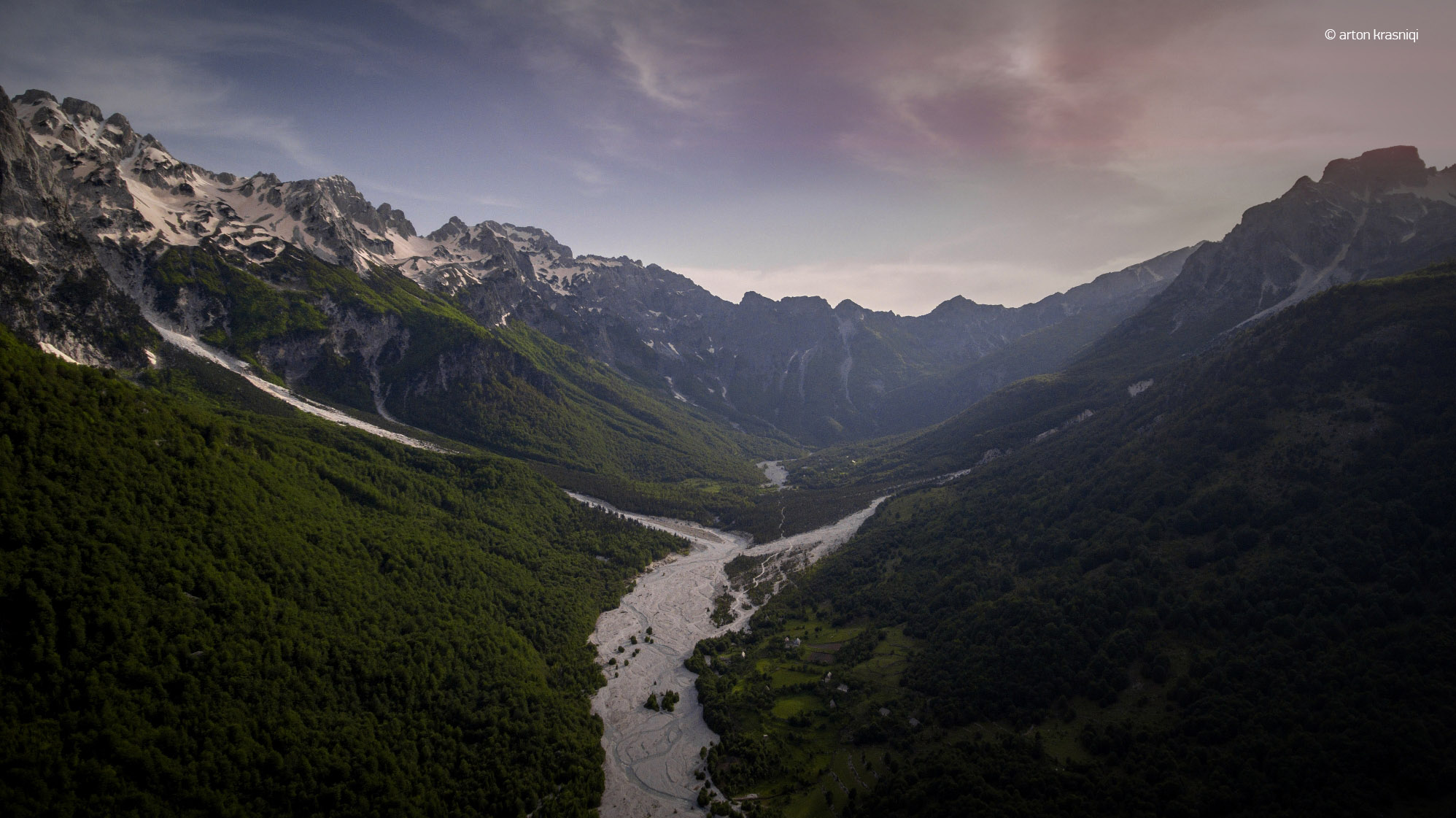
During the twillight

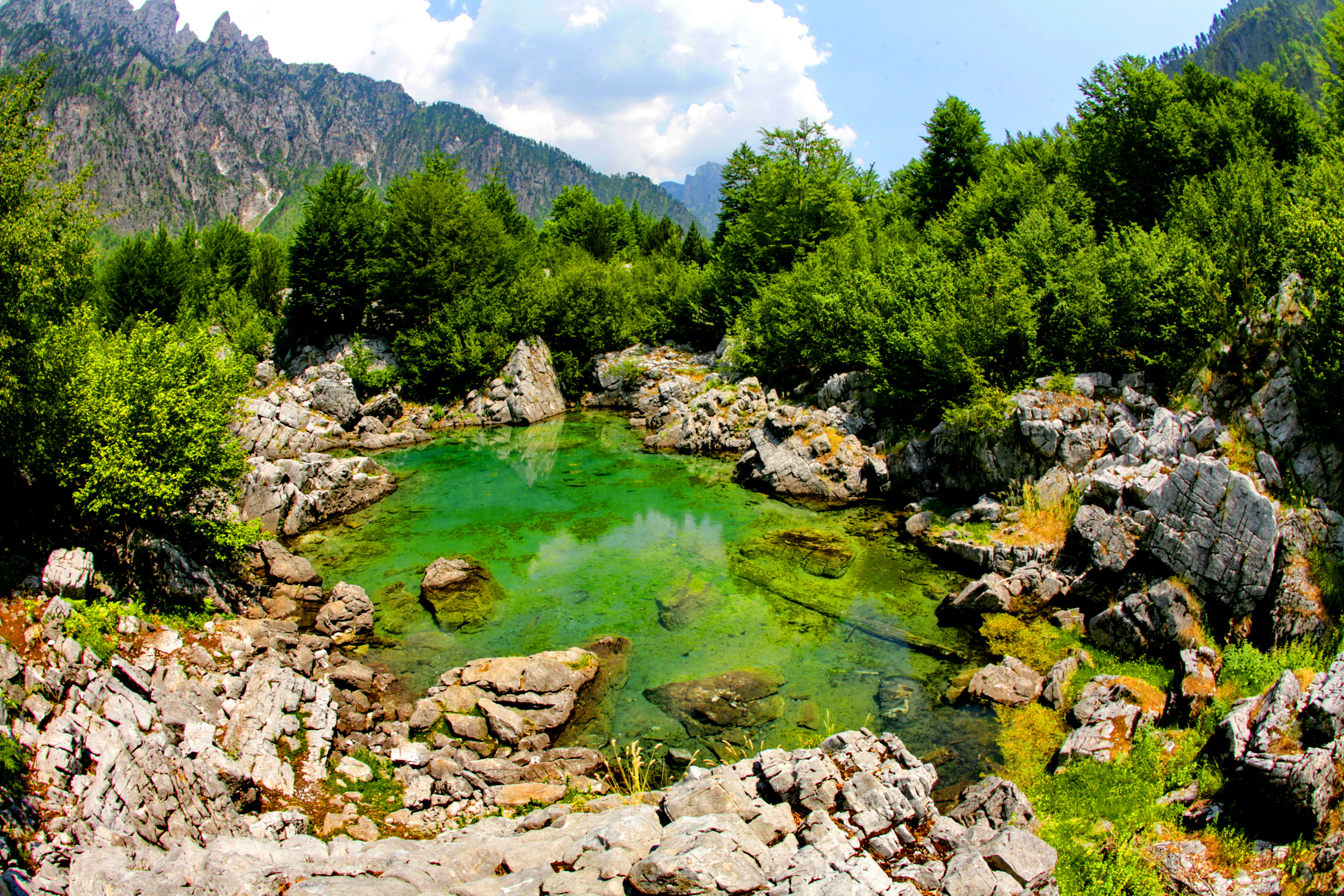
Xhemas Lake

== See also ==
- Geography of Albania
- Protected areas of Albania
- Biodiversity of Albania
- Albanian Alps
- Dear Albania
