= Mali i Krujës =

Mountain in Albania

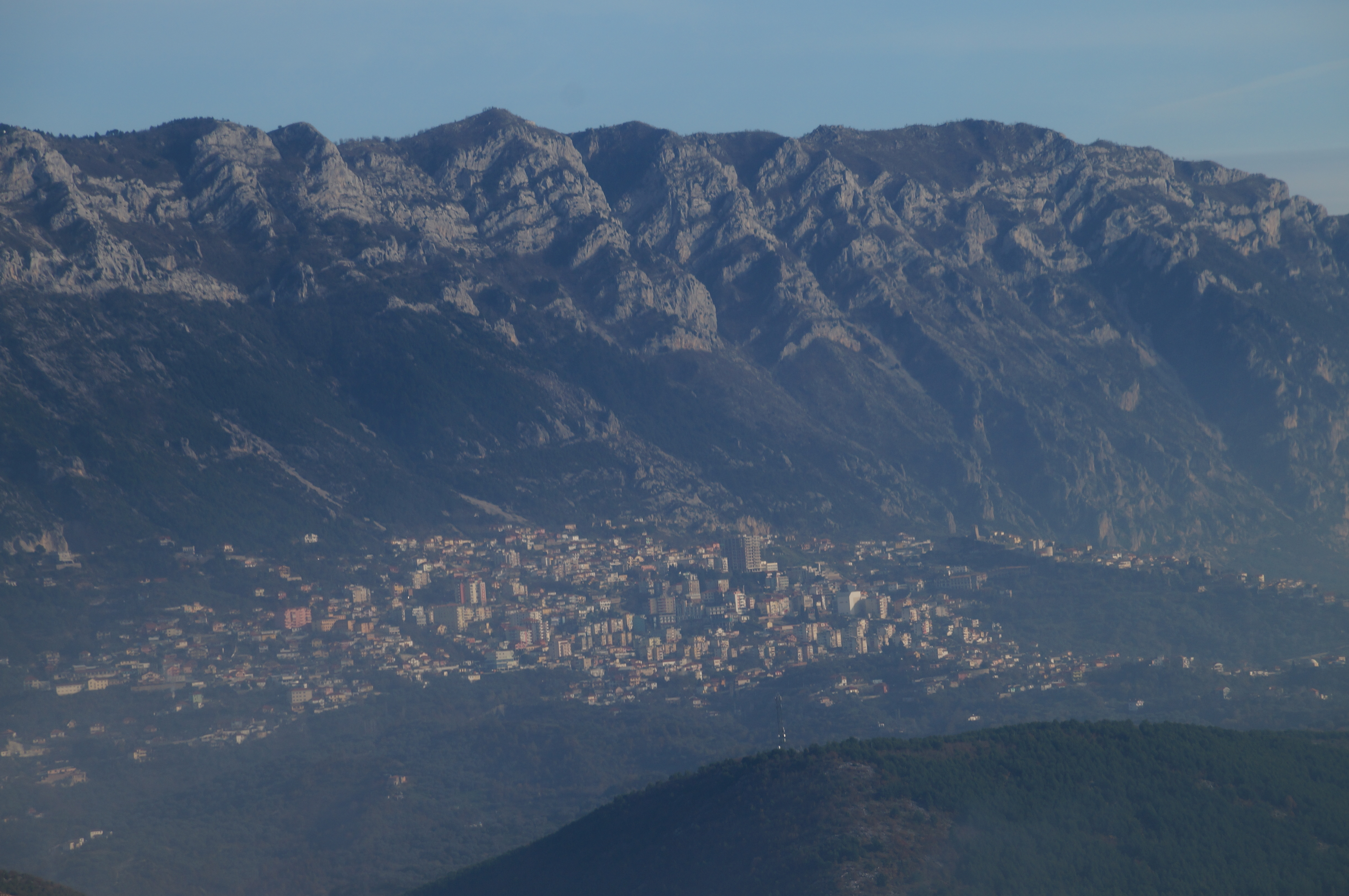
- Mali i Krujës seen from a distance

Highest point
- Elevation: 1,150 m (3,770 ft)
- Prominence: 398 m (1,306 ft)
- Isolation: 3.3 km (2.1 mi)
- Coordinates: 41°30′30″N 19°48′32″E

Geography
- Location within Albania
- Country: Albania
- Region: Central Mountain Region
- Municipality: Krujë
- Parent range: Skanderbeg Mountains

Geology
- Rock age(s): Late Cretaceous, Eocene, Oligocene
- Mountain type: massif
- Rock type(s): limestone, flysch

Mali i Krujës is a mountain in central Albania, situated within the municipal boundaries of Krujë, overlooking the city. It forms part of the Krujë–Dajti mountain chain and rises to an elevation of 1,150 m (3,770 ft) above sea level, spanning over an area of approximately 1,408 ha (3,480 acres).

== Geology ==
Mali i Krujës stands out prominently in the surrounding landscape, resembling a natural fortress with sweeping views, particularly toward the Adriatic Sea. It is primarily composed of Late Cretaceous and Eocene limestone, while its lower slopes are largely covered by Oligocene flysch. Morphologically, the mountain represents a folded linear structure, with an overturned western flank intersected by tectonic faults.

To the northwest, the terrain gradually transitions into a gentler karst landscape, extending toward the towns of Laç and Milot. The southeastern face descends abruptly above the Zeza Gorge, which separates the mountain from Mali i Gamtit and Mali i Brarit. At riverbed level, the gorge measures approximately 4 meters wide, narrowing to just 1.5 meters in some sections. The surrounding cliffs rise between 700 and 800 meters, with steep inclines ranging from 50° to 70°, forming dramatic vertical escarpments.

== Biodiversity ==
Vegetation is relatively sparse, consisting mainly of oak and beech forests, with conifers appearing along the carbonate slopes, especially on the western side. In the gorges that cut through the range, vegetation becomes denser due to favorable climatic conditions, including sheltered exposure and warm maritime winds.

Mediterranean evergreen shrubs dominate the undergrowth, forming dense thickets of myrtle, heath, holm oak and mastic. In some areas, this vegetation is so thick that it renders parts of the landscape nearly impassable.

== Attractions ==
On the mountain's slopes lies the sacred site of Sarisalltik, a place of pilgrimage and religious importance in Albanian Bektashi tradition. The site draws visitors for both religious devotion and cultural interest.

Mali i Krujës is a well-known spot for ecotourism and outdoor activities such as hiking, walking and nature exploration. Its varied landscape offers opportunities for recreation and relaxation. Tourist amenities, including cafés and restaurants, are available nearby.

== See also ==
- List of mountains in Albania
