= Pllaja e Pusit =

Summit in Albania

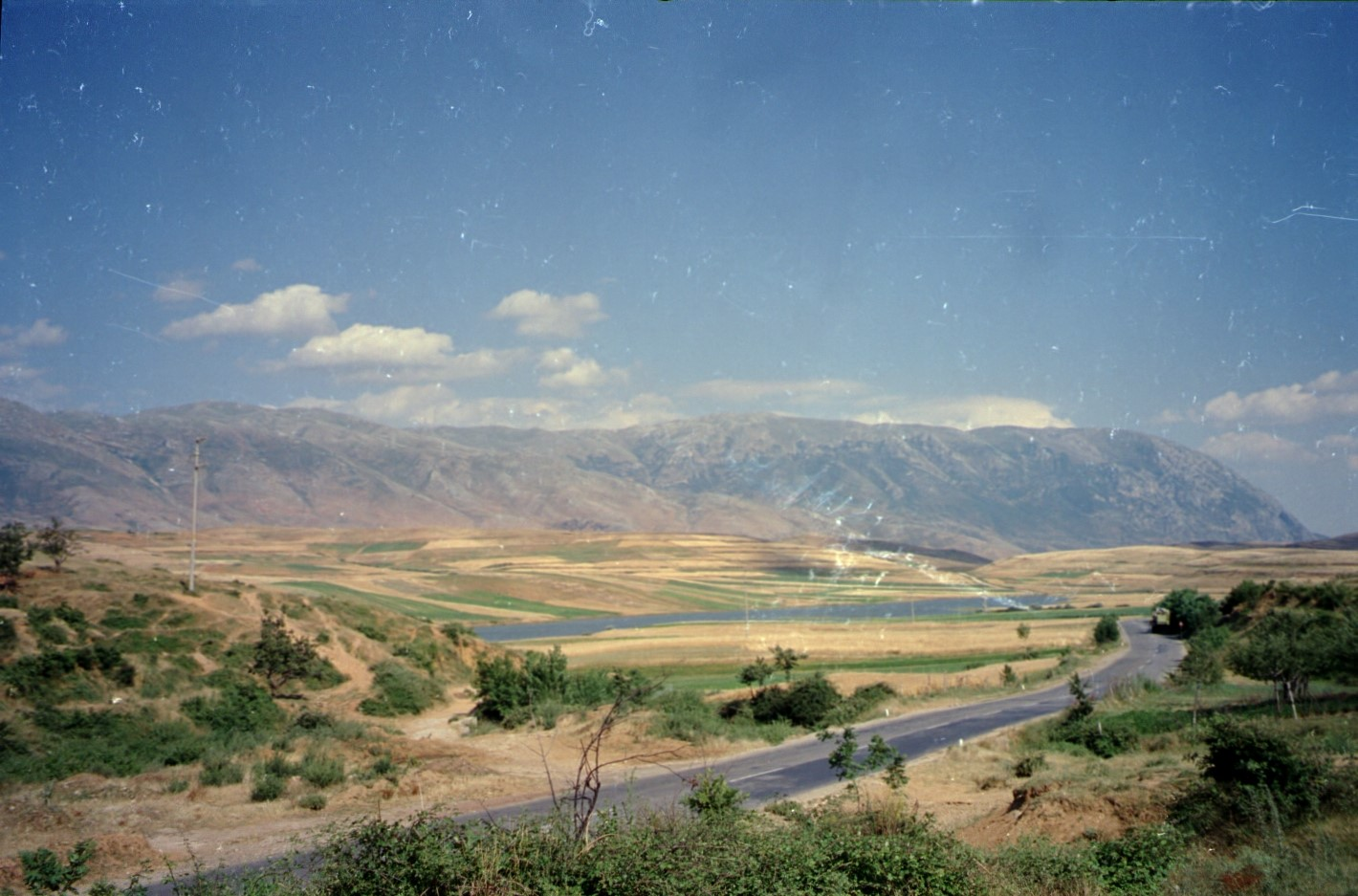
- View of the summit from a distance

Highest point
- Elevation: 2,287 m (7,503 ft)
- Prominence: 1,121 m (3,678 ft)
- Isolation: 30.3 km (18.8 mi)
- Listing: Ribu
- Coordinates: 40°52′59″N 20°50′25″E

Naming
- English translation: Well Plateau

Geography
- Location within Albania
- Country: Albania
- Region: Central Mountain Region
- Municipality: Pogradec, Korçë
- Parent range: Mali i Thatë–Rakicë–Llapisht

Geology
- Rock age: Mesozoic
- Mountain type: massif
- Rock type: limestone

Pllaja e Pusit (lit. 'Well Plateau') is a high mountain plateau and summit located in southeastern Albania, near the border with North Macedonia. Reaching an elevation of 2,287 m (7,503 ft) above sea level, it represents the highest point of the Mali i Thatë massif.

== Geology ==
Pllaja e Pusit lies along the ridge of Mali i Thatë, a limestone massif characterized by steep rocky slopes that rise toward a broader, flattened summit area, from which the site takes its name. In Albanian, pllajë means plateau.

Because of its elevated position, the summit is sometimes described as a natural "balcony", overlooking three major lakes: Ohrid, Great Prespa and Small Prespa.

Its geological composition has limited the presence of surface water sources, leading to the development of typical karst landforms.

== Biodiversity ==
The summit region consists mainly of alpine pastures while the lower elevations support mixed forests, including oak and beech, transitioning into open grasslands at higher altitudes.

== Climbing route ==
One of the most common routes begins near the village of Alarup. The ascent entails an elevation gain of approximately 1,250 meters and a total hiking distance of about 12 kilometers, requiring seven hours to complete.

== See also ==
- Prespa National Park
- List of mountains in Albania
