= Myrsini Malakou =

Greek biologist

- Occupation: Biologist
- Awards: Goldman Environmental Prize (2001)

Myrsini Malakou is a Greek biologist. She was awarded the Goldman Environmental Prize in 2001, for her contributions to the protection of the wetlands of Préspa, jointly with fellow biologist Giorgos Catsadorakis. Their work in Prèspa led to the development of the first transboundary preserve in the Balkans, along the border of Albania, Greece, and North Macedonia. They promoted the conservation of the wetlands by focusing on organic farming and traditional environmental practices. Malakou is credited for her research of the threatened dalmatian pelicans in the area.

She has been the managing director of the Society for the Protection of Prèspa since its founding in 1991.
