= Shebenik =

Mountain in Albania

- Mali i Shebenikut
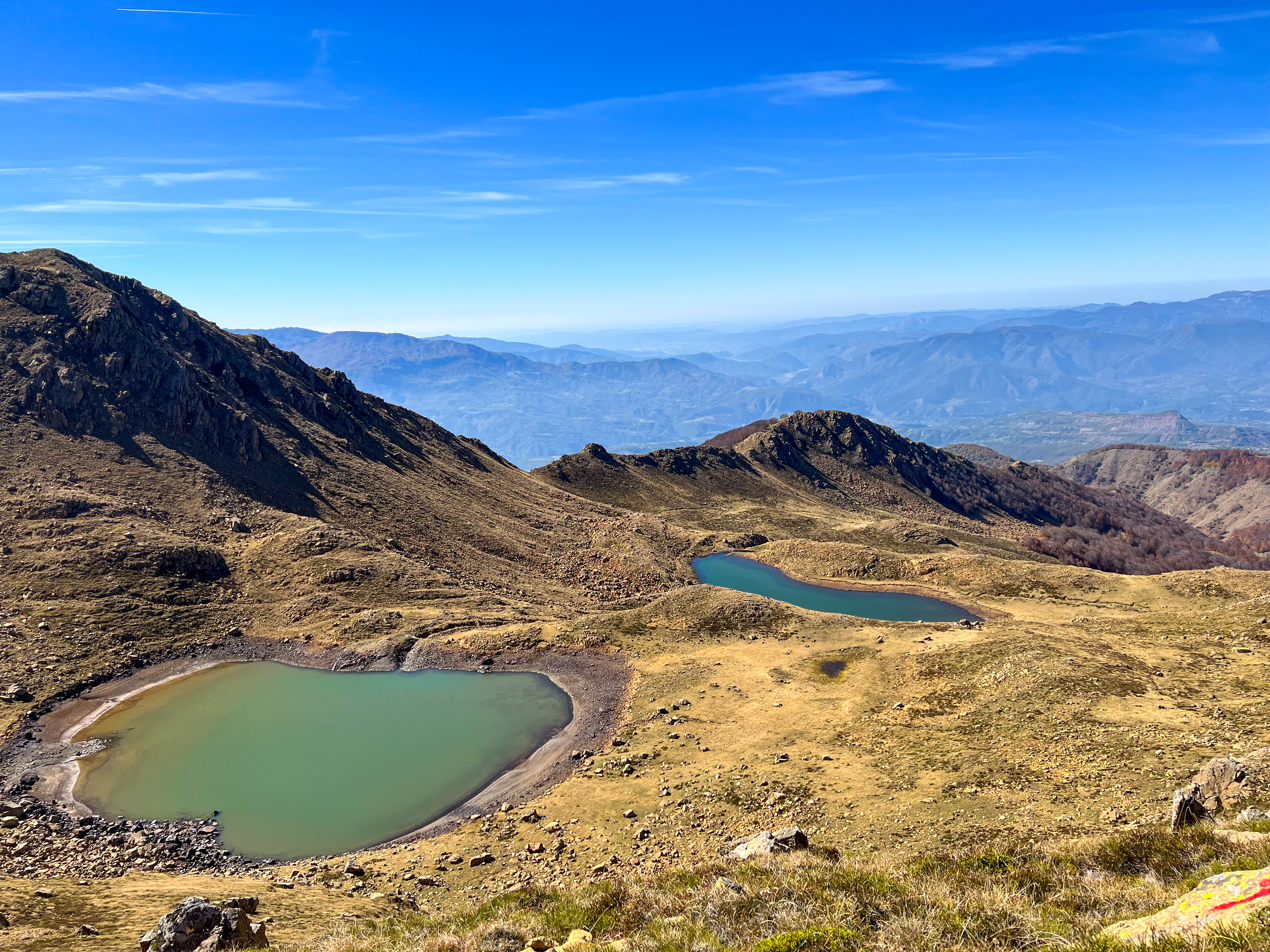
- Dragostunja Lakes on Mount Shebenik

Highest point
- Elevation: 2,265 m (7,431 ft)
- Prominence: 1,336 m (4,383 ft)
- Isolation: 30.3 km (18.8 mi)
- Listing: Ribu
- Coordinates: 41°13′00″N 20°27′45″E

Geography
- Location within Albania
- Country: Albania
- Region: Central Mountain Region
- Municipality: Librazhd

Geology
- Mountain type: mountain
- Rock type: ultrabasic rock

Shebenik (def. 'Shebeniku') is a mountain situated northeast of Librazhd municipality, in eastern Albania. Forming the focal point of Shebenik National Park, it is surrounded by the upper Shkumbin valley to the west, Rapuni valley to the northwest and Jabllanica to the south. Its highest peak, Maja e Shebenikut, reaches a height of 2,265 m (7,431 ft) above sea level.

== Geology ==
Composed primarily of ultrabasic rocks, the mountain features a variety of glacial relief forms such as valleys, cirques and glacial lakes, rising above 1,600 m (5,200 ft). The nearby streams of Bushtricë and Qarrishte, which are tributaries of the Shkumbin river, originate from this area.

== Biodiversity ==
Vegetation predominantly consists of beech and oak forests. Bushes can be found in the lower regions, while alpine pastures cover the mountain ridge. The forests of Qarrishte host a diverse collection of wildlife, including bears, wild boars, roe deer, martens and wild pigeons.

The mountain is rich in iron-nickel and chrome ores, which are extracted from the mines of Bushtricë and Pishkash.

== See also ==
- List of mountains in Albania
- Shebenik National Park
