= Mali i Thatë =

Mountain in Albania

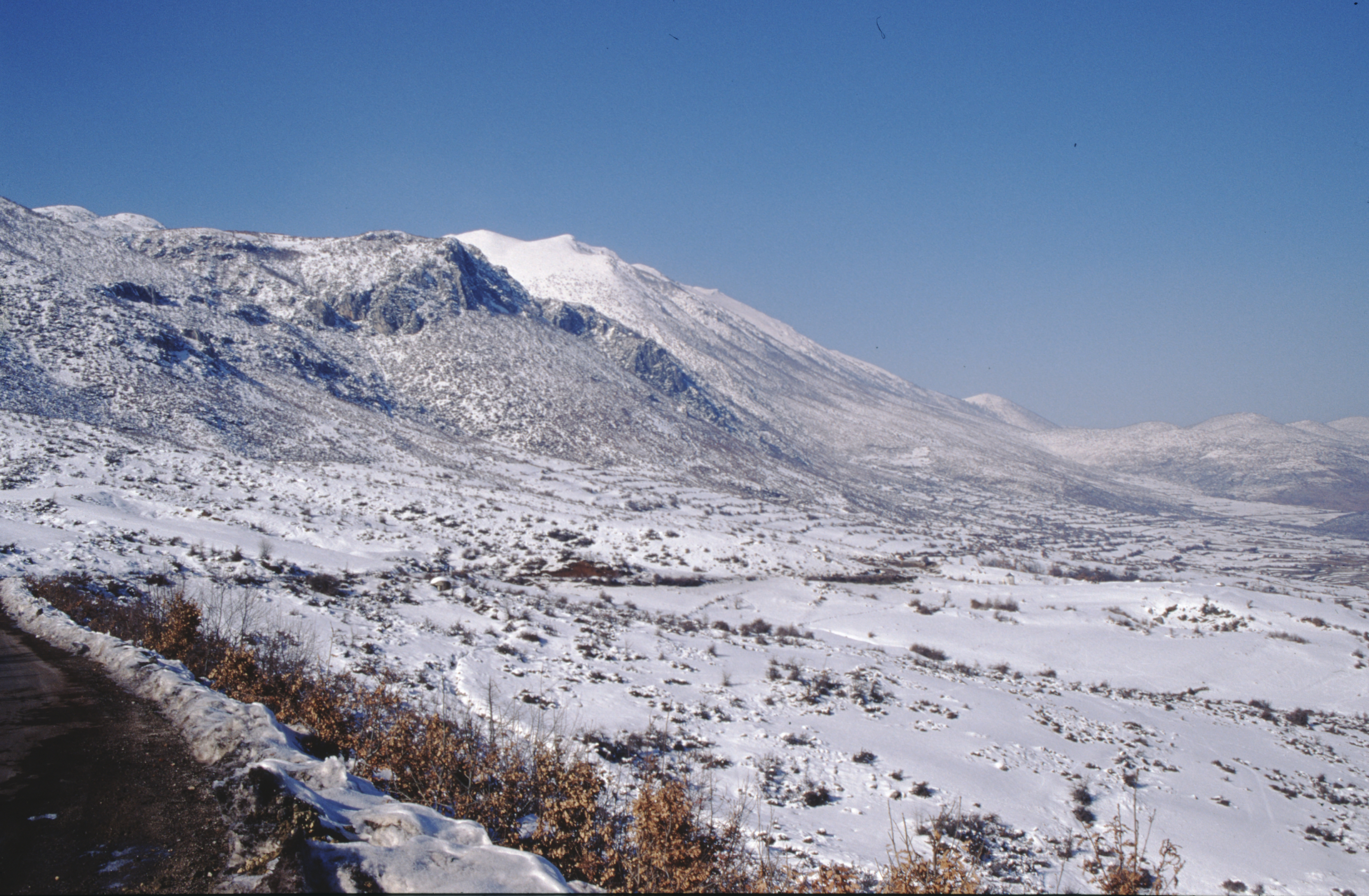
- View of Mali i Thatë near Pustec

Highest point
- Elevation: 2,287 m (7,503 ft)
- Prominence: 1,121 m (3,678 ft)
- Isolation: 30.3 km (18.8 mi)
- Coordinates: 40°52′59″N 20°50′25″E

Naming
- English translation: Dry Mountain

Geography
- Location within Albania Location within North Macedonia
- Countries: Albania; North Macedonia
- Region: Central Mountain Region
- Municipality: Pogradec, Korçë
- Parent range: Mali i Thatë–Rakicë–Llapisht

Geology
- Rock age: Mesozoic
- Mountain type: massif
- Rock type: limestone

Mali i Thatë (Macedonian: Сува Гора, Suva Gora; Aromanian: Malethate, Malethata) is a massif in southeastern Albania, situated along the administrative boundary between the municipalities of Korçë and Pogradec. It rises to an elevation of 2,287 m (7,503 ft) at its highest point, Pllaja e Pusit. A small section of the massif overlaps into the Macedonian territory, known locally as Galičica.

== Geology ==
Mali i Thatë has a pronounced anticlinal structure and is composed almost entirely of Mesozoic limestone. Its relief is dominated by steep slopes, particularly on the western flank, while the crest is characterized by extensive, nearly flat surfaces, heavily marked by karst depressions and sinkholes.

Numerous springs emerge along the western foothills, most notably the Drilon and Tushemisht springs. Together, they form an important component of the hydrological system that feeds Lake Ohrid and its surrounding wetlands.

== Biodiversity ==
Vegetation at higher elevations is dominated by alpine pastures. On the eastern slopes, where climatic conditions are comparatively more favorable, forests of beech and oak are well developed, accompanied by shrub communities, thus creating a gradual transition from closed woodland to open high-mountain grasslands.

== Natural resources ==
The massif contains deposits of iron-bearing bauxite and chalk, particularly in the area of Goricë, which have been documented in regional geological surveys.

== See also ==
- Prespa National Park
- List of mountains in Albania
- List of mountains in North Macedonia
