= Cave of Treni =

Cave in southeastern Albania

- IUCN category III (natural monument or feature)
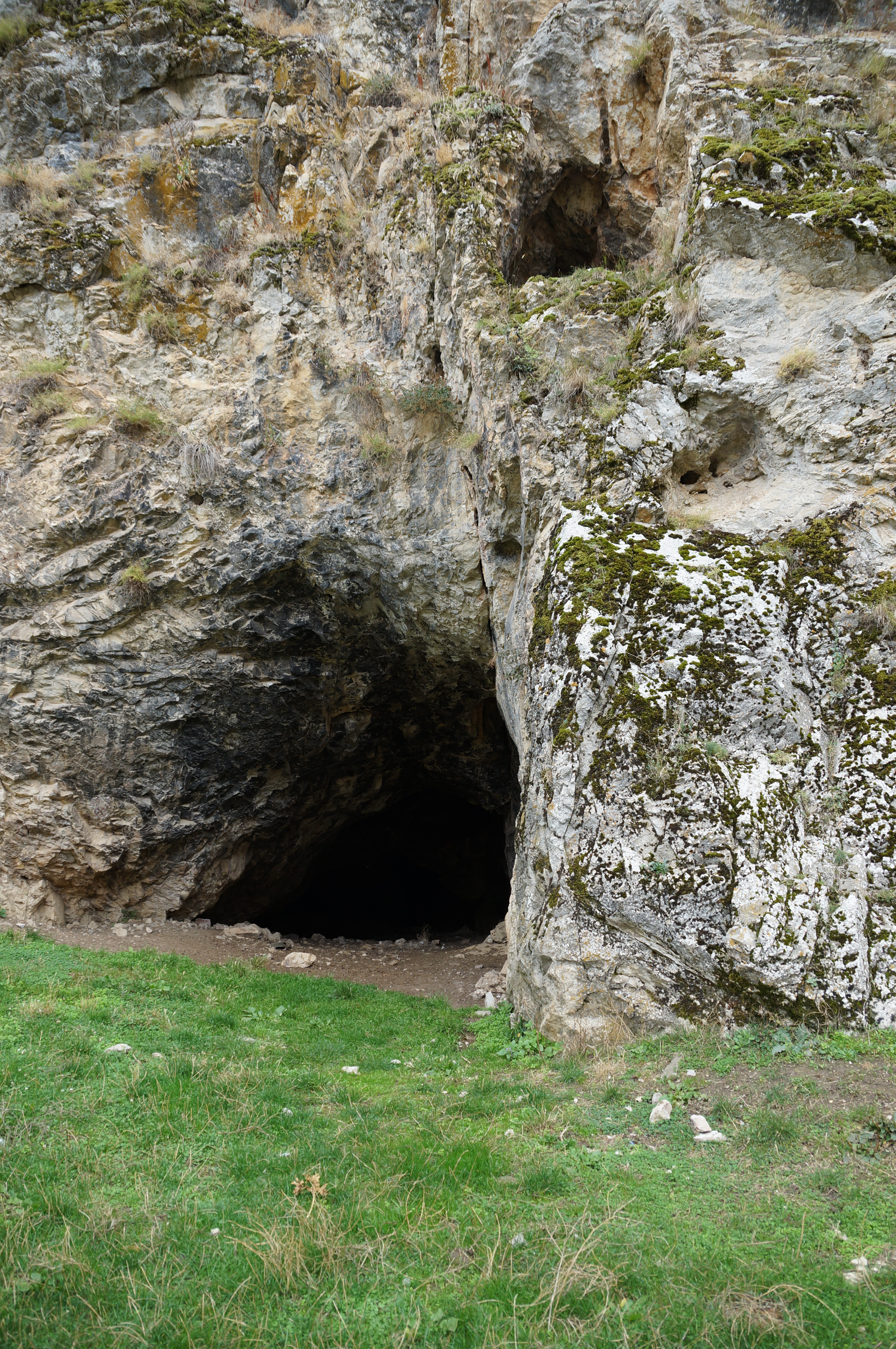
- Cave entrance

- Location within Albania
- Interactive map of Cave of Treni
- Location: Korçë County
- Nearest city: Korçë
- Coordinates: 40°40′N 20°59′E
- Designation: Natural Monument
- Governing body: Ministry of Environment

The Cave of Treni (Albanian: Shpella e Trenit) is a cave in southeastern Albania, located on the shore of the Small Prespa Lake close to the villages of Treni and Devoll in Korçë County. The cave has a length of 20 m (66 ft) with a width which can vary between 10–12 m (33–39 ft).

== See also ==
- Geography of Albania
- Protected areas of Albania
- Prespa National Park
