= Jablanica (mountain) =

Mountain range in the border between Albania and North Macedonia

- Jabllanicë, Јабланица
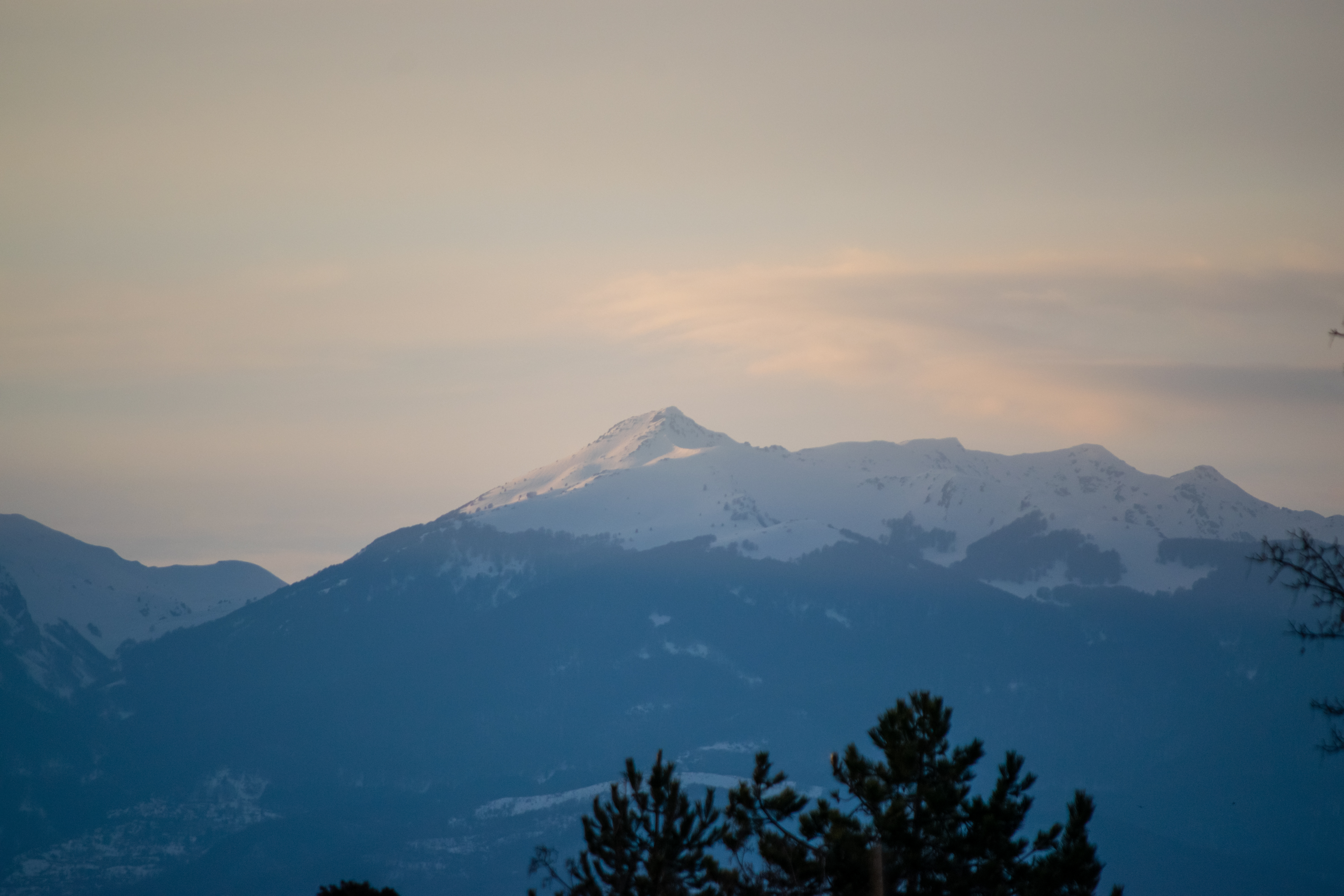
- Black Rock is the highest peak in Jablanica and marks the delineation point between Albania and North Macedonia

Highest point
- Elevation: 2,257 m (7,405 ft)
- Prominence: 456 m (1,496 ft)
- Isolation: 6.0 km (3.7 mi)
- Coordinates: 41°14′47″N 20°31′19″E

Geography
- Location within North Macedonia Location within Albania
- Countries: North Macedonia; Albania
- Region: Central Mountain Region
- Municipality: Struga, Librazhd, Dibër

Geology
- Rock age(s): Triassic, Jurassic
- Mountain type: mountain range
- Rock type: limestone

Jablanica (Macedonian: Јабланица pronounced [ˈjabɫanitsa]; Albanian: Jabllanicë) is a mountain range stretching between the state borders of North Macedonia and Albania. A section of the range located within Albania, forms part of the Shebenik National Park, bounded by the municipalities of Librazhd to the southeast and Dibër to the northwest. On the North Macedonia side, it lies within the limits of Struga municipality.

Its highest peak, Black Rock (Albanian: Guri i Zi; Macedonian: Црн Камен), reaches a height of 2,257 m (7,405 ft), marking the delineation point for both countries.

== Geology ==
Composed primarily of Triassic-Jurassic limestones, the range features a complex anticlinal structure with tectonic detachments. It resembles a large elevated horst, surrounded by tectonic-erosive slopes, the most prominent of which are found on the western and eastern margins, near Rrethi i Kurorës and Rajcë, respectively. As the mountain range descends southeastward, it becomes less elevated due to subsidence in the Ohrid graben. The northwestern section of the range is rugged and shaped by glacial and karst processes, while the southeastern side contains predominantly flat and pitted surfaces bounded by steep slopes.

The ridge features several karst plateaus, namely Rrethi i Kurorës and Trishilka, that display various karst formations, predominantly small-sized karst pits. Glacial forms like cirques are fewer and less developed on the western slope, while the eastern slope includes numerous complex ones that transition into glacial troughs.

== Biodiversity ==
Forest vegetation is sparse, mainly covered by beech trees and summer pastures. Jablanica serves as a rare habitat for the Balkan lynx, a subspecies of the Eurasian lynx, whose vulnerable population is estimated to be less than 100, making this area particularly significant for their conservation.

== See also ==
- List of mountains in North Macedonia
- List of mountains in Albania
