= Giorgos Catsadorakis =

Greek biologist

- Occupation: Biologist
- Awards: Goldman Environmental Prize (2001)

Giorgos Catsadorakis is a Greek biologist. He was awarded the Goldman Environmental Prize in 2001, for his contributions to the protection of the wetlands of Préspa, jointly with fellow biologist Myrsini Malakou. Their efforts resulted in an agreement between Greece, the Republic of Macedonia and Albania on establishing the Préspa Park as a protected area of the region.
