= Prespa National Park (Albania) =

National park and tourist attraction in southeastern Albania

- Parku Kombëtar i Prespës
- IUCN category II (national park)
- Official logo

- Location within Albania Location within Europe
- Location: Korçë County
- Nearest city: Korçë, Pustec
- Coordinates: 40°45′0″N 20°55′0″E
- Area: 27,613.05 hectares (276.1305 km^{2})
- Designated: 18 February 1999
- Governing body: National Agency of Protected Areas
- Website: prespanationalpark.gov.al

Ramsar Wetland
- Official name: Albanian Prespa Lakes
- Designated: 13 June 2013
- Reference no.: 2151

Prespa National Park (Albanian: Parku Kombëtar i Prespës) is a national park situated in southeastern Albania on the border triangle shared with Greece and North Macedonia. At approximately 277.5 km^{2} (107.1 sq mi), the park encompasses the country's sections of the Great and Small Prespa Lake. It is considerably characterised by high mountains, narrow islands, vast freshwater wetlands, salt marshes, meadows, reed beds and dense forests.

== History ==
Established to protect the natural and cultural heritage of the region, the park is included in the European Green Belt and the World Network of Biosphere Reserves under the UNESCO Man and Biosphere Programme. Albania's section of Great Prespa is recognised as a wetland of international importance by designation under the Ramsar Convention and further as an Important Bird and Plant Area.

Both lakes are essentially situated between 850 and 900 metres elevation above the Adriatic. Located about 150 metres above Lake Ohrid, their waters passes through several karst underground channels emerging from springs into the lake. Mali i Thatë separates the Great Prespa from Lake Ohrid, which is one of the most ancient lakes in the world. The mountain is primarily recognised for the cultivation of mountain tea that flourish at the limestone rocks of the mountain; it is one of the most popular tea types of the Albanian people. Otherwise, the park protects the island of Maligrad, which is dotted with many caves suitable for wildlife and a circular cliff.

Due to the temperature and climate differences between different areas and elevations of the park, it is characterized by housing a wide range of plants and animals. The park falls within the Pindus Mountains mixed forests terrestrial ecoregion of the Palearctic Mediterranean forests, woodlands, and scrub biome. Forests cover 13,500 hectares (135 km^{2}) of the park's area, with dense coniferous and deciduous forests. Out of the 1130 species of flora and 174 species of fungus are distributed throughout the park. The fauna is represented by 60 species of mammals, 270 species of birds, 23 species of reptiles, 11 species of amphibia and 23 species of fish.

Prespa National Park is a cultural landscape that displays evidence of cultural practices dating back thousands of years, with the oldest traces of human habitation dating back to the Neolithic. During classical antiquity, the trade route of Via Egnatia passed nearby the region as it was inhabited by several Illyrian and Ancient Greek tribes as well as Romans and later by Byzantines. Nonetheless, the park is dotted with many natural and cultural features containing prehistoric dwellings and Byzantine churches such as the caves of Zaver and Treni, the St. Mary's Church and so on.

== Geography ==
=== Location ===
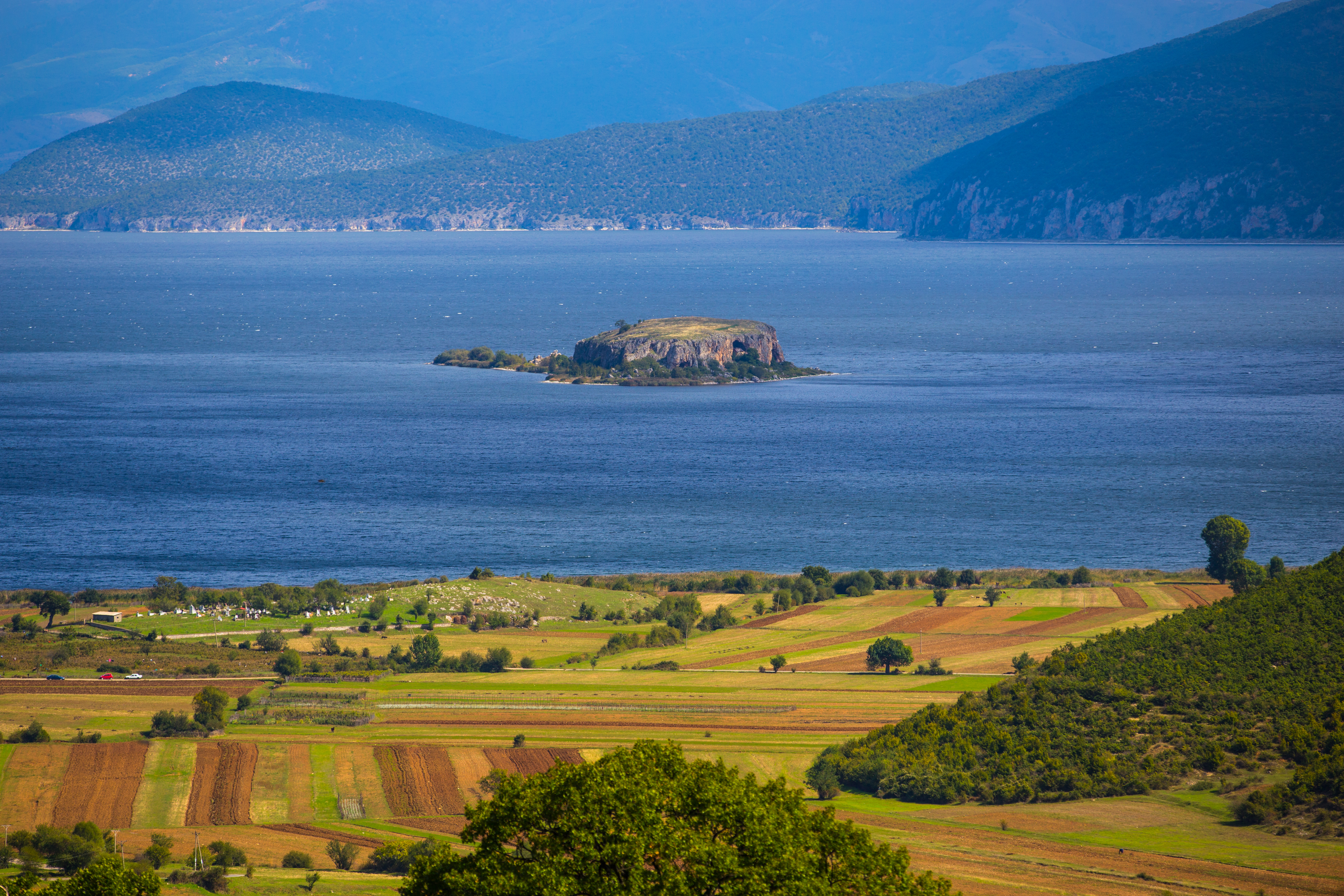
Island of Maligrad inside the Great Prespa Lake.

The Prespa National Park is strategically located in the southeastern region of Albania, bordering North Macedonia to the northeast and Greece to the southeast. It lies mostly between latitudes 40° and 45° N and longitudes 20° and 55° E. The park comprises 27,750 hectares (277.5 km^{2}) in Korçë County and includes the Great Prespa Lake, Small Prespa Lake, Maligrad Island and the surrounding regions. The city of Korçë is the nearest and largest city of the region. 2,100 hectares (21 km^{2}) of the park's territory is agricultural land, while 5,372 hectares (53.72 km^{2}) is classified as unproductive land. Forests occupy 13,500 hectares (135 km^{2}) of the total land area and only 1,828 hectares (18.28 km^{2}) is composed of pastures and meadows. The remainder is occupied by water bodies with 4,950 hectares (49.5 km^{2}).

The Great Prespa Lake is shared between Albania in the west, North Macedonia in the northeast and Greece to the southeast. Slightly to the south, the Small Prespa Lake extends between Albania and Greece and drains into the Great Prespa, which is separated through a narrow path from it. The lakes are situated between 849 and 853 metres elevation above the Adriatic, being the highest tectonic lakes in Southeastern Europe. The Great Prespa is primarily fed by underground tributaries and streams and emerge into the Lake Ohrid. The lakes are surrounded by high mountains including Mali i Thatë in Albania and Galičica in North Macedonia. Between the mountains in the west, there is a narrow outlet of which the lake drains during floods of heavy rainfall and in spring during the snow melt to the Devoll River, which flows through the central mountain range of Albania until it discharges into the Adriatic Sea on the Mediterranean Sea.

=== Climate ===
Under the Köppen climate classification, the climate of the park is generally mediterranean with continental influences. It is quite unique due to the diverse relief, variation in elevation and the position of the area associated to the lakes. Mean monthly temperature ranges between 0.2 °C (32.4 °F) in January and 19.2 °C (66.6 °F) in July. Rains mainly occur in late autumn and winter, while the least amount of rainfall is recorded in July and August. Mean annual precipitation ranges between 700 millimetres (28 inches) and 1,400 millimetres (55 inches) depending on region and climate type.

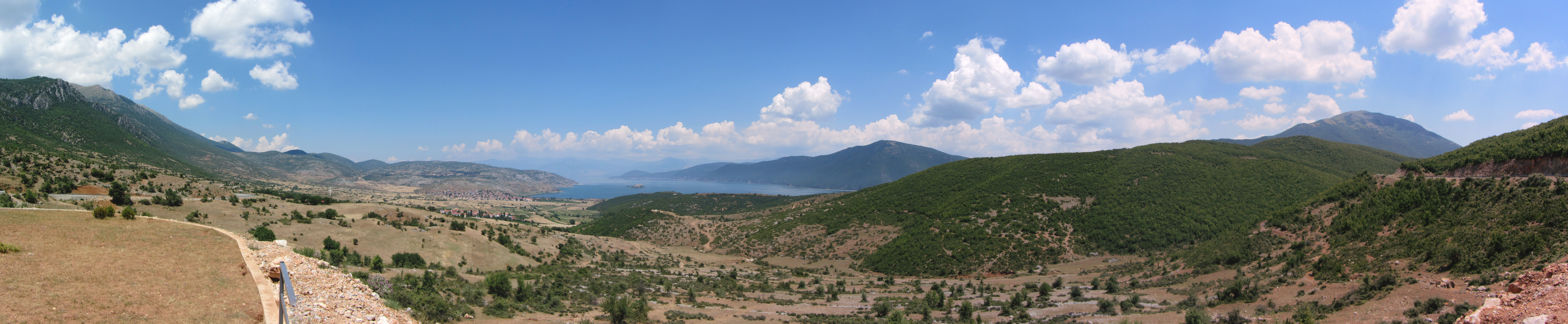
A panoramic view above the national park of Prespa during summer.

== Biodiversity ==
=== Habitats ===
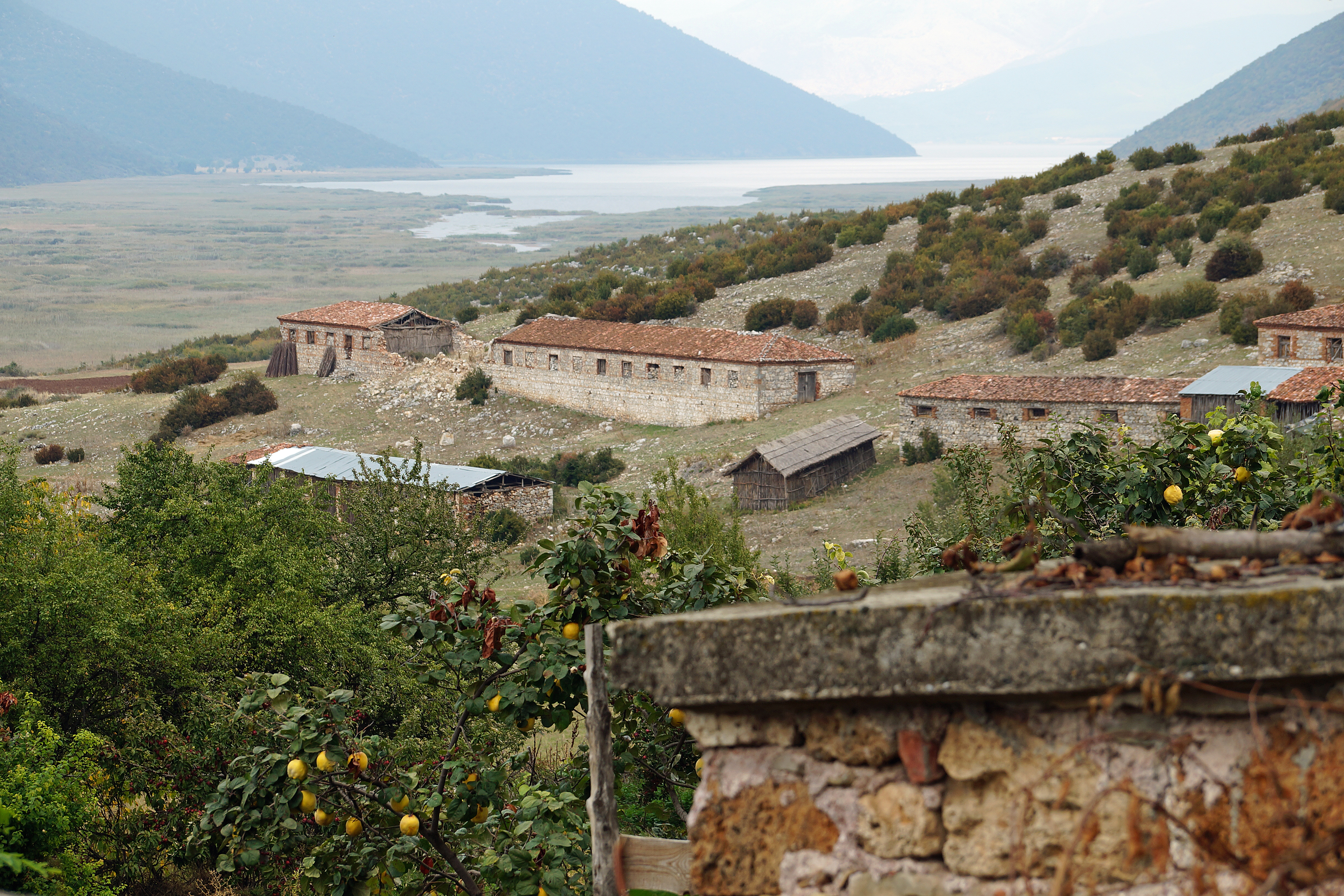
The village of Zagradec located at the Small Prespa Lake.

The park is a significant natural landscape comprising outstanding representation of connected ecosystems whose extent and intactness provides for a contrasting and rich biodiversity including naturally and culturally significant species. The park is a large and continuous natural environment that comprises several landscape types, each with marked natural and cultural values.

The reed beds occur along stream and river margins, where the flow is slower but are found most extensively on the lakes. They are of an exceptional value in terms of ecology. The country's sections of the lakes, covered by reed beds, are approximately about 500 ha in surface. They have great conservation value as they provide a good breeding and roosting site for a variety birds and other species.

The fresh water lakes of Great and Small Prespa within the park can be divided into several distinct zones of biological communities associated to the physical structure of the lakes. The pelagic zone covers the deep, mainly naturally, non-vegetated parts of the lakes, where emergent plants cannot grow. The littoral zone is the near shore area covering the vegetated parts comprising both terrestrial and emergent, tree or shrub, vegetation. The riverine zone encompasses some of the largest and most diverse stream and channel systems in the region, including extensive wetlands, floodplains and mangroves that support vast numbers of water birds and other aquatic and marine species.

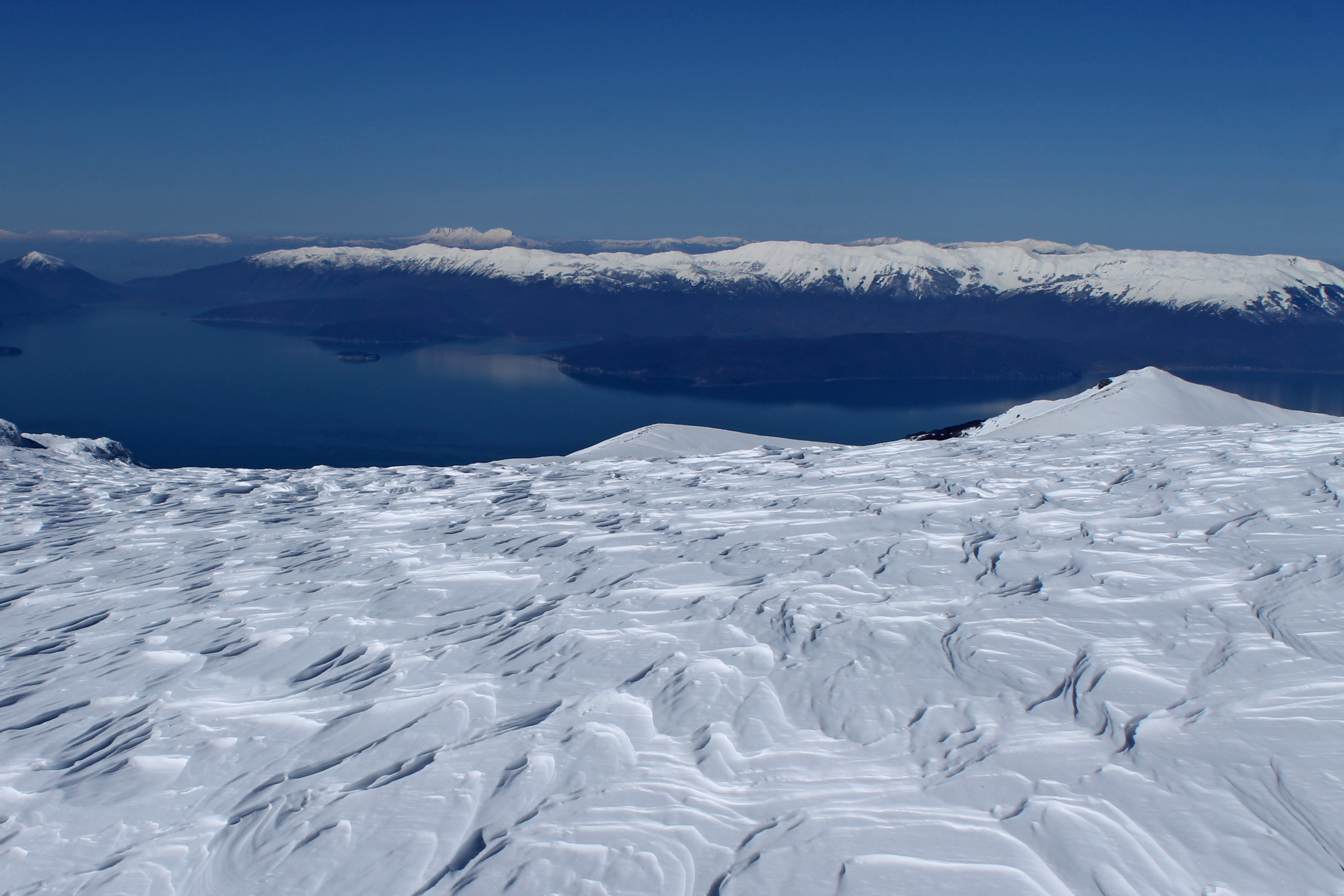
Albania's section of Great Prespa Lake as seen from North Macedonia.

The forest areas contribute a rich set of very different plant and animal species, to those otherwise found in the park, including threatened and endemic significant species. They differ in the predominant species of trees and other vegetation, and they also change with geological base, aspect and altitude. At a very coarse level, the forests can be considered as falling into several zones. The oak is one of the most common species of tree in the park, which in size and density represent a special feature in the park. This zone is overgrown with sessile, downy, Italian and austrian oak, while macedonian oak dominates on the dry and rocky slopes. As we climb from the hills to the mountainous areas, the oak forests change into beech spreading in the slopes of Mali i Thatë. This zone is predominantly abundant in European beech together with sycamore maple and turkish hazel. The extensive mixed forests zone of beech and fir are composed primarily of silver fir, bulgarian fir, European beech and balkan beech in the northeastern mountain areas.

Areas of grassland with alpine and sub-alpine meadows and pastures dominate much of the crests and eastern slopes of Mali i Thatë and provide an important habitat for the diverse wildlife that lives in abundance here. Although alpine tundra conditions also prevail, with grasses and small plants with a high level of endemism.

=== Wildlife ===
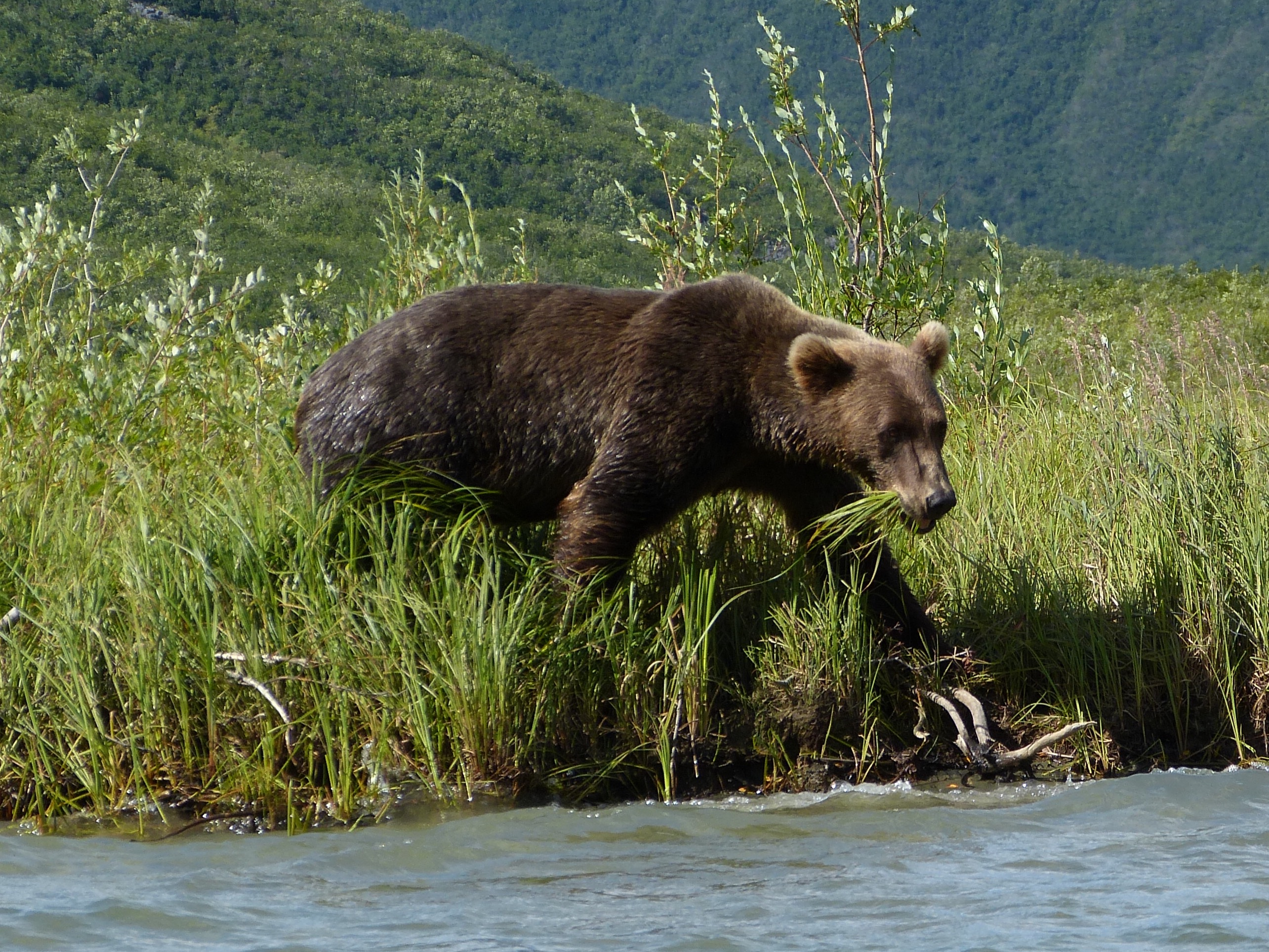
Perhaps the most important and iconic mammal species in the park is the brown bear.

The landscapes of the park have evolved, together with the floral and faunal resources, as part of the evolution of the Prespa Lake Basin some million years ago. The availability of water, influenced by the configuration of the terrain, has a great impact on the biodiversity of this region. The diversity of habitats in the park provides many different resources for several threatened and endangered species as well as species currently maintaining the conservation status of least concern.

In view of biogeography, the park falls within the pindus mountains mixed forests terrestrial ecoregion of the Palearctic mediterranean forests, woodlands, and scrub biome. The vegetation is mostly of Continental-Eurasian character with Mediterranean influences. The flora is represented by 1130 species of plants and 174 species of fungus distributed throughout the park's territory, while 60 species of plants are classified as rare and endangered.

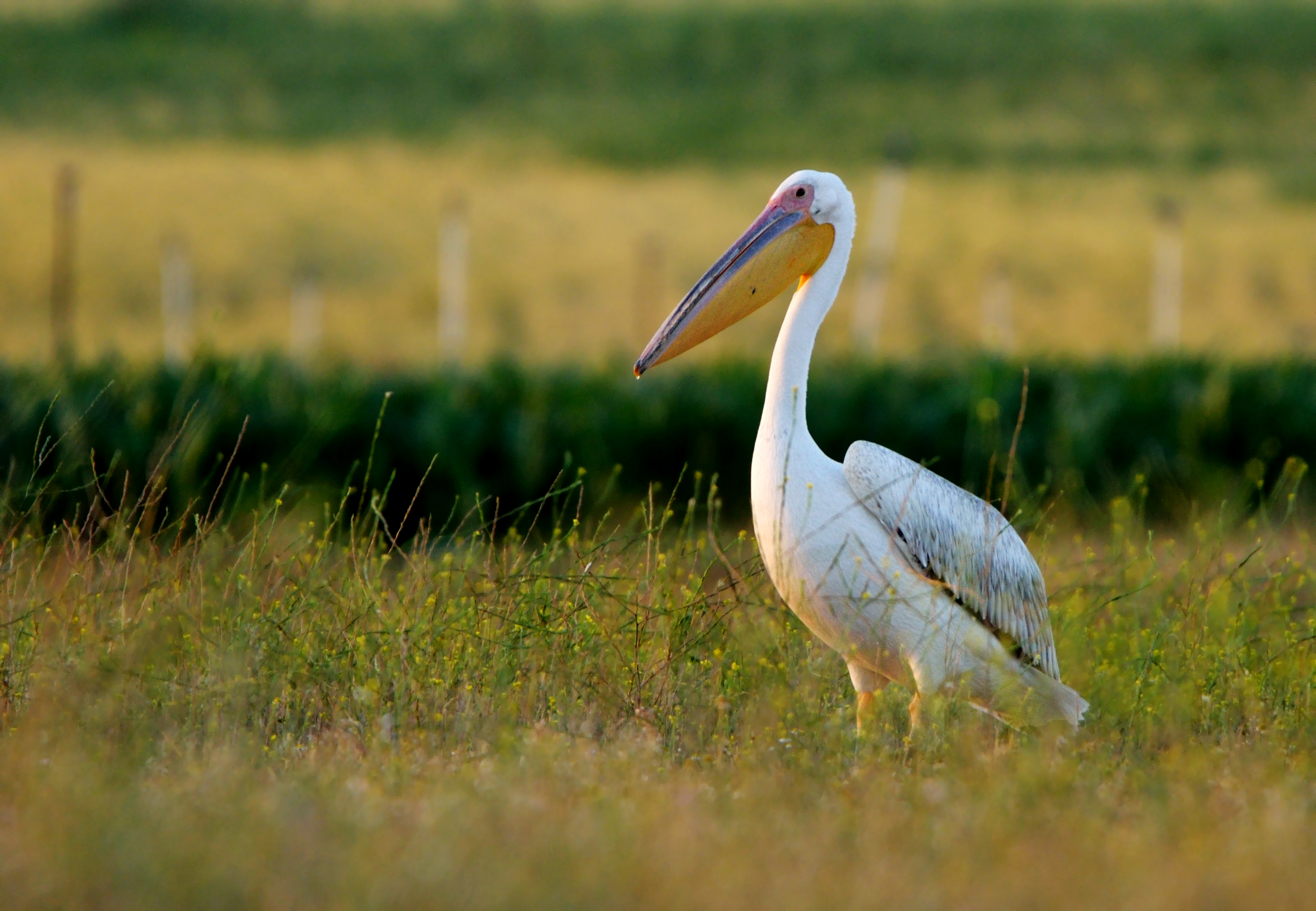
The great white pelican together with the dalmatian pelican inhabit the lakes during summer.

Due to the density of vegetation that makes some areas rather inaccessible to people, much of the preserved forests, bushes and grasses have remained relatively undisturbed by human intervention that in turn offers important shelter for animals. There are at least 60 mammal species known to occur in the park. It is one of the last areas in Europe, in which a great number of brown bears and gray wolves appears. The balkan lynx has never been observed, but it is generally considered that the park serves as an important ecological corridor, by reason of its contiguity to the Shebenik-Jabllanicë National Park. The red fox is relatively common and can be spotted quite frequently during winter in the park.

Classified as an Important Bird Area, however, birds are without question the park's most numerous class of animal with more than 270 species. Approximately 132 of the bird species utilising the park can be classified as breeding species and the remaining species are either resident or non-breeding visitors to the park. The white and dalmatian pelican, which is one of the largest bird species in the world, spend the summer season in the lakes of the park associated with the undisturbed wetlands, freshwater marshes and permanent streams.

Despite the unique geomorphology and the specific climate of the park, there are more than 25 species of bats to live in park's caverns. The cave of Treni is home to the largest and most important population of the long-fingered bat in Europe. The park is home to 23 species of reptiles and 11 species of amphibia including the european pond turtle, hermann's tortoise, spur-thighed tortoise, fire salamander, marsh frog and agile frog.

== Transboundary collaboration ==
The Prespa National Park in Albania became part of a planned tri-national, trans-boundary park headed by the Ramsar Convention in cooperation with the national parks of Prespa in Northern Macedonia and Greece in 2000. Although the three countries and the involved international parties have agreed for this common project since 2000, little progress has been made for its implementation and the three parks are effectively run as three different parks. Since then, another collaborative project in the framework of the Council of Europe has begun to be implemented: the "Prespa-Ohrid Ecoregion", which aims to unify all conservation projects of the wetlands of Lake Ohrid and the Prespa Lakes under one administration. Consequently, the Prespa-Ohrid Nature Trust was founded in 2015.

== See also ==
- Geography of Albania
- Protected areas of Albania
- Biodiversity of Albania
- Albanian Ohrid Lake Coast
