= Skanderbeg Mountains =

Mountain range in Albania

- Vargmalet Perëndimore
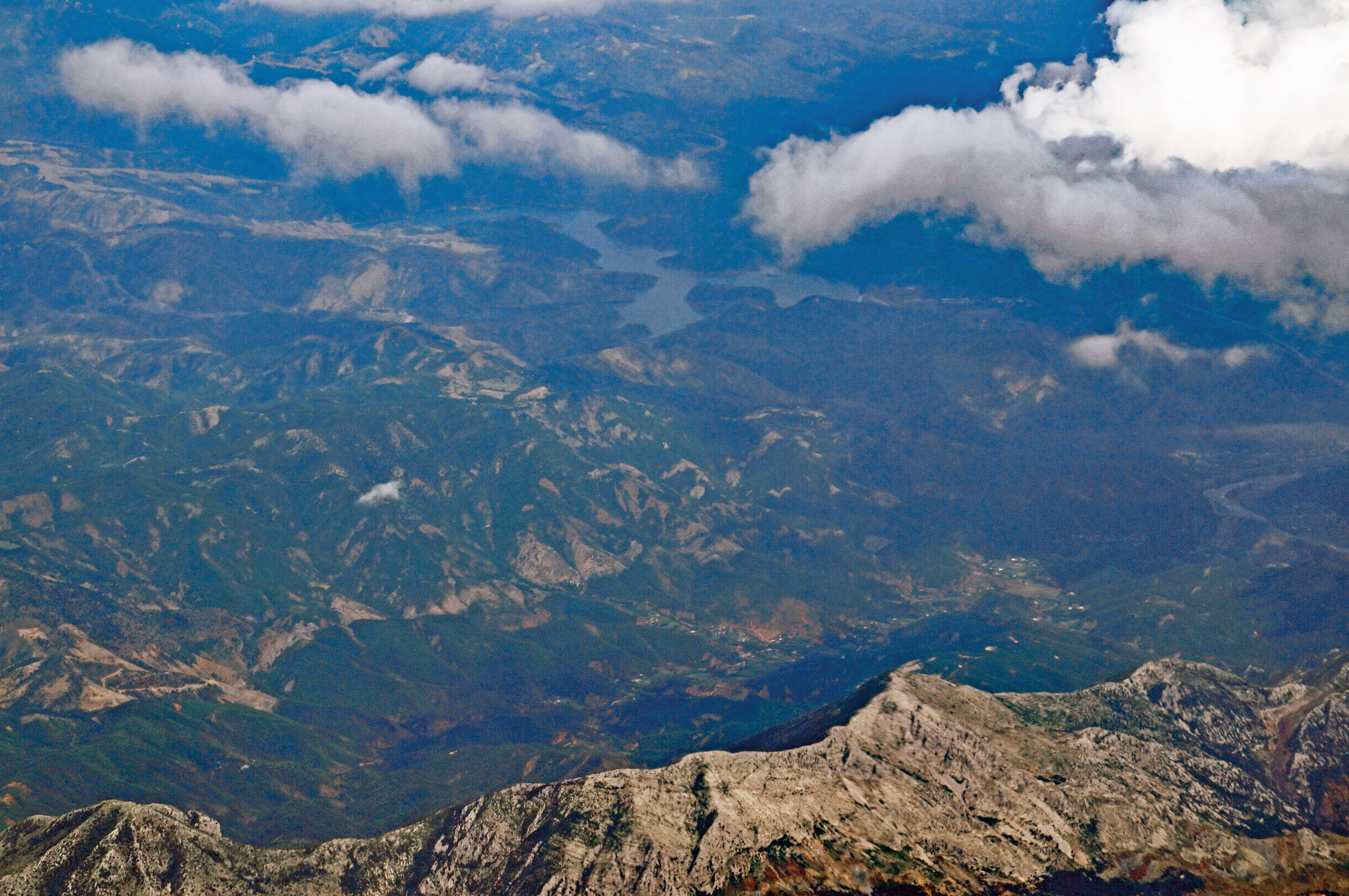
- View of Mali i Velës from the highlands of Mirditë

Highest point
- Elevation: 1,974 m (6,476 ft)
- Coordinates: 41°32′28″N 19°52′47″E

Dimensions
- Length: 100 km (62 mi)

Geography
- Location within Albania
- Country: Albania
- Region: Central Mountain Region

Geology
- Rock age(s): Triassic, Jurassic, Ordovician, Cretaceous, Paleogene
- Mountain type: mountain range
- Rock type(s): limestone, flysch

Skanderbeg Mountains (Albanian: Vargmalet e Skënderbeut), also known as Vargmalet Perëndimore, are a prominent mountain range situated in the northwestern section of the Central Mountain Region of Albania. The range stretches approximately 100 km (62 mi), making it the longest in the country. It extends from the Gjadër river valley in the northwest to the Shkumbin river valley in the southeast; and from the trough of Mat in the east, to the plains between Lezhë, Tirana and Lower Shkodër in the west.

The eastern side of the range is composed primarily of limestone from the Triassic-Jurassic periods, separated into distinct blocks, while the western side is composed of limestone from the Ordovician and the Cretaceous-Paleogene periods, forming belts amid the Paleogene flysch. Ultrabasic rocks are also present, and the older flysch appears in the form of surface bands on the eastern side of the range.

== See also ==
- List of mountains in Albania
