= Shebenik National Park =

Protected area in Albania

- Parku Kombëtar i Shebenikut
- IUCN category II (national park)
- Official logo

- Location within Albania Location within Europe
- Location: Elbasan County
- Nearest town: Librazhd, Prrenjas
- Coordinates: 41°10′0″N 20°30′0″E
- Area: 34,507.9 hectares (345.079 km^{2})
- Designated: 21 May 2008
- Governing body: National Agency of Protected Areas

Shebenik National Park (Albanian: Parku Kombëtar i Shebenikut) is a national park in eastern Albania adjacent to the border with North Macedonia. It encompasses 34,507.9 hectares (345.079 km^{2}) and is specifically marked by a mountainous landscape supplied with glacial lakes, valleys, dense coniferous and deciduous forests and alpine meadows and pastures. Elevations in the park vary from 300 metres to over 2,200 metres above the Adriatic at the peak of Shebenik and Jabllanica, hence the name. It dwells a number of endangered species that are fast becoming rare in Southern Europe, including the brown bear, gray wolf and Balkan lynx. The abundance in wildlife can in part be explained by the variety of vegetation types and remote location.

The park offers some of the most rugged scenery in the eastern section of country that were carved into their present shapes by the glaciers of the last ice age. It is home to 14 glacial lakes, the highest situated between 1,500 and 1,900 metres elevation above the Adriatic. Small cirque glaciers are fairly common in the mountain ranges, situated in depressions on the side of many mountains. Two rivers flow and multiple smaller water sources flow through the park's area including the rivers of Qarrishte and Bushtrice, both of which are 22 km long. The park area is thought to contain one of the primary remaining ranges of the Balkan lynx, a subspecies of the Eurasian lynx.

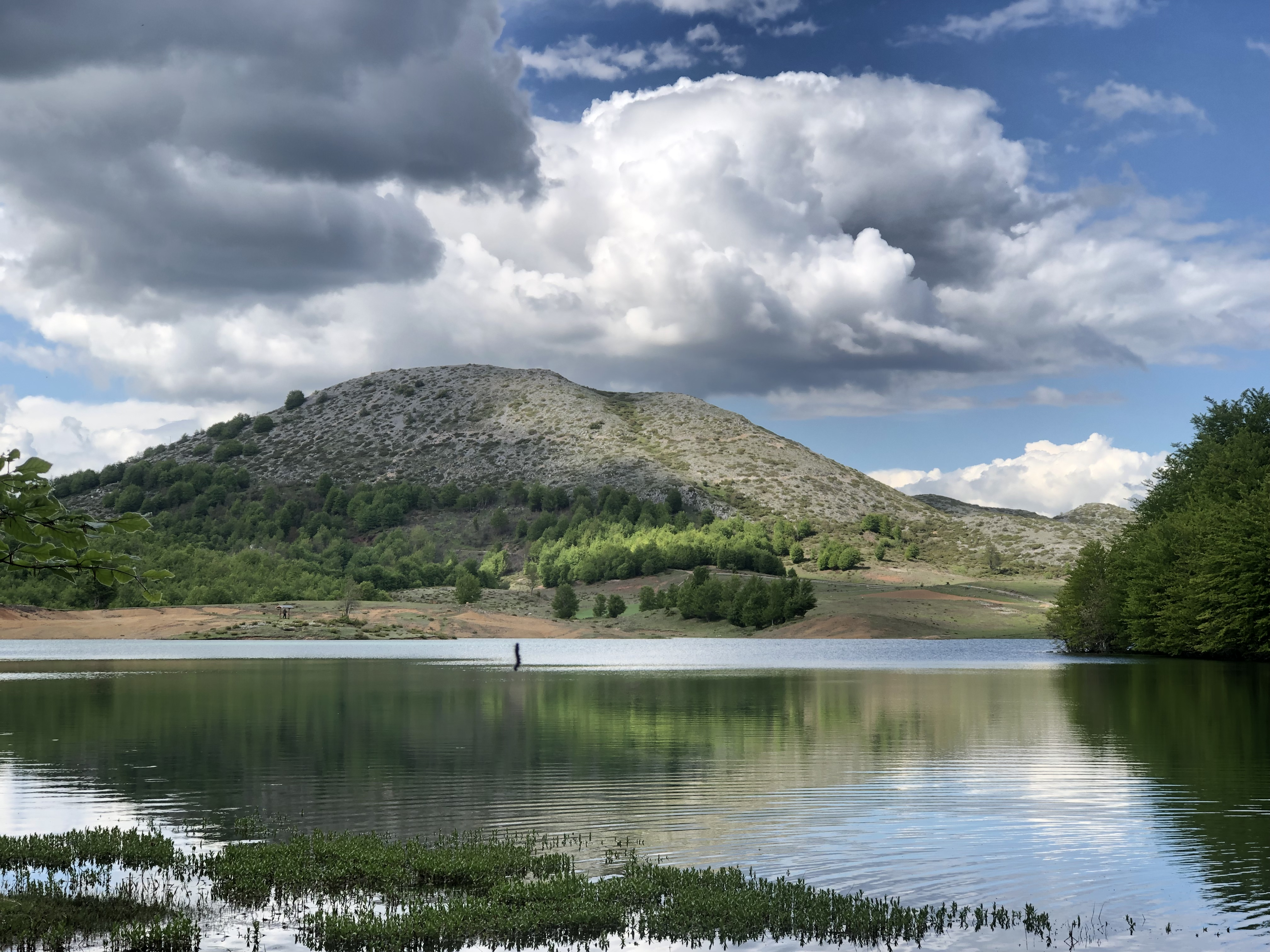
Lake of Fushë Studnë

The park falls within the Dinaric Mountains mixed forests terrestrial ecoregion of the Palearctic temperate broadleaf and mixed forest. The forests are home to a number of different rare and endemic species of plants, mammals and fungi. The park contains beech, fir, pines, and oak species as well as species such as purple willow, norway maple, silver birch, and silver fir in the northern slopes of the mountains. Bird species include the golden eagle, western capercaillie, and hazel grouse.

The park is managed by a directorate subordinated to the Ministry of Environment and based in the towns of Librazhd and Prrenjas. It is among the newest and the second largest national park in Albania. The International Union for Conservation of Nature (IUCN) has listed the park as Category II. It also includes the Rajca Nature Reserve. Roughly 212,945 hectares (2,129.45 km^{2}) of the park's territory are included within the Ancient and Primeval Beech Forests of the Carpathians and Other Regions of Europe, a UNESCO World Heritage Site. Notably, it is also part of the European Green Belt, which serves as a retreat for endangered animal and plant species. The mountains of Shebenik and Jablanica and the region of Rrajcë has been recognised as an Important Plant Areas of international importance by Plantlife.

== History ==
In January 2022, the national park was extended from 33,894.25 hectares (338.9425 km^{2}) to 34,507.9 hectares (345.079 km^{2}).

== Geography ==
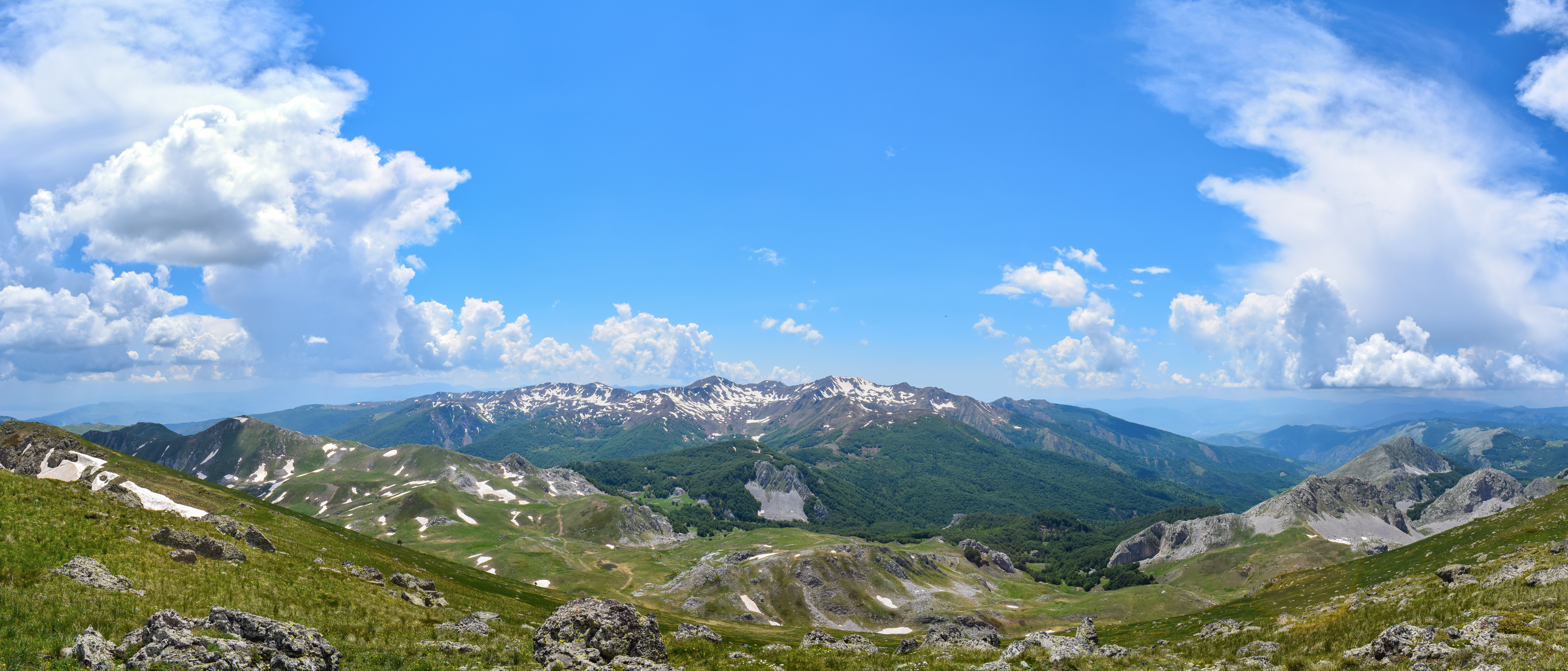
A panoramic view towards the park.

The Shebenik-Jabllanicë National Park is located in the north of the Lake Ohrid along the border between Albania and North Macedonia in the eastern part of the country. It lies mostly between latitudes 41° and 10° N and longitudes 20° and 30° E. The park covers 339.277 km^{2} (130.996 sq mi) in Elbasan County, forming an important section of the Southern European Green Belt due to its exceptionally valuable natural habitats, flora and fauna of international importance. The closest significant towns to the park are Librazhd and Prrenjas.

The park has a diverse and complex geologic history. The national park encompasses most of the connected mountain massifs of Shebenik and Jabllanicë. The area shows a record of deposition that spans from the middle part of the triassic and jurassic period. Formed during the variscan orogeny, the mountains are predominantly formed by ultramafic and metamorphic rocks. Nonetheless, calcareous rocks are among the most common types of rock and often found in the south and southeastern sections of Shebenik.

The bedrock of the park stretches above the forest belt, primarily made of carbon and karst, and dates from the formation of the mountain chain. The area is considerably dominated by mountains which were formed into their present shapes by the huge glaciers of the last ice age. Evidence of glacial action is found throughout the park visible in the form of u-shaped valleys, cirques and several bodies of water. Since the end of the ice ages, sediments deposited themselves on the bedrock, which explains why that region even today has extraordinary fertility.

Under the Köppen climate classification, the park experiences mostly a moderately warm and rainy continental climate under strong influences of the mediterranean climate. The climate is influenced by altitude with lower temperatures generally found at higher elevations. Mean annual precipitation ranges between 1,300 millimetres (51 inches) and 1,800 millimetres (71 inches) depending on geographic region and prevailing climate type inside the park.

== Biodiversity ==
=== Ecosystems ===
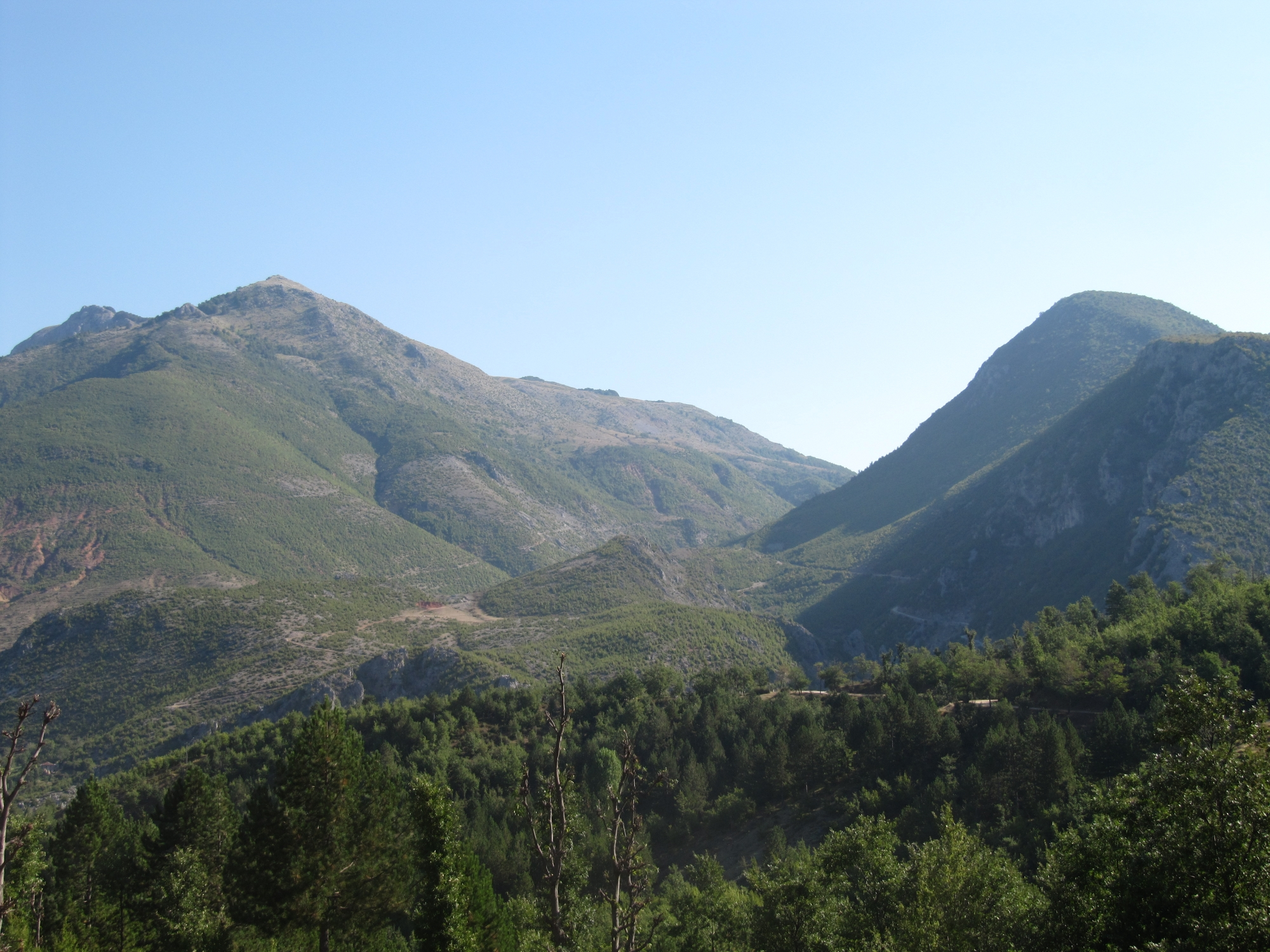
The beech forests of Rrajcë are part of the UNESCO Ancient and Primeval Beech Forests of the Carpathians and Albania.

The national park features contrasting and diverse ecosystems, determined mainly by topography, climate, hydrology and geology. Those factors vary as altitude increases and so create a variety of environments, where different plants grow together in communities, which in turn provide favorable habitats for a wide range of wildlife.

The montane ecosystem of the park offers a great diversity of landforms, together with an admirable plant and animal life, featuring meandering rivers, glacial lakes and vast meadows are surrounded by high mountains. The park has 14 glaciers and is dominated by mountainous terrain, which were carved into their present shapes by the glaciers of the last ice age, that were later filled by melt water and rain. They vary considerably in their size, shape and most notably in depth. They possess habitat for a restricted range of floral and faunal life, including shrubs, herbs, grasses, perennial and flowering plants.

The forest ecosystem make up large areas of the national park and extends to higher elevations and particularly along valleys, streams and rivers. These areas provide important habitat for susceptible species of birds and other animals. The national park possess coniferous, mixed, and deciduous forests, some of which quite ancient because of their inaccessibility. The forests of deciduous, principally of European beech, are in particular present in the entire territory of the national park. In these forests, conifer trees such as the European silver fir, Bosnian pine, and Macedonian pine are also to be found but beech is generally more abundant.

=== Fauna ===
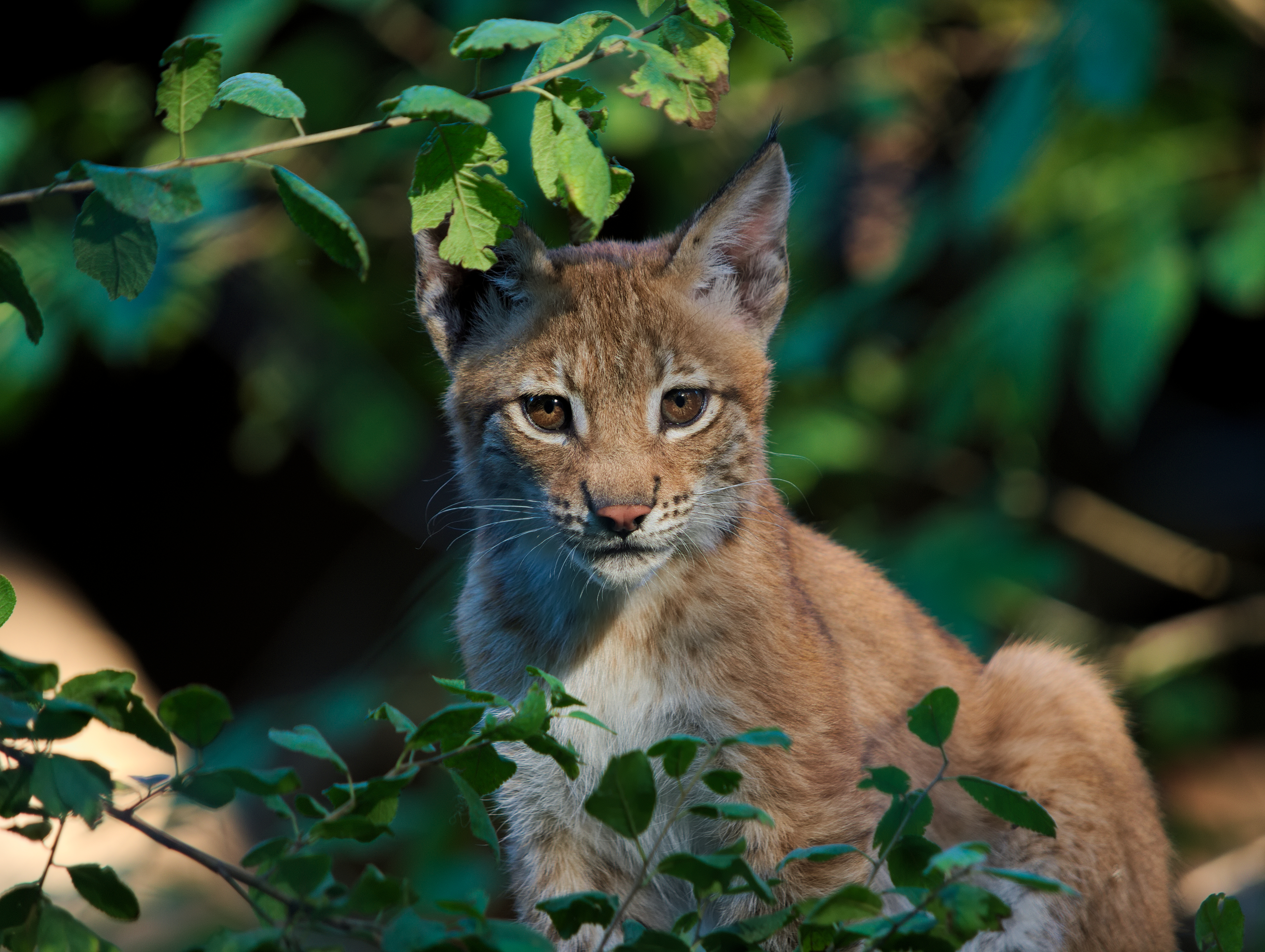
The Balkan lynx is a subspecies of the Eurasian lynx and is spread, although very rarely, across the park.

The fauna of the national park is varied and largely typical of the ecosystems of Southern Europe. The national park serves as an important ecological corridor for numerous species of animals that are present in the park and considered as endangered in both Albania and the Balkan Peninsula. The status of most species in the national park is unknown, due to incomplete or unavailable information.

There are approximately 30 mammal species found within the territory of the national park. Maybe the most iconic mammal of the national park is the critically endangered and extremely rare Balkan lynx. On 21 April 2011, the Protection and Preservation of Natural Environment of Albania research team got the first photo of an alive Balkan lynx living within the boundaries of the park. The red fox and gray wolf can be observed often around the park, alongside brown bears, although bears are less frequent. Another study has indicated that the red and roe deer, other very rare mammals in the country, also live in the park. It contains a variety of suitable habitats that support great populations of the least weasel, beech marten, stoat and the European badger as well. Though rarely seen, bats are represented with 18 species. The pastures, woodlands and scrublands are an important sanctuary of the greater horseshoe, lesser horseshoe and mediterranean horseshoe bat.

The national park is home to more than 88 different species of birds associated to the presence of characteristic species of both European and Mediterranean. Diverse birds range across different habitats, while the proximity of trees, especially beech and pines, affords them good nesting opportunities. The golden eagle is found in areas with rocky terrain and mountains, while short-toed snake eagle is found wherever there are large bodies of water. The peregrine falcon is both a resident and a visitor of the national park, and nests notably on cliffs and rocks.

There are 10 species of amphibians and 15 species of reptiles to be found in the national park. Some rare and endemic species includes the hermann's tortoise, blue-throated keeled lizard, smooth snake, black whipsnake and dice snake.

=== Flora ===
Phytogeographically, the park falls within the Dinaric Mountains mixed forests and Balkan mixed forests terrestrial ecoregions of the Palearctic temperate broadleaf and mixed forest. The flora of the park is of particular interest with many endemic species, exhibiting a variety of plants and habitats such as forests, shrubs, meadows and pastures. The dense forests, often clinging to steep valley sides and mountain slopes, comprise mostly beech, oak and occasionally silver fir, but also pines such as Bosnian pine and Macedonian pine. A large variety of shrubs, often dominated by manna ash, common hazel and cade juniper, make up a rich understory of the forest floor.

== See also ==
- Geography of Albania
- Protected areas of Albania
- Shebenik
- Jabllanica
- Central Mountain Region
