= Central Mountain Region (Albania) =

Geographical region of Albania

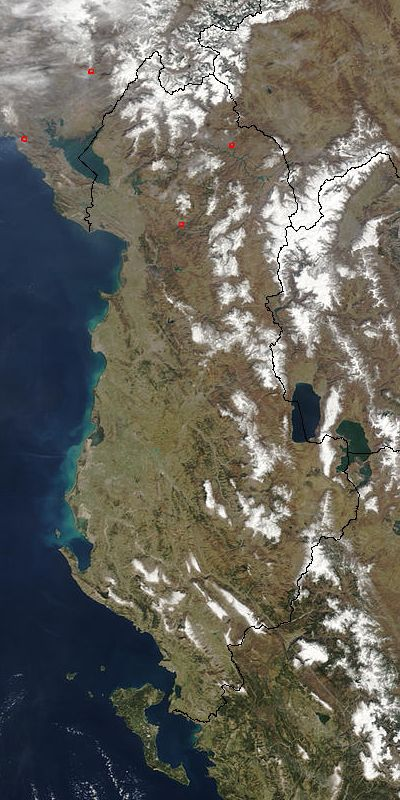
Topographical map of Albania

The Central Mountain Region (Albanian: Krahina Malore Qëndrore) is a physiogeographical region encompassing the central and eastern edge of Albania. It comprises the mountainous inland extending all the way from the valley of Drin and the mountains of Sharr, Skanderbeg, Korab, and Shebenik-Jabllanicë, through the lakes of Ohrid and Prespa, until it reaches the village of Ersekë and the mountains of Pindus close to the border between the country and Greece.

The central mountain range can be conventionally divided into a number of subregions. The north encompasses the mountainous districts of Mirditë and Pukë. The center is dominated by the mountains of Lurë and Korab alongside the regions of Martanesh and Çermenikë. The south includes the valley of Shkumbin as well as the mountains of Mokër and Valamara, the plain of Korçë with the upper districts of Devoll and Kolonjë.

The relief of the central mountain range is varied and supplied with high mountain passes, steep canyons and gorges, dense forests and alpine landscapes dotted with glacial lakes, which in turn provide excellent conditions for a great biodiversity. Most of the terrain was formed by ultramafic rocks, originating from the Earth's mantle, which has become largely serpentinite.

The protected areas of the region are home to some of the most iconic views and landscapes of the country. There are six national parks, a ramsar site, a biosphere reserve and a World Heritage Site located in the region. Likely the largest protected areas, measured by area, are the Korab-Koritnik Nature Park and Shebenik-Jabllanicë National Park.

== Geology ==
=== Korab Mountains ===
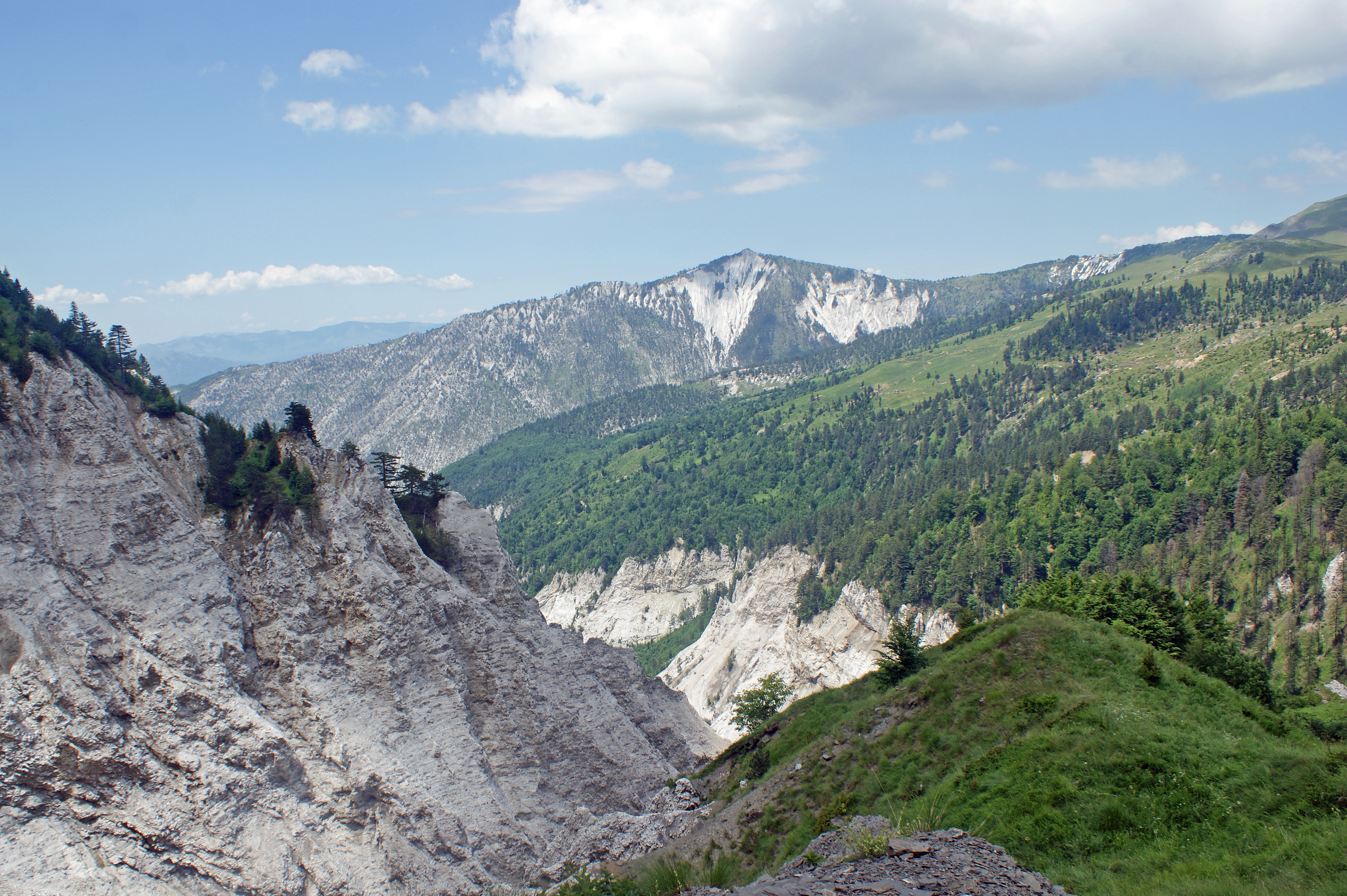
Mali i Bardhë, typical karstic landscape inside the Korab mountains.

The Korab Mountains are the highest and longest mountain range within the central mountain range. The relief is varied and endowed with many glacial lakes, mountain passes, canyons, gorges and depressions. It extend some 40 kilometres (25 mi) from the north to the south between the lower section of the Black Drin and its tributary Radika. The mountain range are largely composed Paleozoic sedimentary rocks of dolomite, limestone, sand and conglomerates.

The Korab massif is the fourth highest peak in the Balkans, the highest peak of Albania and North Macedonia and also one of only two summits in Europe, which are the highest point for more than one country. Furthermore, Korab is the 18th most prominent mountain summit in the Europe. Other peaks include Maja e Moravës 2,718 m (8,917 ft), Mali i Gramës 2,345 m (7,694 ft) Korab II 2,756 m (9,042 ft), Korab III 2,724 m (8,937 ft), Korab Gates 2,727 m (8,947 ft), Maja e Moravës 2,718 m (8,917 ft), Shulani i Radomirës 2,716 m (8,911 ft) and Small Korab 2,683 m (8,802 ft). Korab encompasses 562 square kilometres (217 sq mi), 63.5% within the Albanian territory. The Albanian part of the mountain range is a protected nature park.

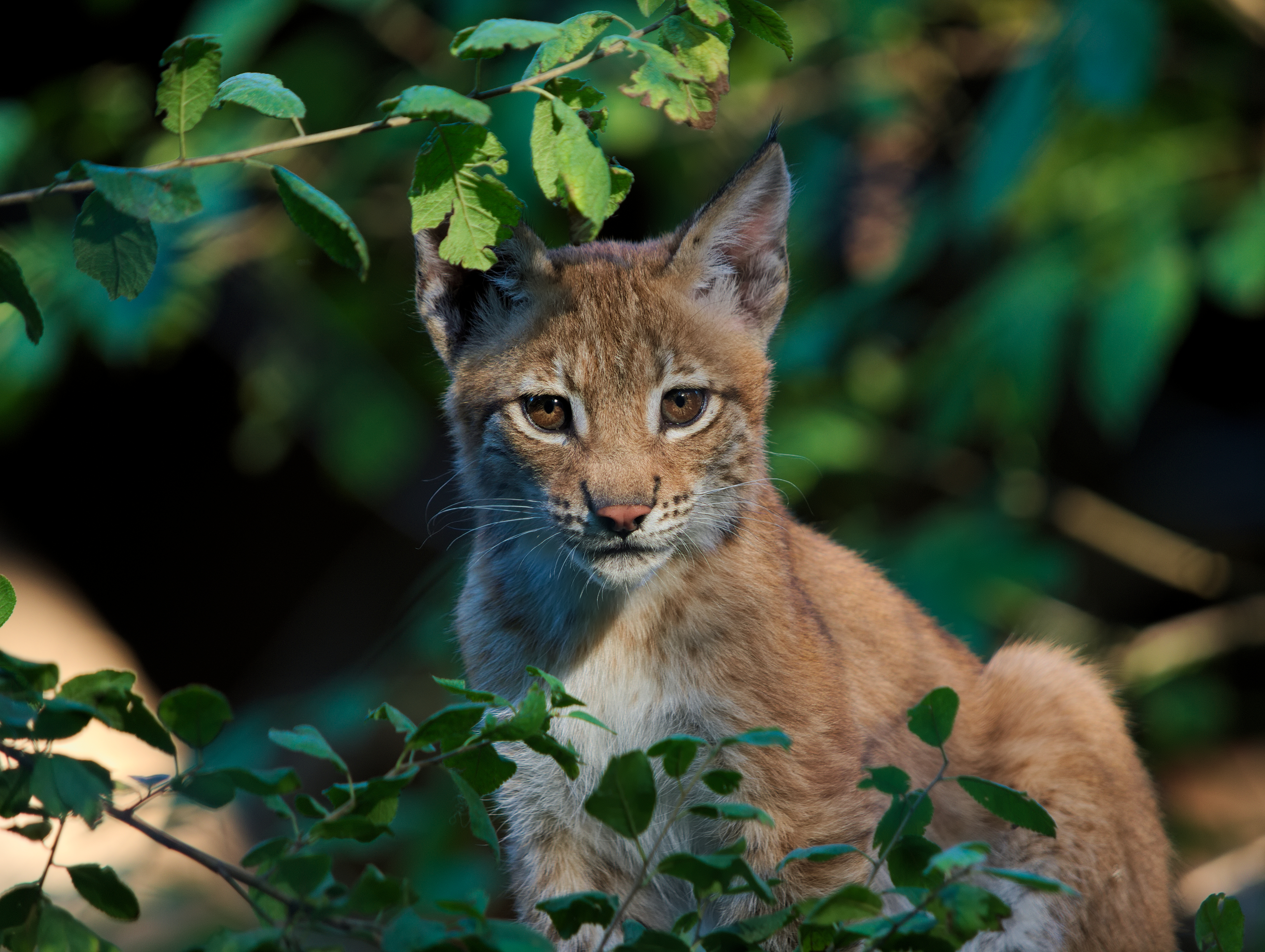
The Eurasian lynx can be found in the central range.

Korab is renowned for its 39 glacial lakes located between 2,340 metres elevation above the Adriatic, the largest and the deepest of them being Gramë. The forests are composed of diverse species of deciduous and coniferous trees and a variety of wildflowers. They are abundant in species such as beech, austrian pine, silver fir, bosnian pine, macedonian pine, and black alder. The fauna is represented of numerous species of large mammals such as brown bears, wolves, lynxes, golden eagles, goshawks, and many others.

=== Jabllanicë and Shebenik Mountains ===
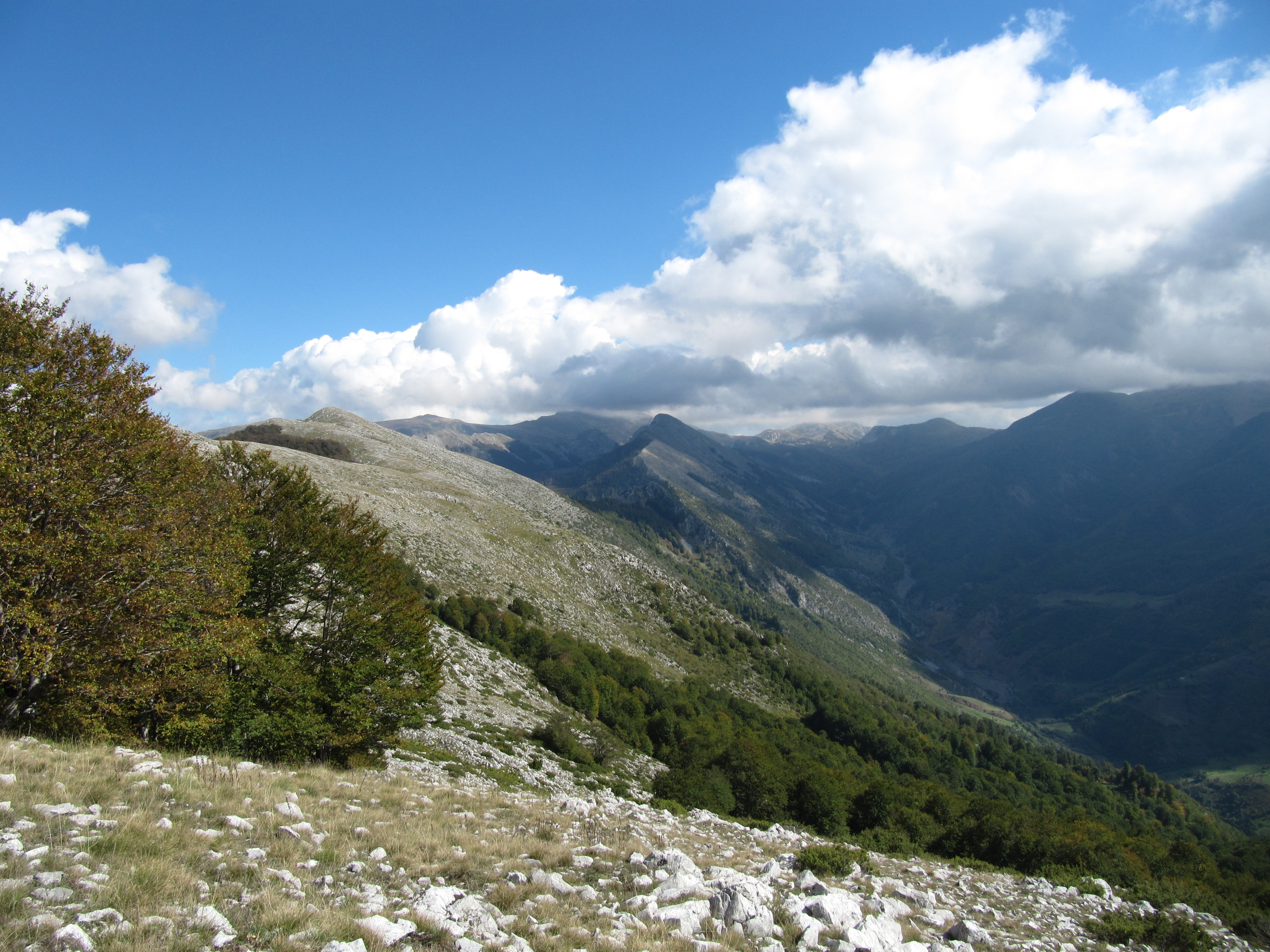
Jabllanicë mountain in Albania near Qarrishte.

The Jabllanicë Mountains (Albanian: Jabllanicë) lies on the western part of the Balkan Peninsula, with over 50% of its area in Albania and the remaining in North Macedonia. It runs 50 kilometres (31 mi) from the Ohrid Lake on the border between Albania and North Macedonia in north–south direction through the boundary of both countries to the city of Debar next to the Debar Lake. In the east, the mountains falls down into the valleys of the Black Drin and the Ohrid Lake. In the west, the Shebenik mountains are located, which reaches nearly an equal height as the Jabllanica mountain range. Within the Shebenik mountains, there are around nine small glacial lakes with Rajca Lake being the largest with a length of 220 metres (720 ft) and a width of 160 kilometres (99 mi). It is located on the eastern slopes and the most southern lake on Shebenik. Maja e Shebenikut is the highest peak at 2,251 metres (7,385 ft) above the Adriatic.

The mountains are the source of the name of the Shebenik-Jabllanice National Park. Large areas are covered with beech, oak, and conifer forests. Due to its natural heritage and remarkable flora and fauna, the Shebenik-Jabllanice National Park forms a part of the Primeval beech forests of the Carpathians and other regions of Europe, that was declared a UNESCO World Heritage Site in 2017. Most of Europe's large mammals inhabit the area such as the brown bear, wolf, boar, chamois and deer. Furthermore, the endangered Balkan lynx still survives in the mountains.

=== Valamara Mountains ===
Panoramic view from the Maja e Valamarës (Mount Valamara).

The Valamara Mountains lies between the Shkumbin valley in the north and Devoll valley in the south. Moreover, the Shkumbin river originates in the mountains. The mountains are situated on the territory of three districts such as Gramsh, Pogradec and Korçë. The summit of the Valamara range in southwestern Albania, Maja e Valamarës is the highest peak with an elevation 2,373 metres (7,785 ft). They are formed of Mesozoic and Paleozoic sedimentary rocks of dolomite, limestone, sand and conglomerates formed by seas and lakes that had once covered the area. In addition to that, several glacial lakes can be found on the eastern part. The total length of the Valamarians is over 13 km (8 mi) and the mountain chain's width varies between 10 and 15 km (6 and 9 mi). The highest altitudes occur where they are widest.

=== Skanderbeg Mountains ===
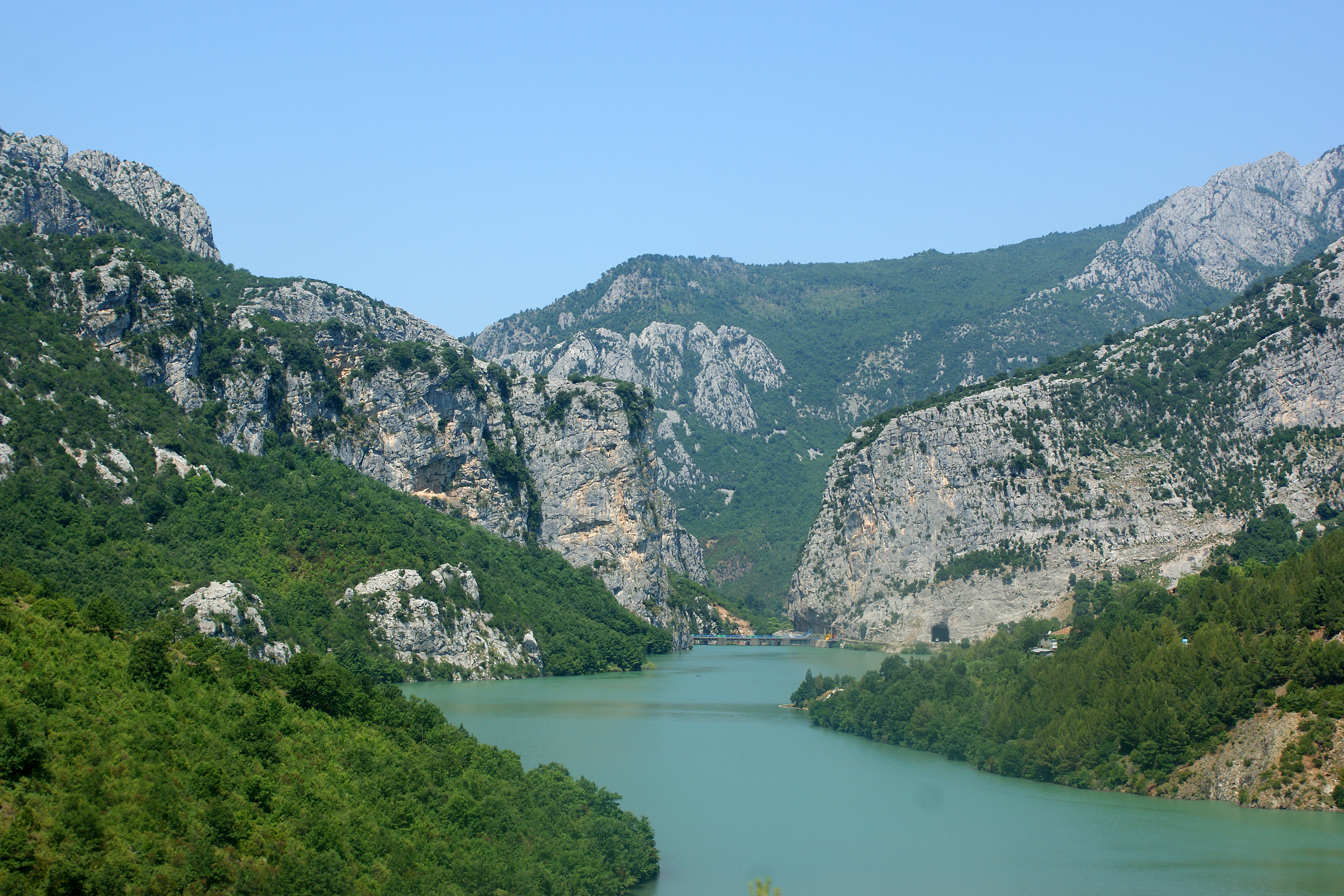
Shkopet Gorge, the Mat river flowing through the gorge.

The Skanderbeg Mountains (Albanian: Vargmalet e Skënderbeut) forms the border between the Central Mountain Range and Western Lowlands in the west. Although the range curves a lot, its main direction is from the north to south, extending about 80 kilometres (50 mi) in north–south direction from Vau i Dejës in the north to the city of Elbasan in the south. In the west, the mountains fall steeply into the coastal plain, running along the Adriatic Sea. In the east, it is characterized by highlands and the Mat river basin; to the north the Mirditë and to the south the mountains of Martanesh. It was formed by strong tectonic uplifts and folds during the Triassic, Jurassic and Cretaceous periods. The peaks are composed of limestone, while the slopes of flysch.

The northern section south of Vau i Dejës, the mountains reaches an altitude of 614 metres (2,014 ft) elevation above the Adriatic in Maja e Shitës. Some kilometres, the peaks gradually become higher at Mali i Velës standing at 1,172 metres (3,845 ft), in the northeast of Lezhë. The mountains have abundant water reserves with a dense network of mountain springs and rivers. The 94 kilometres (58 mi) long Fan river flows from Mirdita and crosses the mountains south of Mali i Velës through narrow gorges and canyons into the Mat river. The western section, or Kruja Chain, is an anticline structure composed of carbonate core from the Cretaceous-Eocene period. It begins at the confluence of the rivers of Fan and Mat, rising quickly than the eastern section. At Mali i Krujës, it starts reaching an elevation of more than thousand, to be precise 1,176 metres (3,858 ft). On its western slopes the city of Krujë is located. However, it continues to rise further south of Krujë towards Tirana at Dajti Mountains with deep canyons and gorges, which cuts the mountains into a long series of blocks. The highest peak is Dajti with 1,613 metres (5,292 ft). Afterwards, the Mali i Priskës 1,365 metres (4,478 ft) and a series of mountains under 900 metres (3,000 ft) above the Adriatic follows.

== Hydrology ==
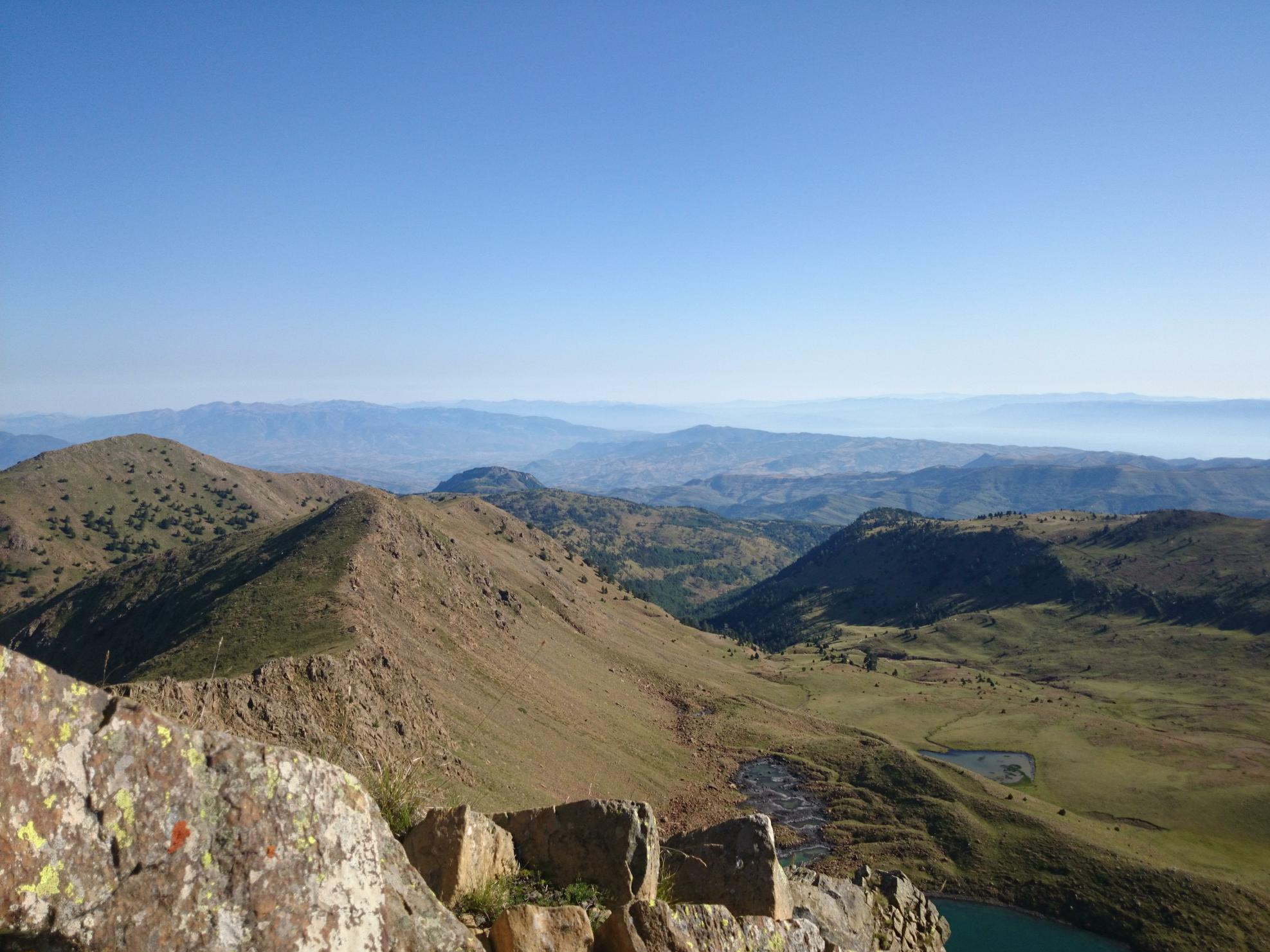
Source of the Shkumbin river on the Valamara peak.

The hydrography of the central mountain range is dominated by glacial lakes and a dense network of streams that temporary flow in periods of snow or rain melt. With a total length of 285 km (177 mi), the Drin river is the longest and largest in the region. As the river flows through the karstic regions of the mountains and hills, its banks are steep with cliffs and precipices. The region belongs mainly to the Drin river basin. It drains nearly the entire central mountain range and most of the higher lands to the northeast and southeast. The Black Drin (Drini i Zi) originates from the Lake Ohrid in southeastern Albania between the border with North Macedonia and flow 149 kilometres (93 mi) northwards through the Shebenik-Jabllanica and Korab mountains towards to the outskirts of Kukës in the northeast of Albania, where the Black Drin merges with the White Drin (Drini i Bardhë). In addition to that, the Drin river starts at the confluence of its two headwaters until the river discharges the Adriatic Sea. Most of these streams falls swiftly from the mountains in the east towards the Adriatic coast and have cut deep, scenic gorges. The White Drin drains 4,964 square kilometres (1,917 sq mi) of the karstic landscapes of eastern Albania, while the Black Drin drains 5,885 square kilometres (2,272 sq mi).

In the southeast, the Shkumbin river flows out of the eastern part of the Valamara Mountains through the Gora Mountains and flows into the Adriatic Sea as well. In the upper flow of the Shkumbin basin, the river passes through the limestone hills of Valamara and sedimentary rocks represented by cemented sands and conglomerates. There are also the Albanian parts of freshwater lakes Ohrid, Prespa and Small Prespa.

== Biology ==
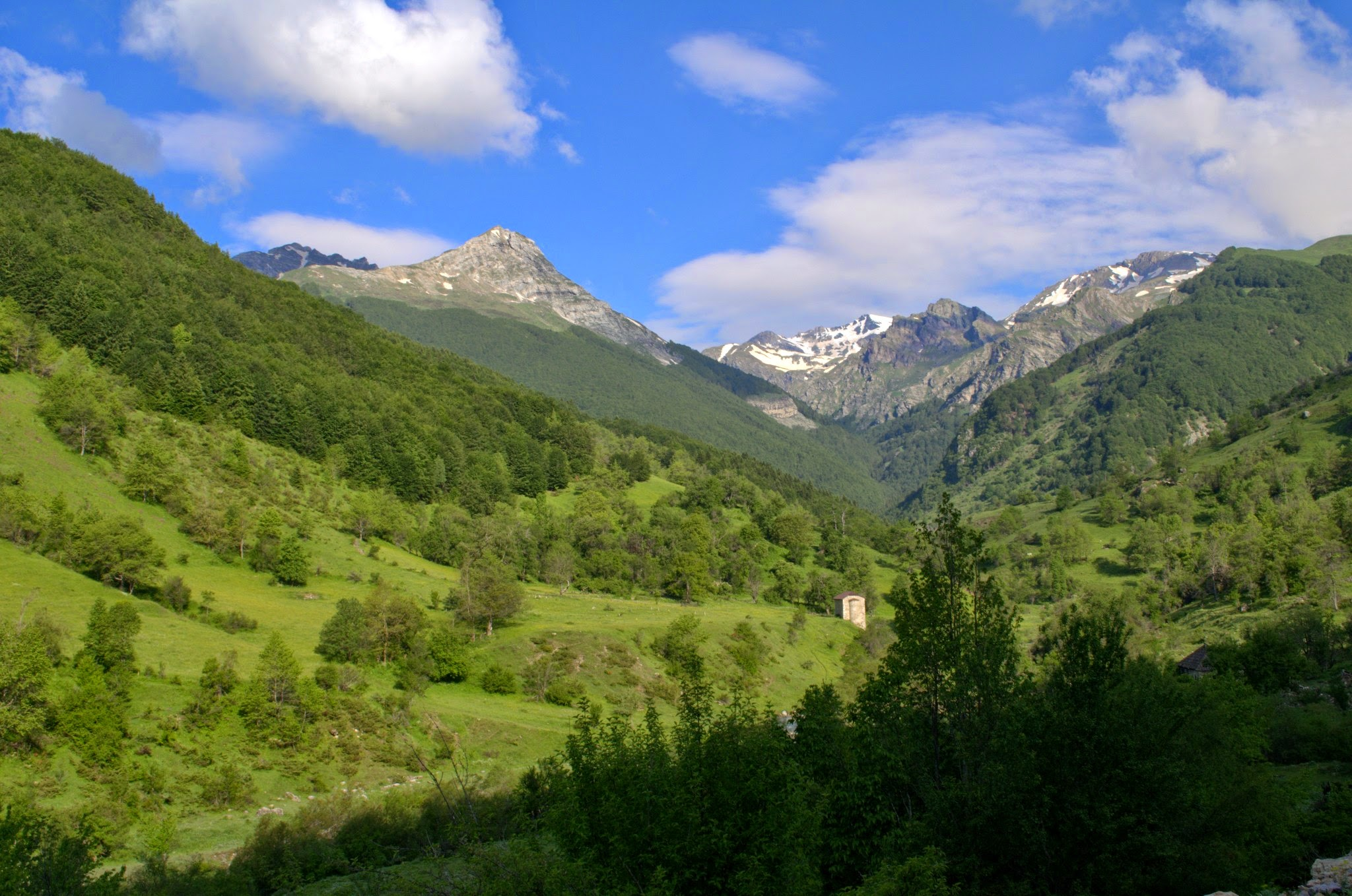
A typical habitat in the Korab mountains.

=== Flora ===
The central mountain range contains extraordinary biological diversity and a vast array of ecosystems. In terms of phytogeography, the central mountain range falls within the Dinaric Mountains mixed forests, Balkan mixed forests and Pindus Mountains mixed forests terrestrial ecoregions of the Palearctic temperate broadleaf and mixed forest and Mediterranean forests, woodlands, and scrub biomes, respectively.

The forests are composed of different species of deciduous and coniferous trees including a great variety of plants of european and mediterranean type. Of particular importance is the presence of the fir; 74 percent of the entire forests composed with fir in Albania can be largely found in the central mountain range. In some cases, it forms mixed forests with beech (European beech), pine (black pine), and oak (european oak). Outstanding is the black pine which grows mainly in the northern region of the central mountain range such as in Mali i Bardhë.

=== Fauna ===
The fauna is poorly studied, but within the Albanian Korab mountains it is represented by 37 species of mammals, among which are included the brown bear, grey wolf, balkan lynx, roe deer, wild boar, weasel, pine marten, and red squirrel.

The central mountain range provide exceptional watching opportunities for bird species, that are threatened in the country, throughout the year. The golden eagle and peregrine falcon nest in rocky and forested areas adjacent to bodies of water, staying away from heavily human activity when possible such as in Korab-Koritnik Nature Park. The western capercaillie lives predominantly in the conifer forests in old rocky areas throughout the region. The griffon vulture is outstandingly rare and breeds on cliffs associated with the rugged and mountainous area. The white and dalmatian pelican, which is one of the largest bird species in the world, spend the summer season in the lakes of the Prespa National Park associated with the undisturbed wetlands, freshwater marshes and permanent streams.

The area of Shebenik and Jabllanicë is home to the endangered Balkan lynx that lives at the deciduous and mixed forests of the mountains. It is also the southernmost point of their European habitat.

== See also ==
- Korab-Koritnik Nature Park
- Mali me Gropa-Bizë-Martanesh Nature Park
- Ohrid-Prespa Biosphere Reserve
- Prespa Ramsar Site
- Rajcë Nature Reserve
- Rajcë part of Primeval beech forests of the Carpathians and other regions of Europe
- Shebenik National Park
- Lurë-Dejë Mountain National Park
