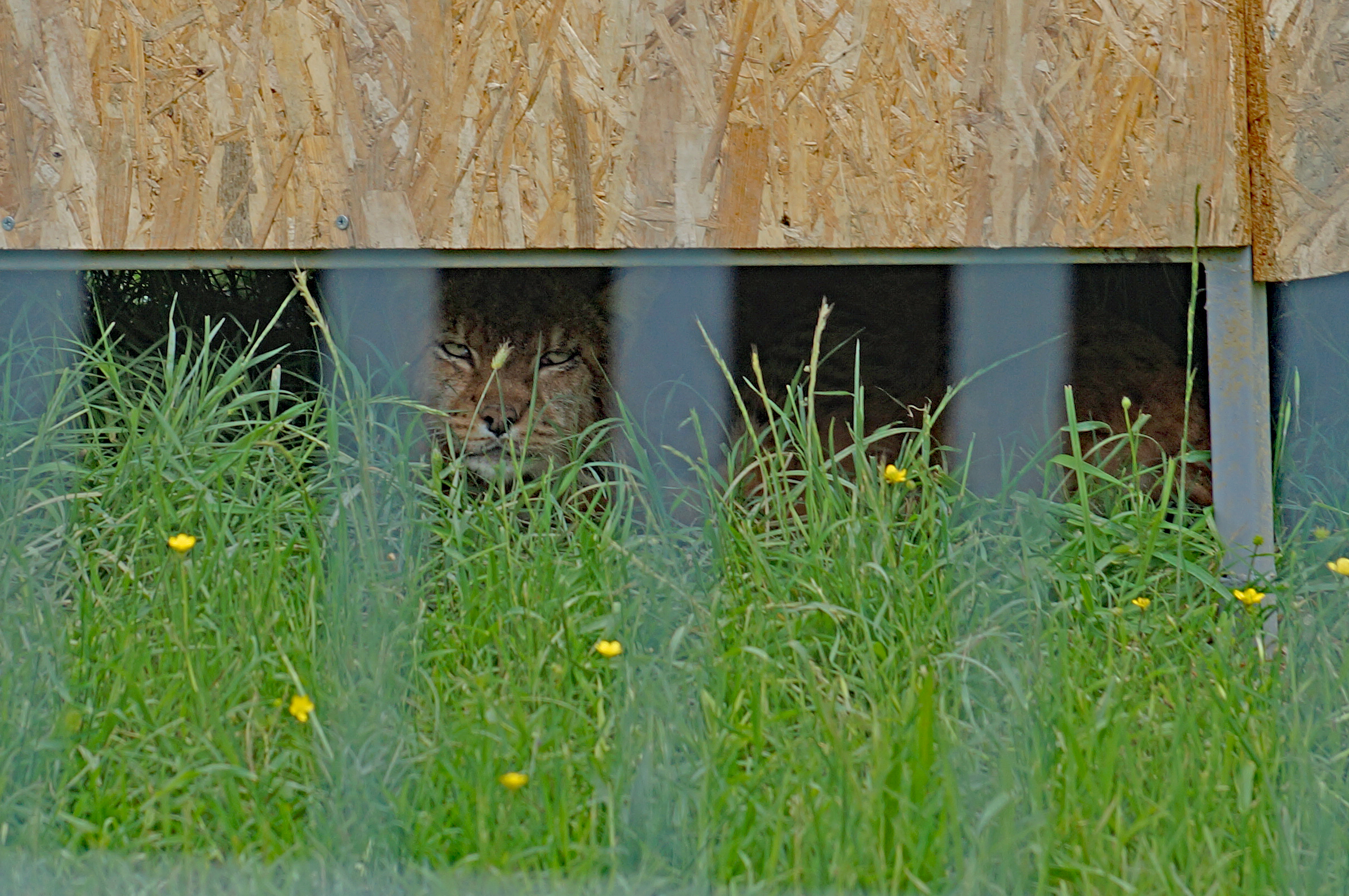
- A Balkan lynx in the Zoopark Tirana, Albania

Conservation status
- Critically Endangered (IUCN 3.1)

Scientific classification
- Kingdom: Animalia
- Phylum: Chordata
- Class: Mammalia
- Order: Carnivora
- Family: Felidae
- Genus: Lynx
- Species: L. lynx
- Subspecies: L. l. balcanicus

Trinomial name
- Lynx lynx balcanicus Bures, 1941

Synonyms
- Lynx lynx martinoi (Miric, 1978)

= Balkan lynx =

Subspecies of lynx native to Europe and Asia

The Balkan lynx (Lynx lynx balcanicus) is a subspecies of the Eurasian lynx in the genus Lynx. It is found in Bosnia, Albania, Kosovo and western North Macedonia, with smaller populations in Montenegro. It is considered a national symbol in North Macedonia and appears on the 5-denar coin.

It is believed that in North Macedonia there are from 35 to 40 remaining Balkan lynx, mostly found in Mavrovo National Park. This cat is considered to be the largest cat in the Balkans. It has been sighted in 2011 and 2012 in the northern mountainous region of Albania and within the boundaries of the Shebenik-Jabllanice National Park. The lynx is classified as Critically Endangered in Albania and has been protected de jure since 1969 but, despite this, poaching and habitat destruction threatens the remaining Balkan lynx populations in both Albania and North Macedonia. There are an estimated 15-20 individuals still alive in Albania. The Balkan lynx has been on the brink of extinction for nearly a century, with total numbers estimated to be fewer than 50.

The Balkan lynxes' decrease in number have been thought to be due to illegal poaching. The Balkan lynx starts mating around January to February, and gives birth in April. While the Balkan lynx is listed as a subspecies in much of the news coverage and taxonomic references, there has been some dispute over those claims.

== Habitat and population ==
The Balkan lynx is found in the southwestern Balkans; in Bosnia, Albania, Kosovo, North Macedonia, and potentially Serbia, Montenegro, and Greece. This is home to a critically endangered population of the Balkan lynx, with an estimated population of 30 adult individuals over 5000 km^{2}. They have been recovering since approximately 1935-1940, when only 15-20 lynxes were estimated to be alive. They seemed to recover after World War II, with the population doing somewhat better around the mid-1970s, when it was estimated to be around 280 lynxes (in 1974). After this, the numbers seemed to drop dramatically, to 90 lynxes, in the year 2000. They live in deciduous forests, evergreen forests, mixed forests, and bush habitats. They do not migrate, but occasionally hunt in shrubland, cultivated areas, and high-mountain pastures during the summer. They primarily hunt roe deer, young chamois, and European hare. The Balkan lynx is categorized as critically endangered due to its low population. They are split into two sub-populations, one in Mavrovo National Park and one in Shebenik-Jabllanice National Park.

== Mating ==
Mating season is from February to mid-April. Oestrus lasts for three days. Male and female often feed together during this time.

Litters can be anywhere from one to five kittens, with an average of two to three kittens. A newborn lynx weighs about 300 grams. At three months, kittens begin following the mother out of the rock cave den to eat meat from her kills. At ten months, usually around March or April, kittens leave their mothers to be independent.

== Behavior ==
Lynx live mostly independent lives except for mating and raising cubs. Lynxes occupy territories marked with special gland secretions, urine, or feces. Males have larger territories to have access to one or two females. Males are thought to have territories around 180–2,780 km^{2} (69–1,073 sq mi). Females are thought to have territories around 98–759 km^{2} (38–293 sq mi). Mothers and daughters sometimes have greatly overlapping territories.

Lynxes are active during the evening and night and sleep during the day.

The Lynx genus usually hunts lagomorphs, or hares, pikas and rabbits. However, the Eurasian lynx also hunts smaller ungulates, like wild boar, chamois, young red and European fallow deer; they also readily hunt both juvenile and mature individuals from diminutive deer species, such as roe, musk deer, or the introduced (invasive) Indian muntjac. Although the lynx is known to have killed up to 30% of the roe deer population in northern Europe, they are not usually considered a threat to their numbers, as the roe deer reproduce yearly, with many fawns surviving infancy. Occasionally, lynx will take domestic livestock or poultry, but generally prefer avoiding human habitations. However, in Norway, lynxes have killed increasing numbers of sheep, up to 10,000 between 1996 and 2001.

== Threats ==
The most serious threats to the Balkan lynx are the low population size, habitat degradation, and poaching. Poaching affects the Balkan lynxes both directly and indirectly. Hunters that hunt the small wildlife and game indirectly harm the Balkan lynxes by restricting their source of food, such as roe deer, chamois, and hares. It is illegal to hunt Balkan lynxes but there has been evidence that there is a market for Balkan lynx fur. Stuffed lynxes can sometimes be seen as decorations in some restaurants in the countryside of Albania and North Macedonia.

Tourists resorts and recreational activities have little to no effects on the population, whereas sport hunting and ski resorts can disturb the population within the national parks, where the majority of the Balkan lynxes habitat. The degradation of habitat is primarily in Albania, where logging has taken its toll on the environment and negatively affects the Balkan lynx. Albania's forests have been recovering from over exploitation since the 1800s. Although it is illegal to continue logging in the protected Balkan lynx habitat, it is still done and can potentially destroy the only habitat the Balkan lynx has.

Because they have such low population density, it is difficult for mature adults to mate with each other. The population is separated into two different sub-populations in Albania and North Macedonia, further hindering the mating process, although both populations were confirmed to be stabilized by the Balkan Lynx Recovery Programme. There is a slight worry with the expansion of the native Carpathian and reintroduced Dinaric lynx population that may threaten the genetic integrity of the Balkan lynx population. Public attitudes towards the Balkan lynx were also gauged through social science studies, indicating that they are mostly positive, although not very well known and have many misconceptions about its size, behavior, and ecology.

This mating process will be further hindered by a complete separation of the two populations in Macedonia and Albania due to the construction of the Skavica Hydroelectric Power Plant. The area of the planned dam is used as the main migration corridor by the Balkan lynx between these two populations.

== Conservation ==
The Balkan lynx is considered a critically endangered subspecies by the International Union for Conservation of Nature (IUCN) and is the highest risk category for endangered species. The Balkan lynx is also protected under the Convention for International Trade of Endangered Species (CITIES) by Appendix II, the Bern Convention by Appendix III, the EU Habitats and Species Directive by Annexes II and IV, as well as all range countries.

A three-year program called the Balkan Lynx Recovery Programme (BLRP) was started in 2006 to combine the protection for lynxes and their habitats in Albania and North Macedonia. Sponsored by the Swiss-based MAVA Foundation, the goals of the program was to survey and monitor the lynx population, gathering data of their distribution, population tendencies, habitation, develop Conservation Strategy and National Action Plans across the range of the Balkan lynx, lobby for the Balkan lynx in protected areas in the European Green Belt, and build professional partnerships with relevant stakeholders in nature protection. The Balkan lynx was chosen as their figurehead and umbrella species. At the same time, a Human Dimension project was started in both Albania and North Macedonia, funded by the Research Council of Norway. The purpose of the project was to explore the human-large carnivore relationship, possible conflicts, the attitudes of the local people, and the challenges of cross border cooperation in large carnivore conservation.

The second phase of the Balkan Lynx Recovery Programme was put into place in 2010 continuing the work done since 2006. This time, they delved deeper and began a scientific study on the Balkan lynx, supported by the Swiss National Science Foundation. During this time, three male lynxes were caught and tagged with GPS collars and an intensive monitoring system was put into place at the core area of habitation, as well as a network monitoring wildlife. This project lasted from 2010 to 2012. The third phase of the BLRP began in 2013 to 2016 and focuses on raising awareness of the critical state of the Balkan lynx in primary schools locally, nationally, and internationally. They also continue the work on monitoring the core area of habitation of the Balkan lynx as well as expanding the project to combine research in both countries of North Macedonia and Albania.
