= Qelqëz =

Mountain in Albania

- Mali i Qelqëzës
- Location within Albania

Highest point
- Elevation: 1,662 m (5,453 ft)
- Prominence: 0 m (0 ft)
- Isolation: 53 m (174 ft)
- Coordinates: 40°22′59″N 20°27′01″E

Naming
- English translation: Glass Mountain

Geography
- Country: Albania
- Region: Southern Mountain Region
- Municipality: Përmet
- Parent range: Dangëllia Highlands

Geology
- Rock age: Paleogene
- Mountain type: mountain
- Rock type(s): flysch, limestone

Qelqëz (lit. 'Glass') is a mountain located in the Dangëlli Highlands, in southern Albania. Part of the only mountain range that is divided into three branches, Qelqëz, the tallest peak 1,662 m (5,453 ft), highlights the first branch which commences at Miçan Pass, continues through Qelqëz, Dëllënjë Pass and finally at Mali i Piskalit 1,437 m (4,715 ft), gradually descending towards the upper reaches of Lengaricë river in the southeast. Along its course, it connects with the mountains of Postenan 1,552 m (5,092 ft) and Melesin 1,441 m (4,728 ft).

== History ==
Qelqëz defines the historical north-eastern limit of the geographic region of Epirus proper, as well as the south-eastern limit of Illyria.

== Geology ==
The mountain forms a relief with an uneven and wavy appearance, featuring an asymmetrical slope. It is primarily composed of flysch, with Paleogene limestone emerging between the layers. Its geological structures are broken up by transverse and longitudinal tectonic detachments, which are most prominent in the steeper terrain, with some sections having developed transverse valleys.

== Biodiversity ==
The sparse vegetation found in the lower sections of the western slope consists mainly of deciduous trees and shrubs. Oaks do not subsist a continuous belt, with certain areas being entirely devoid of them. Instead, there is a direct transition from bushes to Mediterranean conifers, which form several forests, most notably the Fir of Hotovë-Dangëlli National Park.

== See also ==
- List of mountains in Albania

== Bibliography ==
- Peterson-Bidoshi, Kristin (2006). "Qazim Shemaj's "Veronica's Dream": A Contemporary Albanian Fairytale". Journal of the Slavic and East European Folklore Association. XI. Slavic & East European Folklore Association: 78–116.
- Greenwalt, William S. (2011). "Macedonia, Illyria and Epirus". In Roisman, Joseph; Worthington, Ian (eds.). A Companion to Ancient Macedonia. John Wiley & Sons. pp. 279–305. ISBN 978-1-4443-5163-7.
- Suha, Mikko (2021). Late Classical – Hellenistic Fortifications in Epirus: Fourth to Second Century BC (Thesis). Unigrafia, University of Helsinki. ISBN 978-951-51-7673-8.
