= Goliku =

Mountain in Albania

- Mali i Golikut
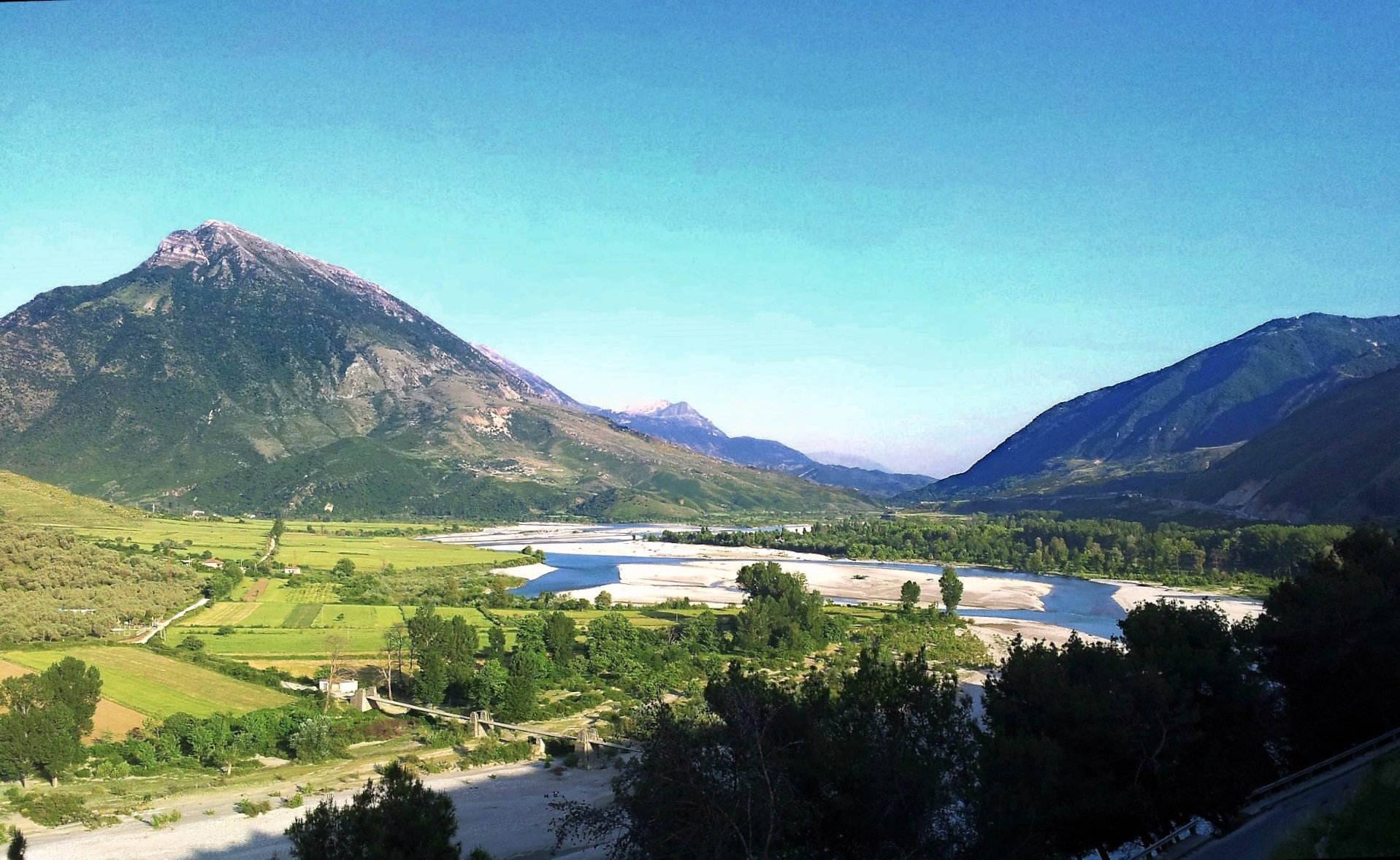
- Goliku overlooking Vjosa river

Highest point
- Elevation: 1,722 m (5,650 ft)
- Prominence: 155 m (509 ft)
- Isolation: 4.2 km (2.6 mi)
- Coordinates: 40°15′49″N 20°06′54″E

Geography
- Location within Albania
- Country: Albania
- Region: Southern Mountain Region
- Municipality: Tepelenë
- Parent range: Trebeshinë–Dhëmbel–Nemërçkë

Geology
- Rock age: Late Cretaceous
- Mountain type: mountain
- Rock type: limestone

Goliku is a mountain in southern Albania, reaching an elevation of 1,722 m (5,650 ft) above sea level. It is situated southeast of Tepelenë, on the northwestern margin of the Zagori Nature Park, near Dragot.

In antiquity, the mountain was known as Asnau.

== Geology ==
Goliku forms part of the broader mountainous system known as the Trebeshinë–Dhëmbel–Nemërçkë range.

The area is hydrologically significant, as two major rivers meet nearby: Vjosa, flowing from the direction of Përmet; and Drino, which originates near Gjirokastër.

Geologically, the mountain represents a carbonate anticlinal structure composed primarily of Late Cretaceous limestone. The resistant carbonate formations have played a decisive role in shaping its steep slopes and rugged relief.

== Climbing route ==
The most common ascent to the summit begins from the village of Peshtan, approximately 16 kilometers east of Tepelenë, located on the left bank of the Vjosa river near its confluence with the Zagori stream.

The route follows a forested mountain path that climbs gradually to around 1,100 meters. Above this elevation, the terrain becomes more open and exposed, with steeper and rockier slopes leading to the summit ridge.

The ascent typically requires about four hours, while the descent takes approximately three hours. The round-trip distance is roughly 11 kilometers, with an elevation gain of about 1,400 meters.

== Greco-Italian War ==
On the night of 27–28 October 1940, following Benito Mussolini's orders to invade Greece from Italian-controlled Albania, units of the 3rd Regiment of the Grenadiers of Sardinia advanced south from Konispol and crossed the Greco-Albanian border where they attacked and overran several Greek border outposts.

As the campaign unfolded and the Greek Army launched a counteroffensive that pushed the fighting northward into Albanian territory, Goliku emerged as one of the key strongholds of the war front, becoming strategically important for surveillance, artillery deployment and the organization of defensive positions.

== See also ==
- List of mountains in Albania
