= Papingu =

Mountain in Albania

- Maja e Papingut
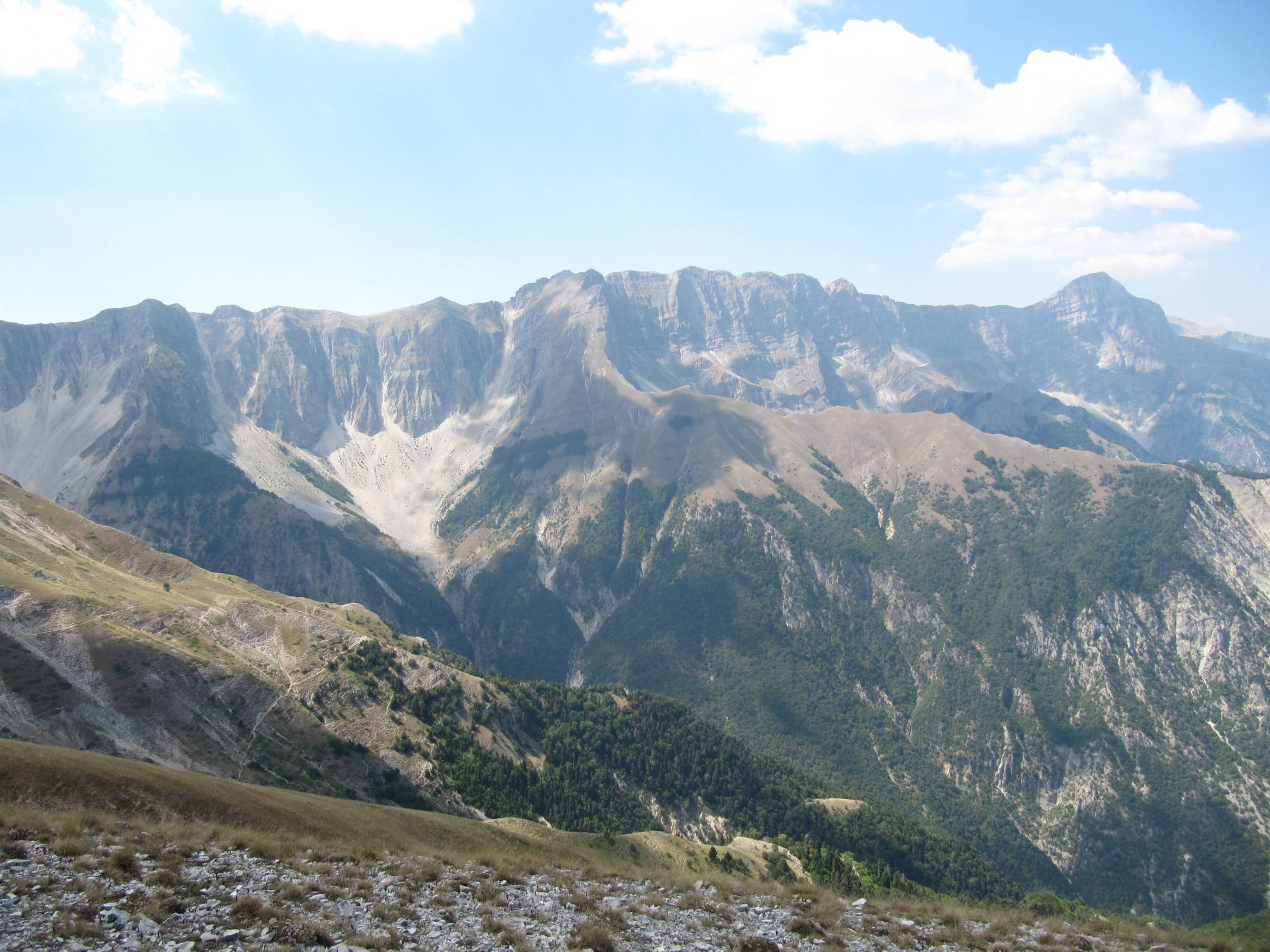
- View of Maja e Papingut overlooking the Nemërçka range

Highest point
- Elevation: 2,482 m (8,143 ft)
- Prominence: 1,797 m (5,896 ft)
- Isolation: 33.2 km (20.6 mi)
- Listing: Ultra, Ribu
- Coordinates: 40°07′24″N 20°25′57″E

Geography
- Location within Albania
- Country: Albania
- Region: Southern Mountain Region
- Municipality: Përmet, Gjirokastër
- Parent range: Trebeshinë–Dhëmbel–Nemërçkë

Geology
- Rock age: Cretaceous
- Mountain type: summit
- Rock type: limestone

Papingu is a summit of the Nemërçka massif, in southern Albania. Reaching a height of 2,482 m (8,143 ft), it is the 3rd most prominent peak in the country and the 44th most prominent peak in Europe.

== Name ==
The toponym Papingu is an Albanian formation composed of the Albanian negative particle pa, and the noun peng, -u meaning 'pledge, hostage', stemming from the Latin pignus 'pledge, hostage'. The toponym is related to the village named Papingo in Zagori, Greece which is of the same etymological origin.

== Geology ==
Formerly known as Maja e Dritës, the peak is nestled in the Southern Mountain Region, between the municipalities of Përmet and Gjirokastër, where it takes on the shape of a pyramid. It is composed primarily of Cretaceous limestone rocks with asymmetrical backs. The eastern side has undergone significant changes from quaternary ice, resulting in the formation of large cirques. The peak is blanketed in snow throughout the year and is a popular destination for mountain climbers.

== See also ==
- List of mountains in Albania
- List of European ultra-prominent peaks
