= Melesin =

Mountain in Albania

- Mali i Melesinit
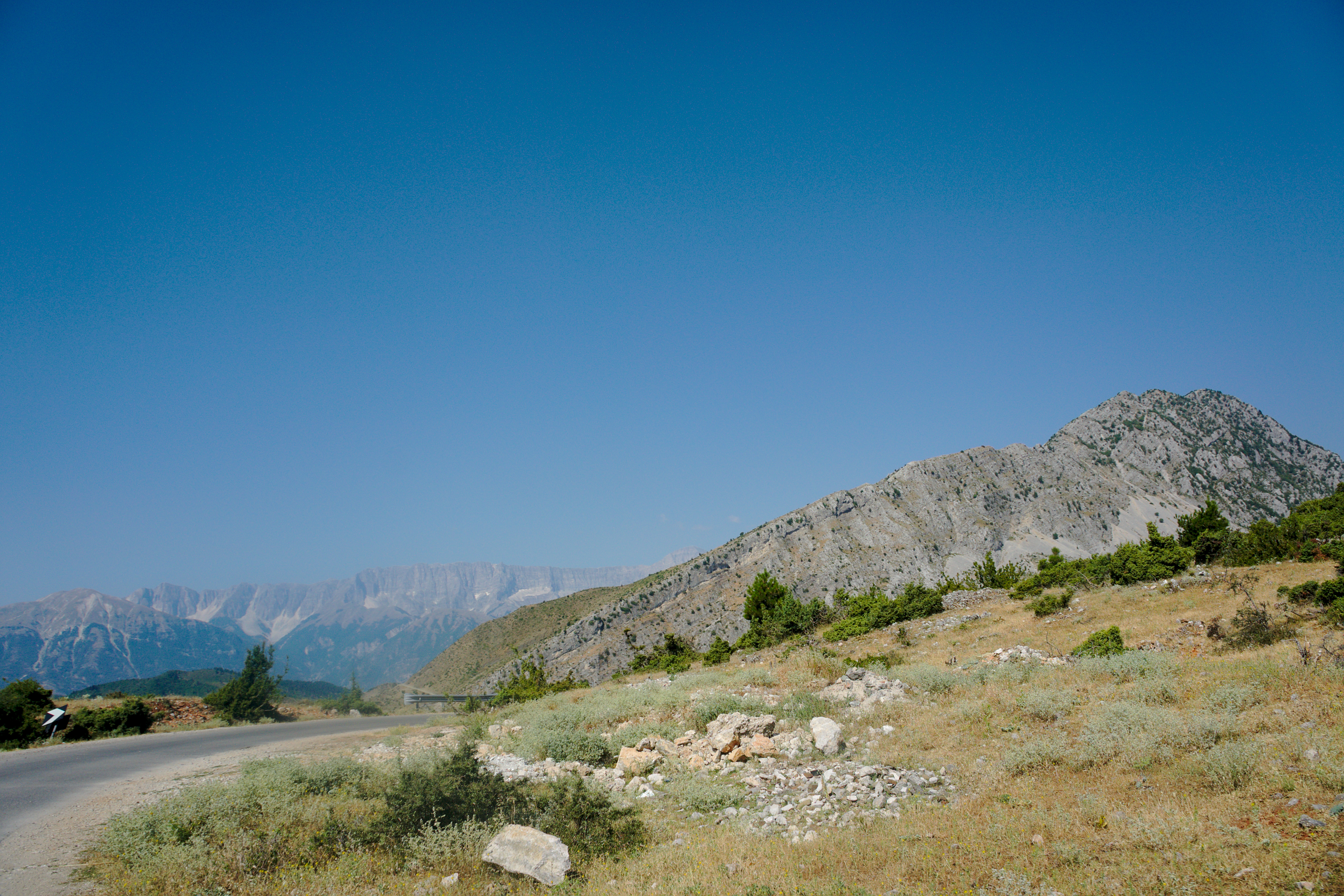
- View of Melesin with Nemërçka from a distance

Highest point
- Elevation: 1,411 m (4,629 ft)
- Prominence: 503 m (1,650 ft)
- Isolation: 4.8 km (3.0 mi)
- Coordinates: 40°09′25″N 20°34′44″E

Geography
- Location within Albania
- Country: Albania
- Region: Southern Mountain Region
- Municipality: Përmet, Kolonjë
- Parent range: Melesin; Postenan

Geology
- Rock age: Paleogene
- Mountain type: mountain
- Rock type(s): limestone, flysch

Melesin is a mountain situated along the boundary between the municipalities of Përmet and Kolonjë, in southeastern Albania. It forms part of the Melesin–Postenan mountain chain, reaching an elevation of 1,411 m (4,629 ft) above sea level. The town of Leskovik lies at its northeastern foothills and to the west it faces the Fir of Hotovë-Dangëlli National Park.

== Geology ==
The mountain is composed mainly of limestone and Paleogene flysch formations. These sedimentary rocks have influenced the development of its sharp ridges, steep escarpments and uneven morphology.

== Biodiversity ==
Vegetation is denser on the western slope, where shrublands dominate at lower elevations and gradually give way to oak forests higher up. On the steeper sections, Macedonian pine (Pinus peuce) is also present, extending to the summit.

== See also ==
- List of mountains in Albania
