= Shëndelli =

Mountain in Albania

- Mali i Shëndellisë
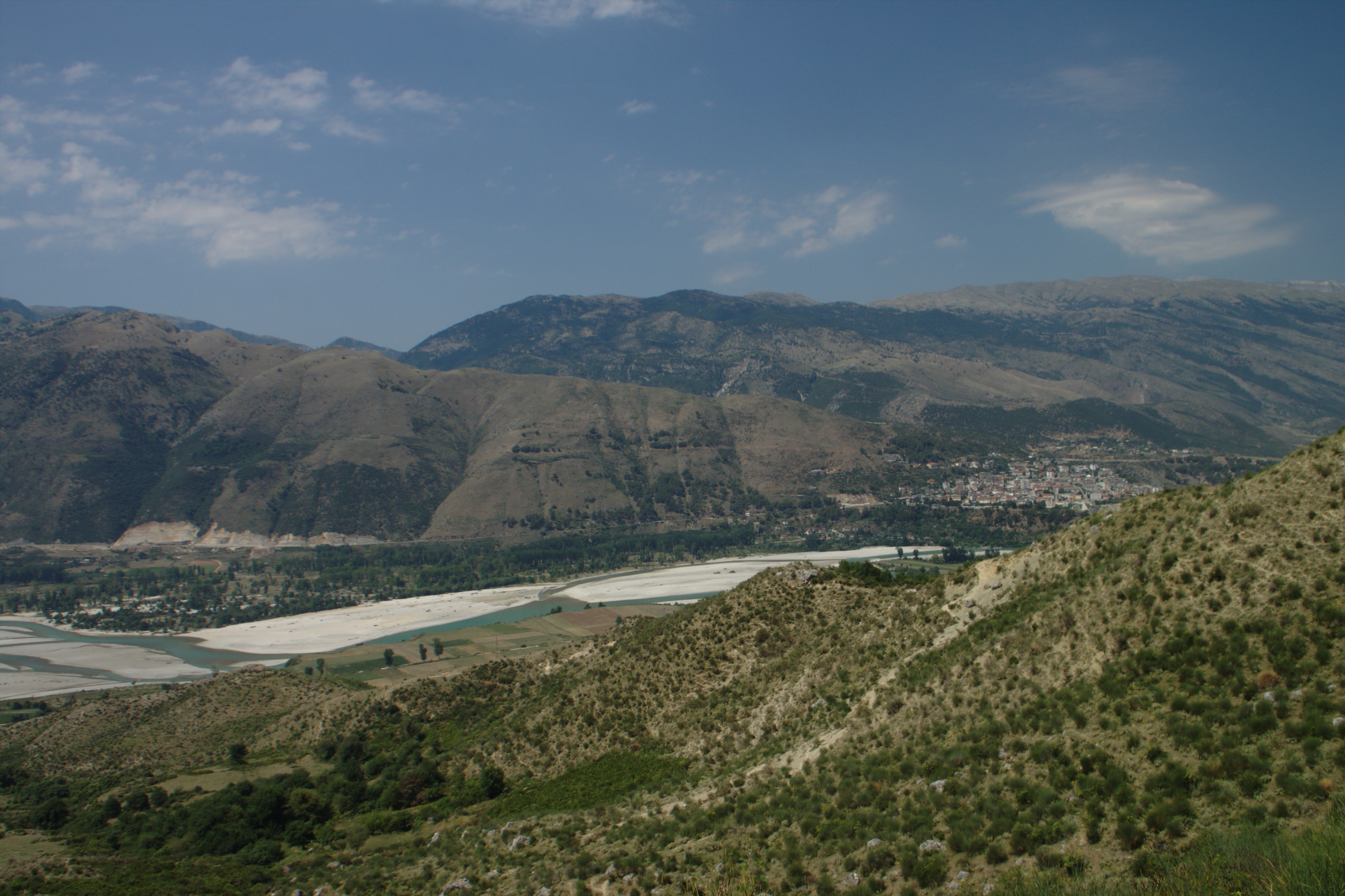
- View of the mountain from Beçisht

Highest point
- Elevation: 1,802 m (5,912 ft)
- Prominence: 663 m (2,175 ft)
- Isolation: 18 m (59 ft)
- Coordinates: 40°20′17″N 20°03′32″E

Naming
- English translation: Holy Sun

Geography
- Location within Albania
- Country: Albania
- Region: Southern Mountain Region
- Municipality: Tepelenë
- Parent range: Shëndelli-Lunxhëri-Bureto

Geology
- Mountain type: mountain
- Rock type: limestone

Shëndelli (lit. 'Holy Sun') is a mountain located in the municipality of Tepelenë, in southern Albania. Situated at the emergence of the Shëndelli-Lunxhëri-Bureto mountain chain, its highest elevation is 1,802 m (5,912 ft).

== Geology ==
Shëndelli is bordered by the Vjosa valley to the west and the Mezhgoran and Maricaj stream valleys to the east, separating it from Trebeshinë mountain. It stretches from the Lutfinjë river valley in the north to the mouth of Këlcyrë in the south at a length of about 10–12 km (6–7 mi) with a northwest-southeast orientation.

The mountain is primarily composed of limestone. Its ridge is flat, with a gradual decline towards the north. As a result of karst phenomena, surface water flows are absent. The western slope falls more evenly in the direction of the Vjosa valley and attracts moisture from winds blowing in that direction.

Forests are sparse, with Mediterranean shrub, oak trees, as well as summer pastures scattered throughout.

The nearby settlements of Dragot, Damës, Kashisht and Beçisht are established at the base of the western slope.

== Folklore ==
The mountain is considered by Albanians as a sacred place. In local folk beliefs it is associated with the cult of the mountain peaks and the cult of the Sun (Dielli).

== See also ==
- List of mountains in Albania

== Bibliography ==
- Gjoni, Irena (2012). Marrëdhënie të miteve dhe kulteve të bregdetit të Jonit me areale të tjera mitike (PhD) (in Albanian). Tirana: University of Tirana, Faculty of History and Philology.
