= Mali i Postenanit =

Mountain in Albania

Postenan
- Mali i Postenanit
- Location within Albania

Highest point
- Elevation: 1,559 m (5,115 ft)
- Prominence: 462 m (1,516 ft)
- Isolation: 9.2 km (5.7 mi)
- Coordinates: 40°11′57″N 20°31′11″E

Geography
- Country: Albania
- Region: Southern Mountain Region
- Municipality: Përmet, Kolonjë
- Parent range: Melesin; Postenan

Geology
- Rock age: Paleogene
- Mountain type: mountain
- Rock type(s): limestone, flysch

Postenan is a mountain situated along the administrative boundary between Përmet and Kolonjë municipalities, in southeastern Albania. It rises to an elevation of 1,559 m (5,115 ft) above sea level, forming part of the Melesin–Postenan mountain chain.

== Geology ==
The mountain is composed primarily of Paleogene limestone and flysch deposits. Structurally, it forms a distinct monoclinal ridge, separated from Melesin by the Pagoni gorge.

Its relief is highly dissected and characterized by numerous karst forms, creating strong morphological contrasts. The eastern slope is relatively steep, whereas the western slope descends more gradually toward the valley of Vjosa river.

== Biodiversity ==
Vegetation cover includes oak, hornbeam, ash, wild cherry and, more rarely, pine. The mountain is also abundant in rich summer pastures used for seasonal grazing.

== See also ==
- List of mountains in Albania
