= Saint Christos the Arvanid =

Albanian 18th c. saint

Saint Christos the Arvanid (or the Gardener)
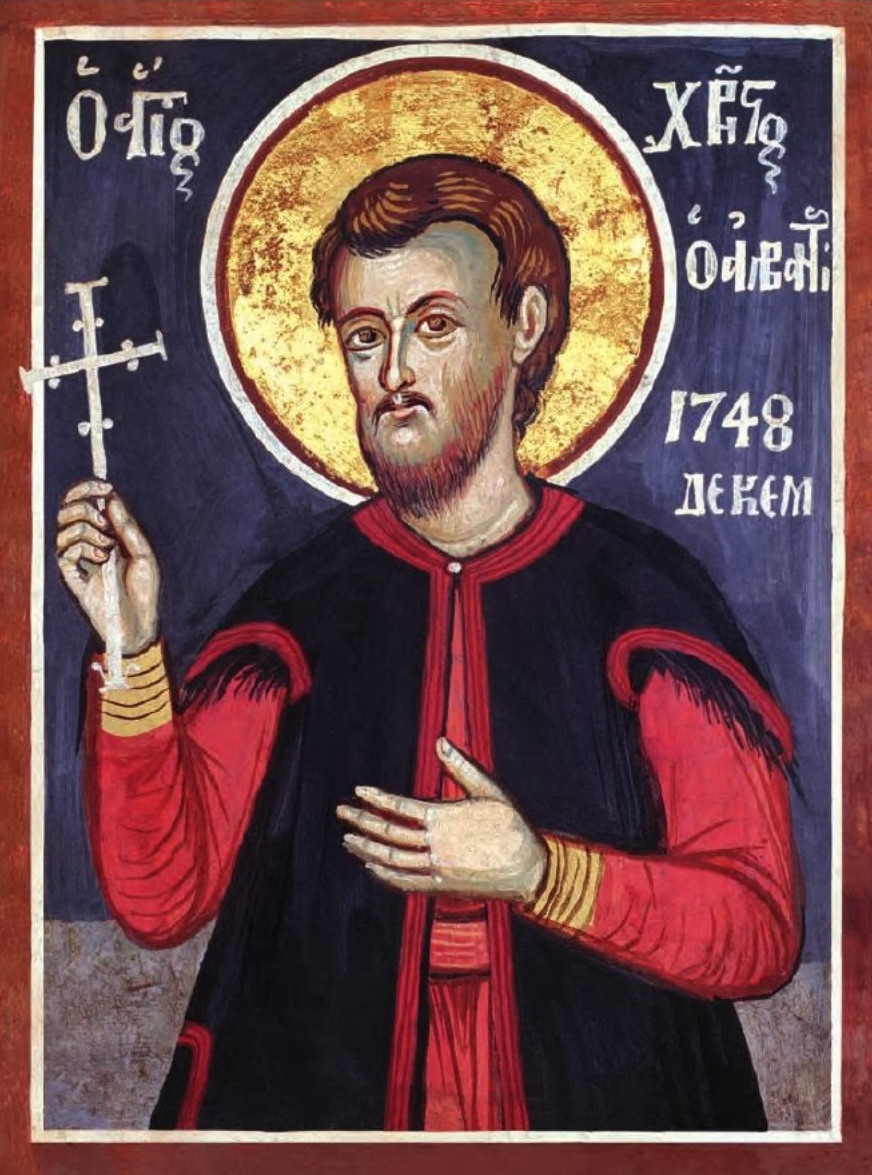
- Icon of Saint Kristo the Albanian
- Born: Unknown; Përmet, Albania, Ottoman Empire
- Died: 12 February 1748
- Cause of death: Beheaded

Saint Christos (Christ) the Arvanid or the Gardener (Albanian: Shën Kristo Kopshtari) was an 18th-century Eastern Orthodox saint from Albania.

== Life ==
Saint Kristo the Arvanid was an Albanian born in Përmet and lived in the early 18th century during the Ottoman rule of the Balkans. Little is known of his early life, besides that he lived as a gardener and sought out further business opportunities in Constantinople, leaving Albania behind.

In 1748 he began working in the Sultan's garden in Constantinople. This is commonly exemplified in iconography showing Saint Kristo holding apples. While negotiating a price for his apples with a Muslim, he was accused of desiring to become a Muslim by his customer after they were unable to agree on the value of his apples. As was the custom in the Ottoman period, Kristo was brought before Islamic authorities, where those bearing false witness testified that he indeed declared he wanted to convert. Kristo persisted that he would not become a Muslim and since he was a Christian, his testimony was not equal to that of a Muslim.

== Martyrdom ==
After being imprisoned for two years and tortured to renounce Christianity he continued to hold onto his Christian faith. A monk by the name of Kaisarios Dapontes visited him while he was in Ottoman custody, bringing him food. Kristo rejected the food, stating "Why should I eat? I do not expect to live, so I may as well die hungering and thirsting for Christ." Kristo was then sentenced to be beheaded for apostasy for refusing to follow through with his alleged conversion to Islam. In order to have money to provide a memorial service, Kristo asked Dapontes to sell a metal file he had.

Kristo was beheaded on February 12, 1748. He was then canonized as a neo-martyr.
