= Mali i Buretos =

Mountain in Albania

Bureto
- Mali i Buretos
- Location within Albania

Highest point
- Elevation: 1,763 m (5,784 ft)
- Prominence: 817 m (2,680 ft)
- Isolation: 428 m (1,404 ft)
- Coordinates: 40°01′44″N 20°17′56″E

Geography
- Country: Albania
- Region: Southern Mountain Region
- Municipality: Libohovë
- Parent range: Shëndelli–Lunxhëri–Bureto

Geology
- Rock age(s): Cretaceous, Paleogene
- Mountain type: mountain
- Rock type(s): limestone, flysch

Bureto is a mountain located in the municipality of Libohovë, in southern Albania. It forms an integral part of the Shëndelli–Lunxhëri–Bureto mountain chain. Its highest peak, Maja e Arkovolës, reaches a height of 1,763 m (5,784 ft).

== Geology ==
Bureto constitutes the watershed boundary between the waters that accumulate in the Suha and Drino rivers. It is composed primarily of Cretaceous and Paleogene limestone and less of flysch, forming an anticlinal arch-shaped structure with asymmetrical arms. The ridge of the mountain is flat, with slight undulations, filled with surface karst forms (pits, funnels), therefore there are few surface water flows. The western slope is steep and contorted by regional tectonic detachments, resulting in a number of mineral water springs emerging from its foothills, most notably Glina.

== Biodiversity ==
Snow covers the top of the mountain during winter, while bushes and oaks grow on its eastern slope. The surrounding area is abound with summer pastures and medicinal plants. Bureto is inhabited by human population on both sides, up to an elevation of 700 m (2,300 ft). The nearby town of Libohovë is situated on its western foothills.

== See also ==
- List of mountains in Albania
