= Mali i Lunxhërisë =

Mountain in Albania

Lunxhëri
- Mali i Lunxhërisë
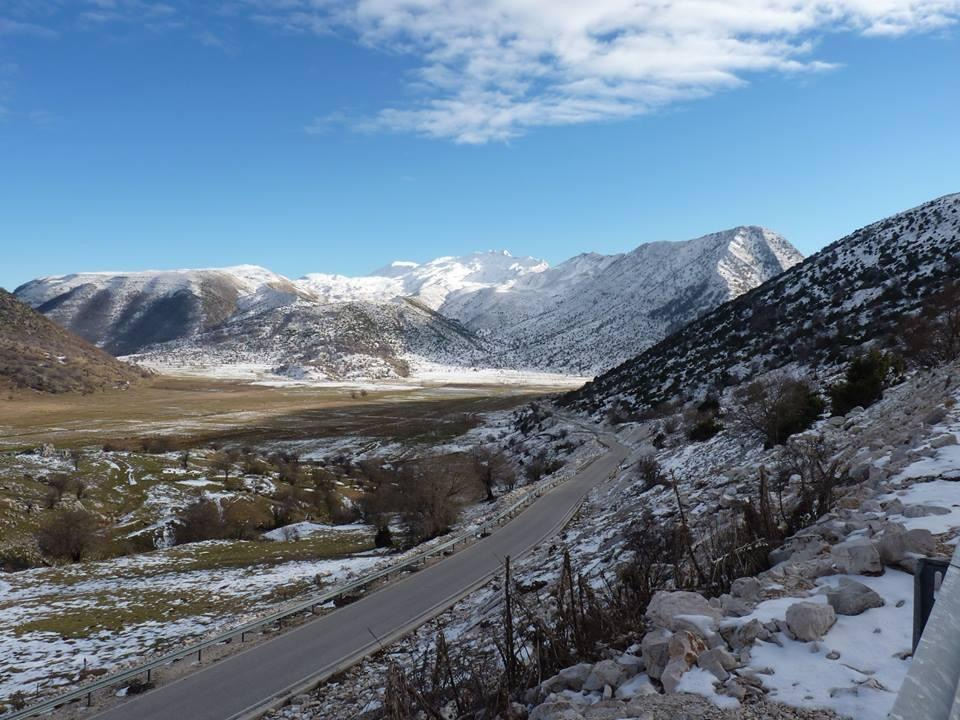
- Mount Lunxhëri seen from Fusha e Çajupit

Highest point
- Elevation: 2,155 m (7,070 ft)
- Prominence: 1,308 m (4,291 ft)
- Isolation: 10.3 km (6.4 mi)
- Listing: Ribu
- Coordinates: 40°20′17″N 20°03′32″E

Geography
- Location within Albania
- Country: Albania
- Region: Southern Mountain Region
- Municipality: Gjirokastër
- Parent range: Shëndelli–Lunxhëri–Bureto

Geology
- Mountain type: massif
- Rock type(s): limestone, flysch

Lunxhëri is a massif located in Gjirokastër municipality, in southern Albania. It forms part of the Shëndelli–Lunxhëri–Bureto mountain chain, extending approximately 25 km (16 mi) from Gryka e Këlcyrës to Gryka e Selckës, in a general northwest-southeast orientation. Its highest peak, Maja e Spilesë (Lalucit), reaches a height of 2,155 m (7,070 ft).

== Geology ==
The mountain is composed primarily of limestone with some flysch, creating an anticlinal structure shaped by tectonic forces. The ridge dividing the watershed is flat but exhibits karst phenomena. The western slope, which descends towards the Drino valley, is gentler and wider, featuring numerous karst springs, particularly near tectonic fractures. Several streams with significant erosive power flow down this slope, including the Nivica river as well as the streams of Dhoksat, Qestorat, Tranoshishtë and Karai. The eastern slope is steeper, with less surface water flow and evidence of Quaternary glacial activity.

== Biodiversity ==
Forests are scarce, with maple, ash, sturgeon, hornbeam and spruce being the primary tree species. The area also encompasses summer pastures and medicinal plants.

Along the western slope, numerous settlements can be found, inhabiting heights of up to 900 m (3,000 ft).

== See also ==
- List of mountains in Albania
