= Antoneta Papapavli =

Albanian actress (1938–2013)

- Born: 17 February 1938; Përmet, Kingdom of Albania
- Died: 13 September 2013 (aged 75); Tirana, Albania
- Occupation: Actress
- Years active: 1964–1988

Antoneta Papapavli (17 February 1938 – 13 September 2013) was an Albanian actress. She played the roles of mothers, mountaineers, directors and aristocrats ladies throughout her work in films and theater. She was awarded the title Merited Artist (Artiste e Merituar) in recognition of her artistic career.

== Biography ==
Papapavli was born on 17 February 1938 in Përmet in southern Albania. She graduated from the drama department of the Higher Institute of Arts (Instituti i Lartë i Arteve, ILA) in Tirana. In 1964, she was appointed as an actress at the People's Theatre (Teatri Popullor), where she performed in more than 50 theatrical productions.

Her theatre roles included Afroviti in Karnavalet e Korçës, Cuca in Cuca e maleve, Drita in Drita, Mara in Toka jonë, Deizi in Arturo Ui, Bajamja in Fytyra e dytë, Lady Milford in Intrigë dhe dashuri, Adela in Shkëlqimi dhe rënia e shokut Zylo, and the Grandmother in Hijet e natës.

Papapavli also appeared in Albanian films, playing a variety of supporting roles. Her film credits included Komisari i dritës (1966), Përballimi (1976), Apasionata (1983), Hije që mbeten pas (1985), and Hetimi vazhdon (1988).

She retired from the stage in October 1985, although accounts of her career also describe her withdrawal from acting as a consequence of health problems. She spent the later years of her life away from the stage and public performances.

She died in her sleep on 13 September 2013, at the age of 75 in Tirana.

== Theatre roles ==
Some of Papapavli's notable theatre roles included:

- Olimbia in The Carnivals of Korçë (Karnavalet e Korçës)
- Cuca in The Girl of the Mountains (Cuca e maleve)
- Mara in Our Land (Toka jonë)
- Deizi in Arturo Ui (Arturo Ui)
- Bajamja in The Second Face (Fytyra e dytë)
- Lady Milford in Intrigue and Love (Intrigë dhe dashuri)
- Adela in The Rise and Fall of Comrade Zylo (Shkëlqimi dhe rënia e shokut Zylo)
- The Grandmother in Shadows of the Night (Hijet e natës)

== Filmography ==
Year	Film (English translation)	Role
1966	The Commissar of Light (Komisari i dritës)	Ngjela
1976	Confrontation (Përballimi)	Klea
1976	Sounds of War (Tinguj lufte)	Galip's wife
1977	They Were Four (Ata ishin katër)	Council member
1979	Beyond the Stone Walls (Përtej mureve të gurta)	Asime's mother
1980	The Girl from the Village (Shoqja nga fshati)	Lefka
1981	Like Everyone Else (Si gjithë të tjerët)	Jeta's mother
1981	The Threat (Kërcënimi)	Marina, Ema's mother
1981	Our Friend Tili (Shoku ynë Tili)	School principal
1981	Traces in the Blue (Gjurmë në kaltërsi)	Commander Marko's wife
1983	Passionate (Apasionata)	Mira's teacher
1984	The Students of My Class (Nxënësit e klasës sime)	Vangjelia, Kristofor's wife
1984	The First Voyage (Lundrimi i parë)	The captain's wife
1985	Shadows That Remain Behind (Hije që mbeten pas)	Sania, Marjeta's mother
1986	When You Part from Your Friends (Kur ndahesh nga shokët)	Zana's mother
1986	When the Doors of Life Open (Kur hapen dyert e jetës)	Liza's mother
1988	The Investigation Continues (Hetimi vazhdon)	The investigator's mother
