= Edison Qafa =

Albanian footballer

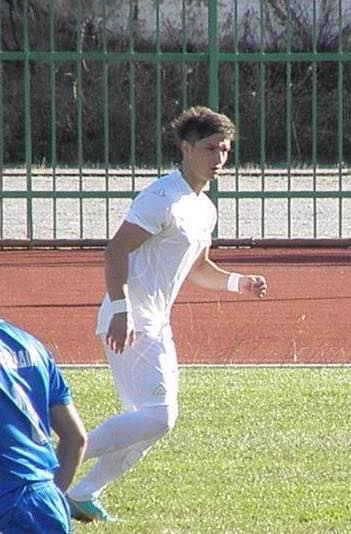

Personal information
- Full name: Edison Qafa
- Date of birth: 16 November 1989 (age 36)
- Place of birth: Përmet, Albania
- Position: Striker

Senior career*
| Years | Team | Apps | (Gls) |
| 2007–2009 | Ermionida | 32 | (12) |
| 2009–2010 | Thiva | 17 | (6) |
| 2011 | Kamza | 10 | (2) |
| 2012–2013 | Apolonia | 11 | (2) |
| 2013 | Chalkida | 12 | (3) |
| 2015–2016 | Kukësi | 8 | (0) |
| 2015–2016 | Kukësi B | 3 | (0) |
- * Club domestic league appearances and goals

Edison Qafa (born 16 November 1989 in Përmet) is an Albanian footballer who most recently played as a striker for FK Kukësi in the Albanian Superliga.
