= Dhëmbel =

Mountain chain in Albania

- Mali i Dhëmbelit
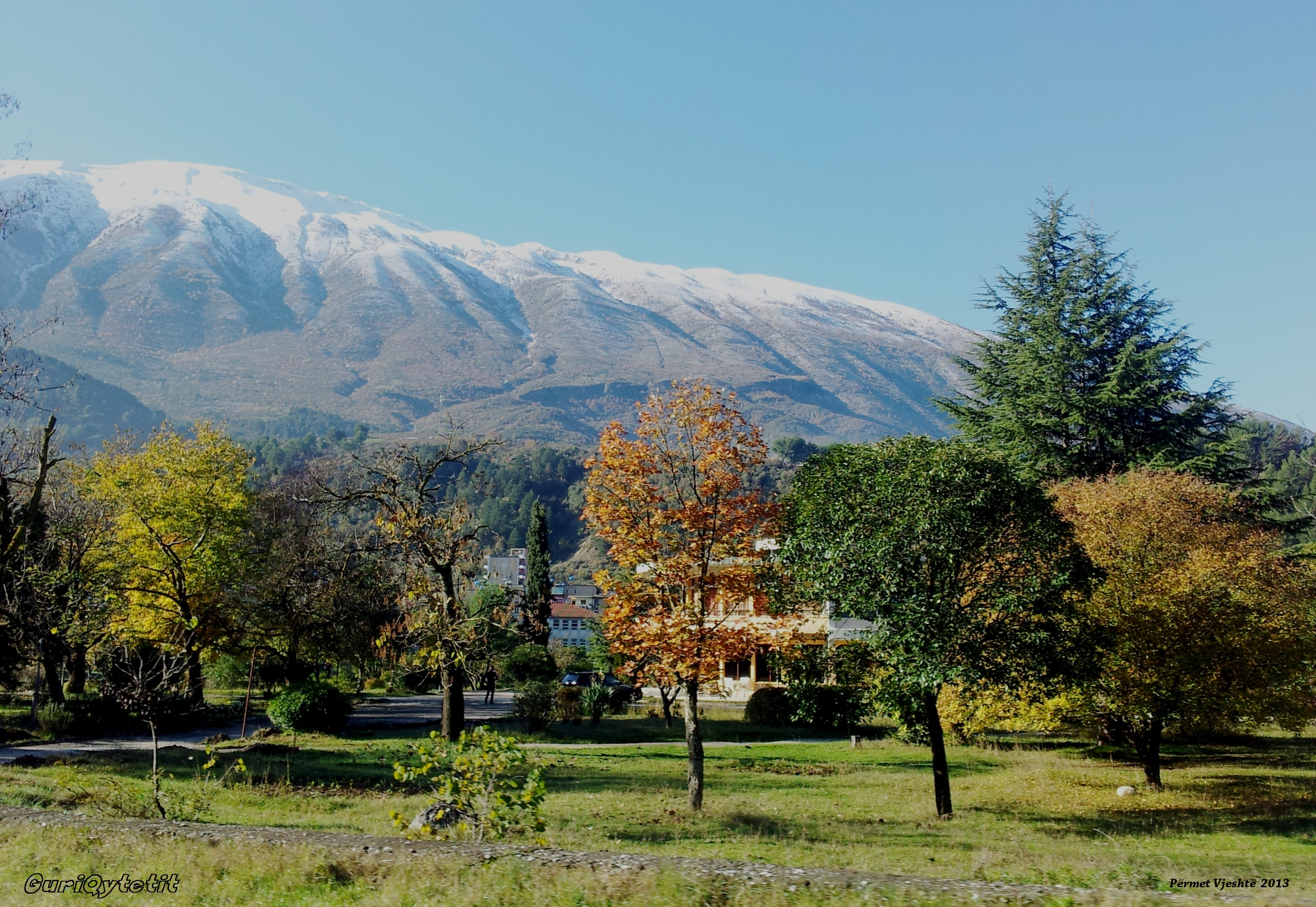
- View of Dhëmbel from Përmet

Highest point
- Elevation: 2,050.7 m (6,728 ft)
- Prominence: 593 m (1,946 ft)
- Isolation: 560 m (1,840 ft)
- Coordinates: 40°11′58″N 20°18′44″E

Geography
- Location within Albania
- Country: Albania
- Region: Southern Mountain Region
- Municipality: Gjirokastër, Përmet
- Parent range: Trebeshinë–Dhëmbel–Nemërçkë

Geology
- Mountain type: massif
- Rock type(s): limestone, flysch

Dhëmbel (def. 'Dhëmbeli') is a massif situated on the border between Gjirokastër and Përmet municipalities, in southern Albania. Part of the Trebeshinë–Dhëmbel–Nemërçkë mountain range, it rises at an elevation of 2,050.7 m (6,728 ft) and stretches approximately 10–12 km (6.2–7.5 mi) from Gryka e Këlcyrës in the north to Qafa e Dhëmbelit in the south.

== Geology ==
The massif has a northwest-southeast orientation and is composed primarily of limestone, with a smaller presence of flysch, forming an asymmetrical anticlinal structure. The western slope is more steeply inclined and the watershed ridge is flat, with karst features, gradually declining towards the mouth of Këlcyrë. While there are no visible surface water flows, Dhëmbel holds a large supply of underground water reserves that drain from the Këlcyrë gorge, where 8-10 karst springs emerge from the Vjosa riverbed.

== Biodiversity ==
A narrow band of Mediterranean shrub is found at the base of the mountain and the numerous summer pastures nurture various types of medicinal plants such as mountain tea, orchid and hawthorn.

== See also ==
- List of mountains in Albania
