= Mali i Trebeshinës =

Mountain in Albania

Trebeshinë
- Mali i Trebeshinës
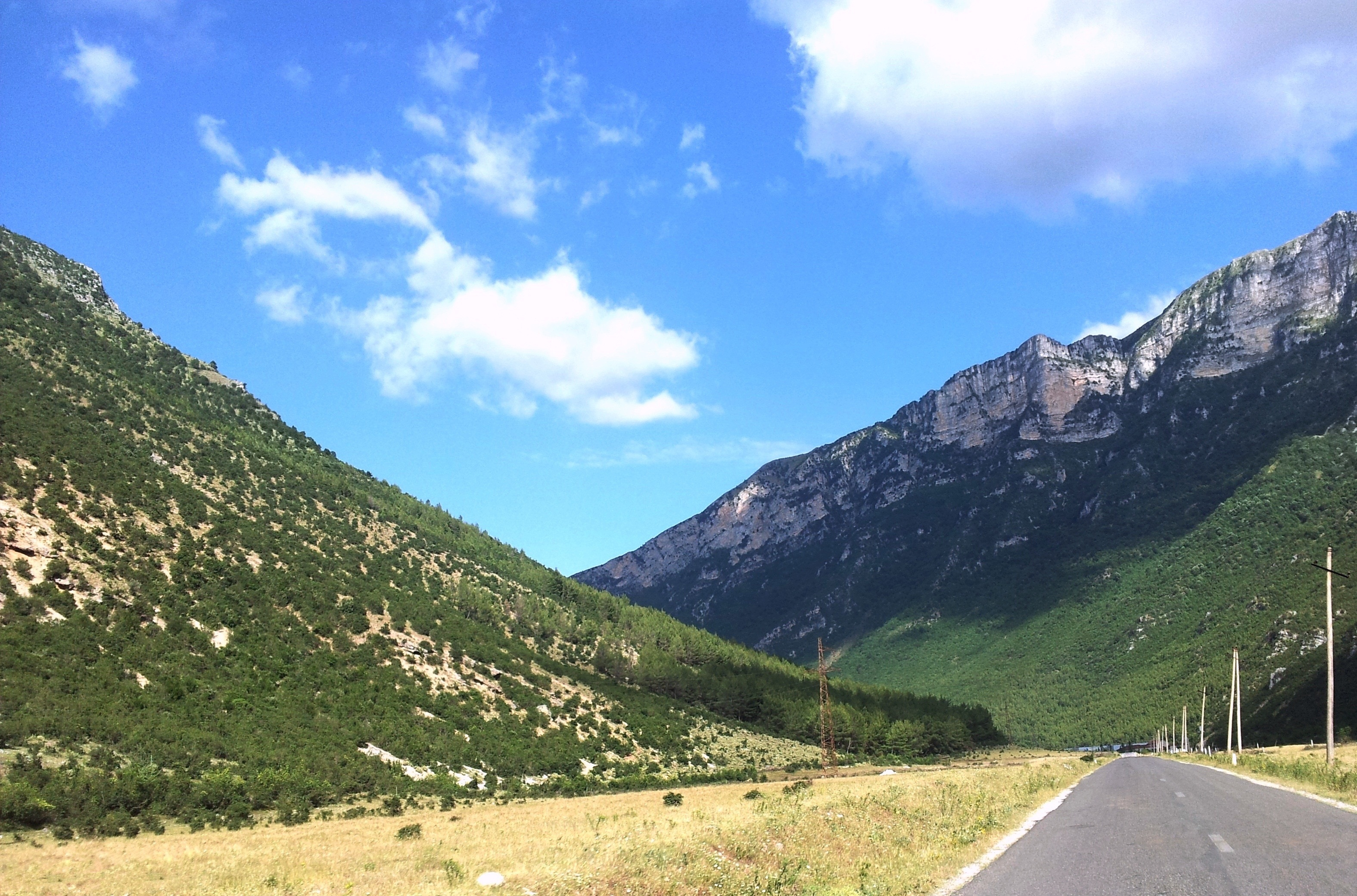
- View of the Këlcyrë Gorge

Highest point
- Elevation: 1,922 m (6,306 ft)
- Prominence: 1,370 m (4,490 ft)
- Isolation: 13.9 km (8.6 mi)
- Listing: Ribu
- Coordinates: 40°20′31″N 20°06′18″E

Geography
- Location within Albania
- Country: Albania
- Region: Southern Mountain Region
- Municipality: Përmet, Tepelenë
- Parent range: Trebeshinë-Dhëmbel–Nemërçkë

Geology
- Rock age(s): Mesozoic, Neogene
- Mountain type: massif
- Rock type: limestone

Trebeshinë is a massif situated on the border between Përmet and Tepelenë municipalities, in southern Albania.

Part of the Trebeshinë–Dhëmbel–Nemërçkë mountain range, it stretches approximately 15–16 km (9.3–9.9 mi) in length, from the Kiçoku Pass to the Gorge of Këlcyrë, in a northwest-southeast orientation, reaching a height of 1,922 m (6,306 ft).

== Geology ==
Composed primarily of Mesozoic and Neogene limestone, the mountain forms an anticline in the shape of a box, with a dome-shaped ridge carved from karst processes. Trebeshinë features numerous dry streams with shallow beds flowing down its slopes. On the eastern slope, the landscape is covered with bushes and oak trees. Summer pastures and medicinal plants are also widespread.

== See also ==
- List of mountains in Albania
