= Fir of Hotovë-Dangëlli National Park =

Protected area and a tourist attraction in Albania

- Parku Kombëtar Bredhi i Hotovës-Dangëlli
- IUCN category II (national park)
- Official logo

- Location within Albania Location within Europe
- Location: Gjirokastër County, Korçë County
- Nearest city: Përmet
- Coordinates: 40°18′13″N 20°24′40″E
- Area: 36,003.76 hectares (360.0376 km^{2})
- Designated: 17 December 2008
- Governing body: National Agency of Protected Areas

Fir of Hotovë-Dangëlli National Park (Albanian: Parku Kombëtar "Bredhi i Hotovës-Dangëlli") is the largest national park in Albania located in Gjirokastër County with a surface area of 34,361 ha (343.61 km^{2}). The park takes its name from the Hotova Fir, which is considered one of the most important Mediterranean plant relics of the country. The park is made up of hilly and mountainous terrain with limestone and sandstone deposits as well as numerous valleys, canyons, gorges, rivers and dense deciduous and coniferous forests. The International Union for Conservation of Nature (IUCN) has listed the park as Category II. The park also includes 11 natural monuments.

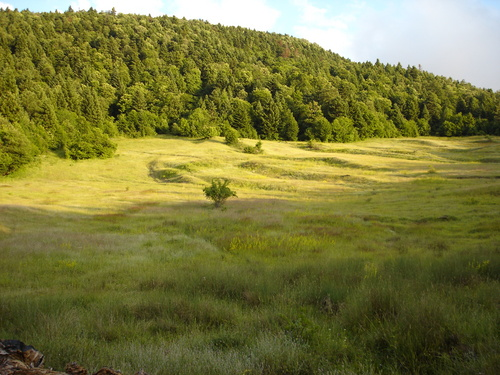
Typical landscape highlighting the fir forests

The park rises over a very remote mountainous region of Nemërçka and Tomorr between the Vjosa Valley in the west, Leskovik in the south, Erseka in the southeast and the Osum Valley in the northeast. Close to Petran is the narrow and deep Lengarica Canyon with numerous caves and thermal springs such as Banjat e Bënjës. Within the boundaries of the park there are numerous villages including Frashër, which is well known located in the heart of the park. In terms of hydrology, Vjosa is the main river forming the western bound of the park, flowing through Përmet until discharging into the Adriatic Sea.

The park experiences mediterranean climate with moderate rainy winters and dry, warm to hot summers. During winter, visitors can appreciate the snow blanket covering the firs, and in the summer the abundance of fresh air away as an escape from the Albanian summer heat. Its mean monthly temperature ranges between 3 °C (37 °F) in January and 30 °C (86 °F) in August with annual precipitation ranging between 500 millimetres (20 inches) and 1,800 millimetres (71 inches) depending on geographic region and prevailing climate type.

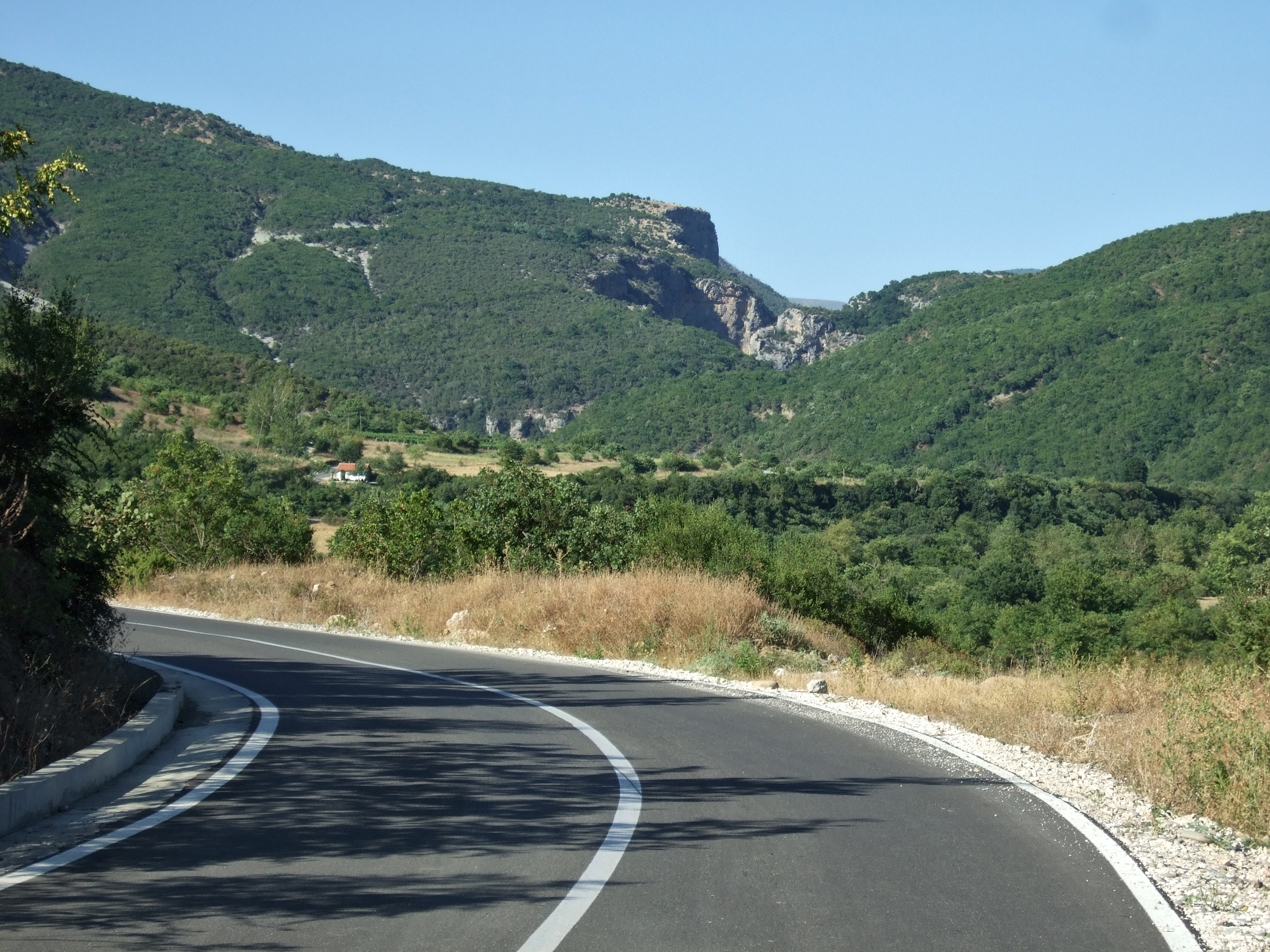
Lengarica Canyon on Fir of Hotova National Park

Due to its favorable ecological conditions and the mosaic distribution of various types of habitats, it is characterized by exceptionally rich and varied fauna. The forests are the most important habitats for mammals like wild cat, roe deer, wild boar, red squirrel, eurasian otter and badger. Brown bear, gray wolf and red fox can also be seen on the pastures deep inside the forest. The old growing trees throughout the park preserves a wide variety of bird species. Most notable amongst them are the golden eagle, eagle owl, barn owl, sparrowhawk, egyptian vulture, kestrel, lanner falcon and so on.

== Attractions ==
- Frashëri Brothers Tower House and Museum in Frashër, reconstructed in the 1970s by the Albanian government. The museum features documents, photographs, and sculptures on the Frashëri Brothers family history and their contribution to the Albanian Renaissance.
- Langarica Canyon perfect for rafting
- Katiu Ottoman Bridge and Benja Thermal Waters

As elsewhere in Albania, this national park is being threatened by the construction of hydroelectric dams along the Langarica Canyon. Environmentalists are challenging such activity by holding protests in Tirana as works are underway in the affected area which could damage ecosystems and the livelihood of those catering to the tourism industry.

== See also ==
- Geography of Albania
- Protected areas of Albania
- Rock formations in Albania
