= Nemërçka =

Mountain chain in Albania

- Dousko
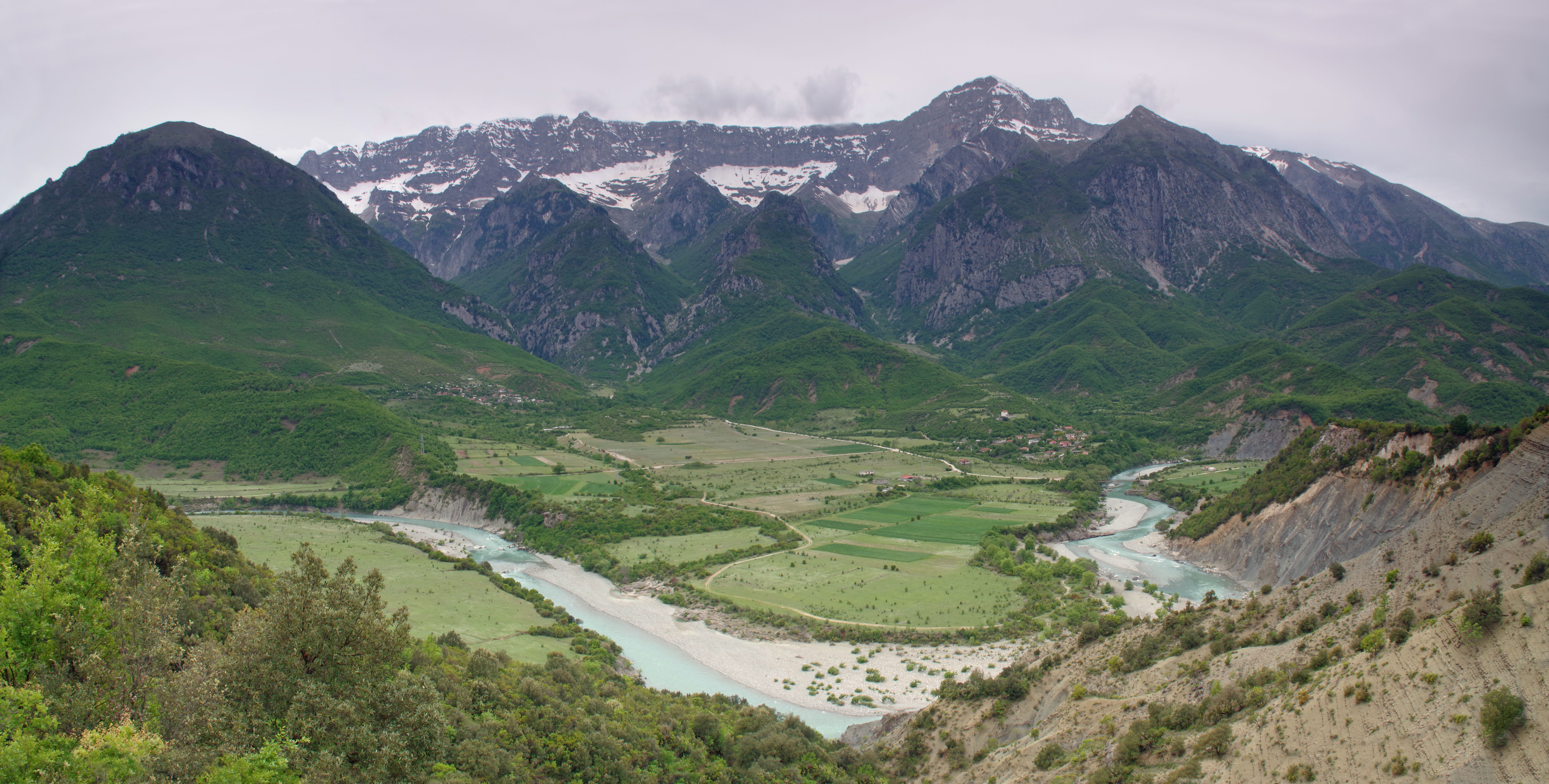
- View of the Nemërçka chain

Highest point
- Elevation: 2,482 m (8,143 ft)
- Prominence: 1,797 m (5,896 ft)
- Isolation: 33.2 km (20.6 mi)
- Listing: Ultra-prominent
- Coordinates: 40°07′24″N 20°25′57″E

Geography
- Location within Albania Location within Greece
- Countries: Albania; Greece
- Region: Southern Mountain Region
- Municipality: Përmet, Gjirokastër
- Parent range: Trebeshinë-Dhëmbel–Nemërçkë

Geology
- Rock age(s): Mesozoic, Paleogene
- Mountain type: massif
- Rock type: limestone

Nemërçka (Albanian: Nemërçkë, Greek: Νεμέρτσικα, Δούσκο, Μερόπη, Αεροπός, romanized: Nemértsika, Doúsko, Merópi, Aeropós) is a massif situated along the boundary between Gjirokastër and Përmet municipalities, in southern Albania and northern Greece. Part of the Trebeshinë-Dhëmbel-Nemërçkë mountain range, its highest peak, Papingu, reaches a height of 2,482 m (8,143 ft), making it the highest peak in the Southern Mountain Region. Other notable peaks include Maja e Gatakut 2,269 m (7,444 ft), Maja e Qesarit 2,253 m (7,392 ft), Maja e Poliçanit 2,138 m (7,014 ft), etc.

The massif extends about 20 km (12 mi) from Qafa e Dhëmbelit in the north to the state border with Greece in the south, stretching at a width of 4–10 km (2.5–6.2 mi).

== Geology ==
Composed primarily of Mesozoic and Paleogene limestones, Nemërçka features a heavily karstified ridge, formed by an elongated anticlinal structure, embanking the graben valley of Vjosë. The eastern slope descends steeply, often presenting as cliffs that are impassable, while the western slope is more gradual.

Quaternary glaciations have left visible traces in the relief pattern, manifesting as cirques on the eastern slope, above 1,700 m (5,600 ft), where large amounts of snow accumulates. From these heights, numerous rapid streams emerge, such as the Kazan and Draçovë streams. Snow blankets the chain from November to April and avalanches are frequent on the western slope.

== Biodiversity ==
Vegetation mainly consists of shrubs and a limited distribution of conifers. Forests are scarce. Summer pastures are plentiful throughout the mountain ridge and the western slope.

A diverse species of wildlife inhabit the area, namely the mountain partridge, wild turkey, wild goat, wild boar, and others.

== See also ==
- Geography of Albania
- List of mountains in Albania
- Geography of Greece
- List of mountains in Greece
