= Southern Mountain Region (Albania) =

Geographical region of Albania

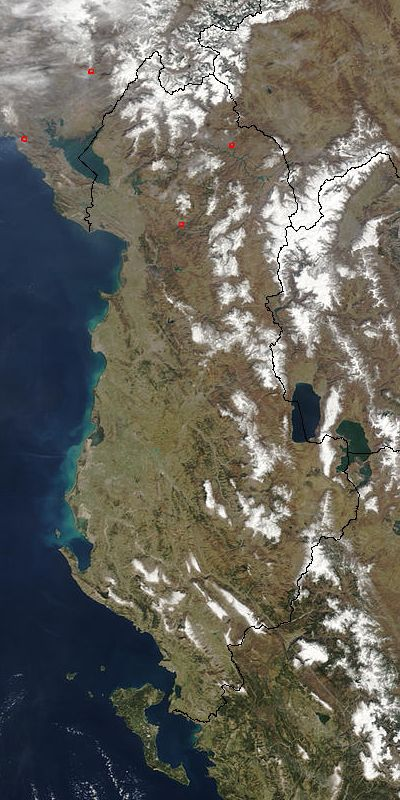
Topographical map of Albania

The Southern Mountain Region (Albanian: Krahina Malore Jugore) is a physiogeographical region in southern Albania. It is defined by high mountains and few valleys and plains between them. It is also one of the four geographical areas of Albania, the others being the Northern Mountain Range (the Albanian part of the Accursed Mountains), the Western Lowlands (Albanian: Ultësira Bregdetare), and the Central Mountain Range (Albanian: Krahina Malore Qendrore).

The range notably includes two mountain chains: the Trebeshinë-Dhëmbel-Nemërçkë and Shëndelli-Lunxhëri-Bureto. It also includes the Tomorr in its northern part, and the Ceraunian Mountains with its summit Çika in the west, two mountains which are close to the Llogara National Park. The mountainous region of Kurvelesh is part of the range, while its coastal region is part of the Albanian riviera. The only notable plain in the region is the Vurg plain. The mean precipitation for November through January is 1,000 mm.

== Nemërçkë Mountains ==
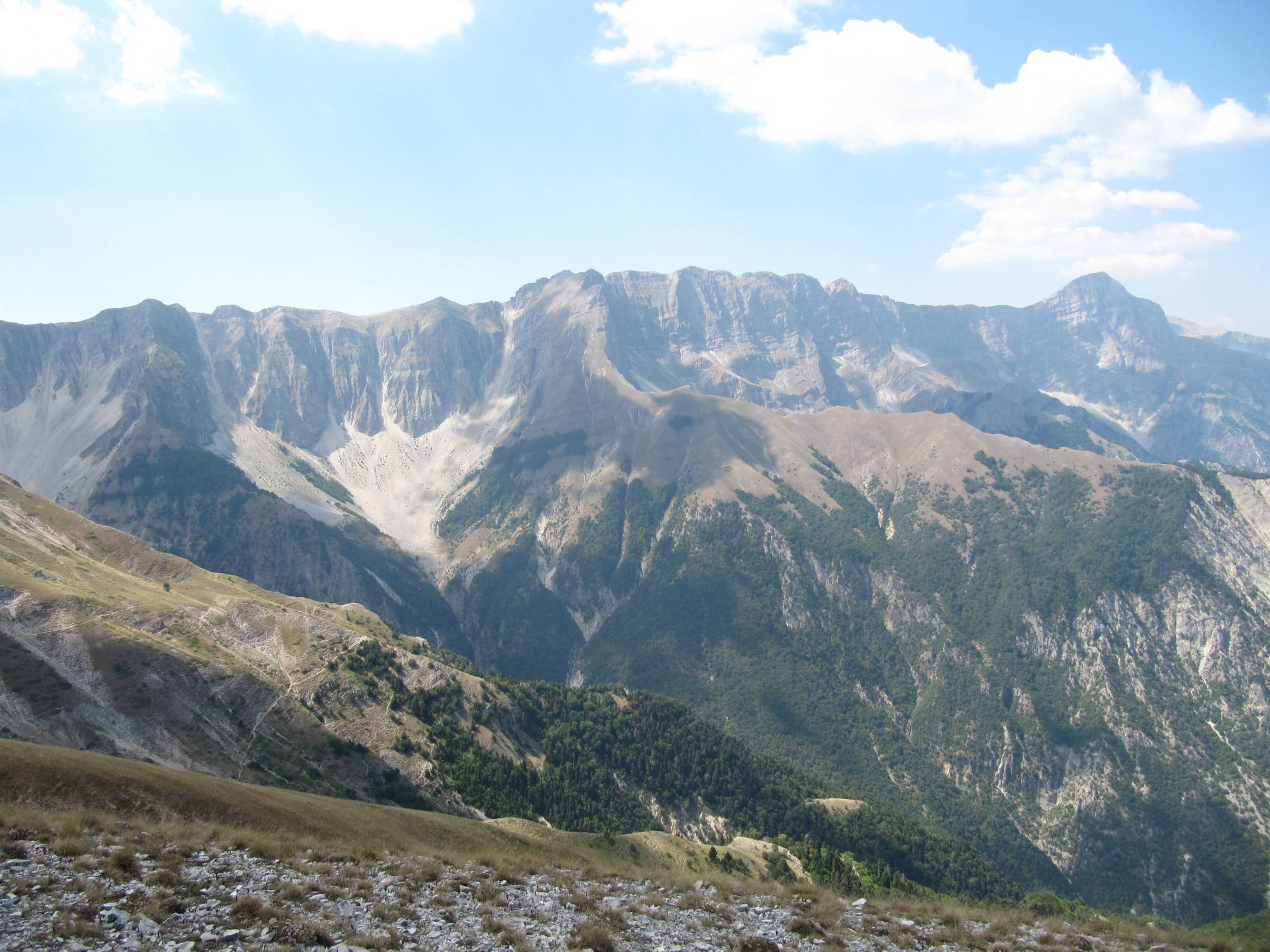
A southern view of Nemërçka.

Nemërçkë is a short mountain range in southern Albania on the border between Albania and Greece, which extends from the north-west to the south-east. To the north Nemërçkë is separated from the Albanian Pindus mountains, by the Vjosë river, Albania's second longest river, while to the south it reaches the Albanian-Greek border. Vjosë flows to the east of the mountains. Some of northern part of the range, which is also the highest one, is protected by the Fir of Hotova National Park.

In geomorphological terms, the Nemërçkes are part of the Nemërçka massif. The summit of the mountain range, Maja e Papingut is the highest peak. Having an elevation of 2,482 m (8,143 ft) and a prominence of 1,792 m (5,879 ft), it is the 44th most prominent mountain peak in Europe. The mountain is very steep and is characterized by its steep cliffs, which falls impressively on the Vjosë. Other peaks include Maja e Gatakut 2,269 m (7,444 ft), Maja e Qesarit 2,253 m (7,392 ft), and Maja e Poliçanit 2,138 m (7,014 ft).
