= Përmet =

City in Albania

- Municipality
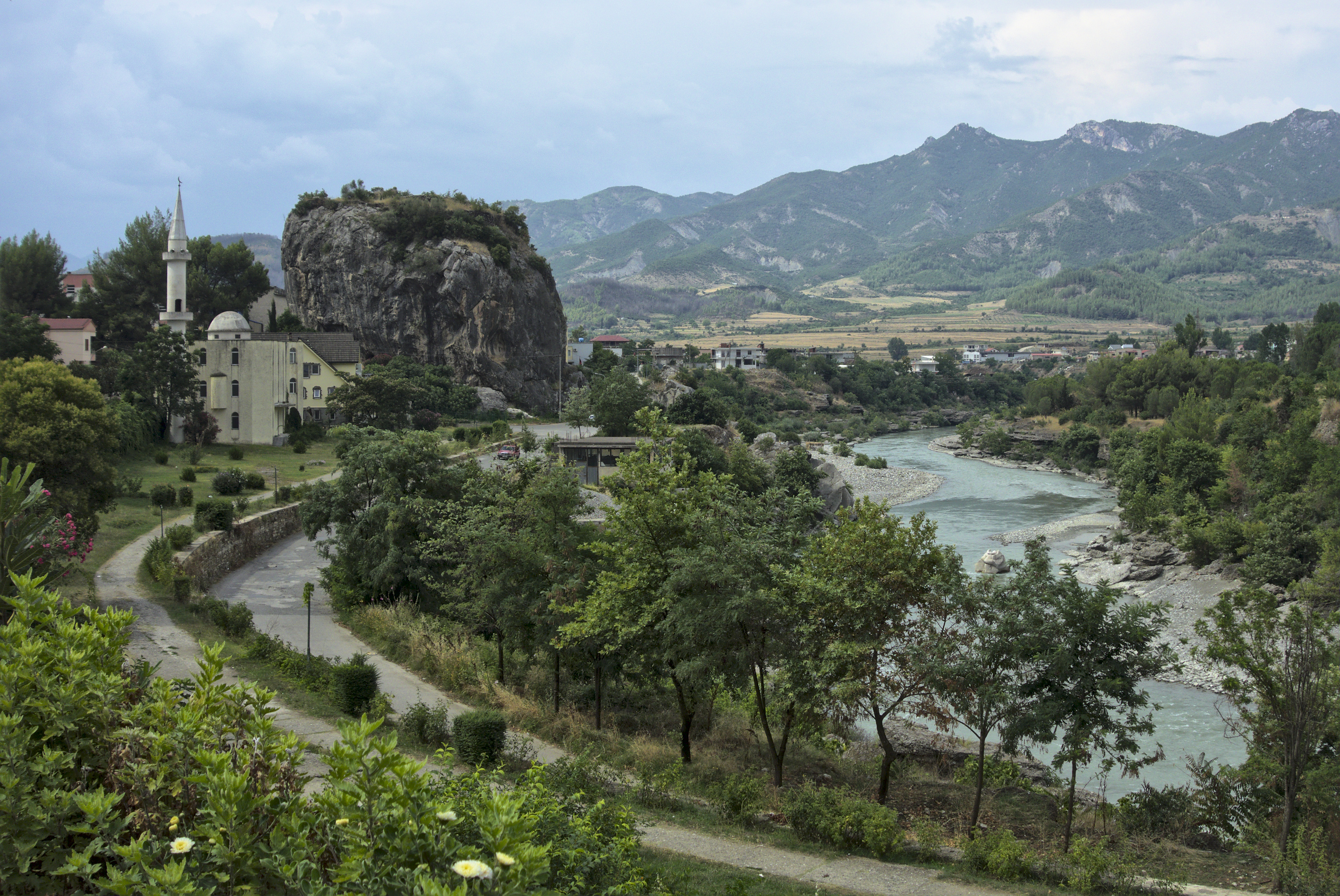
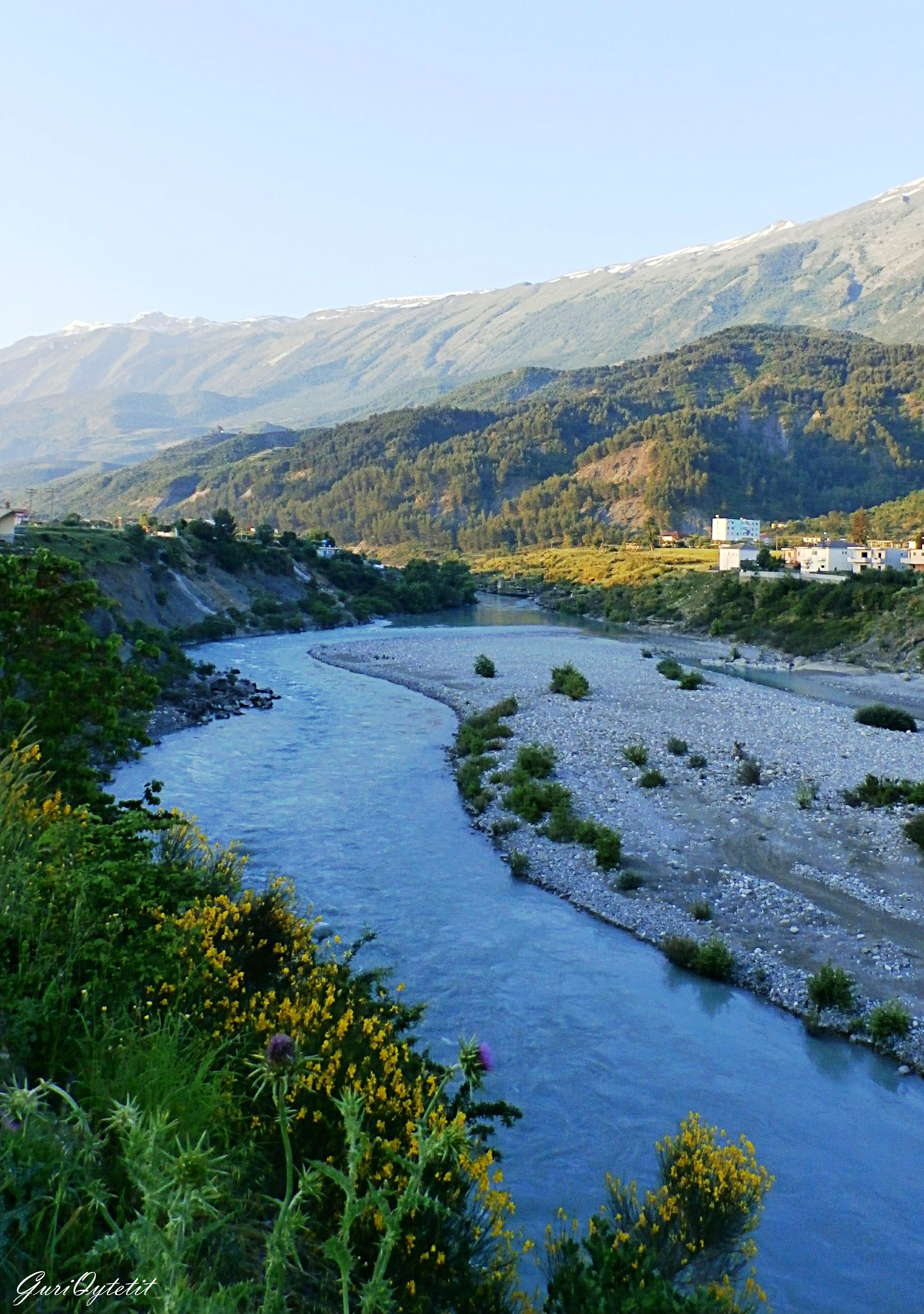
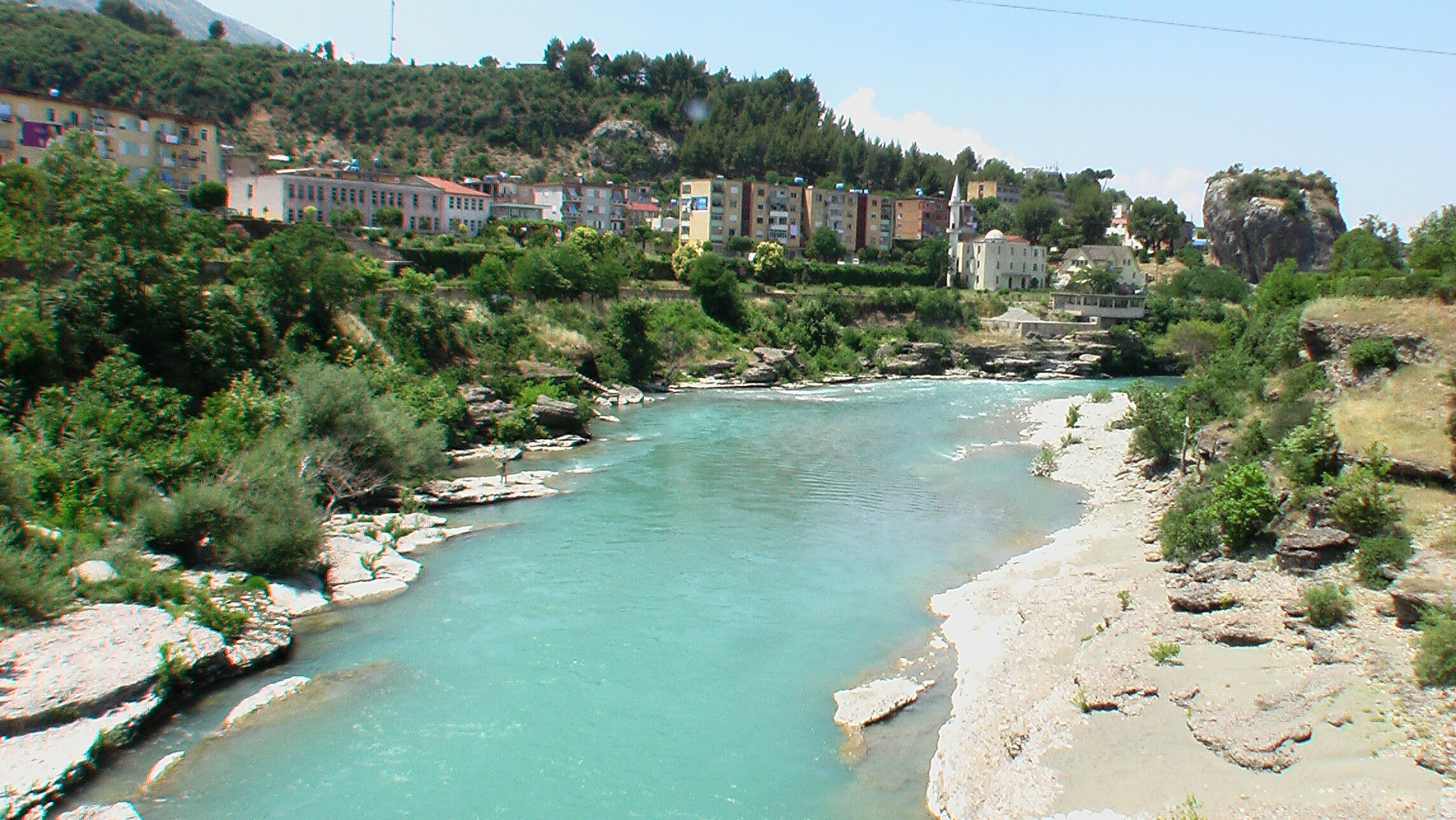
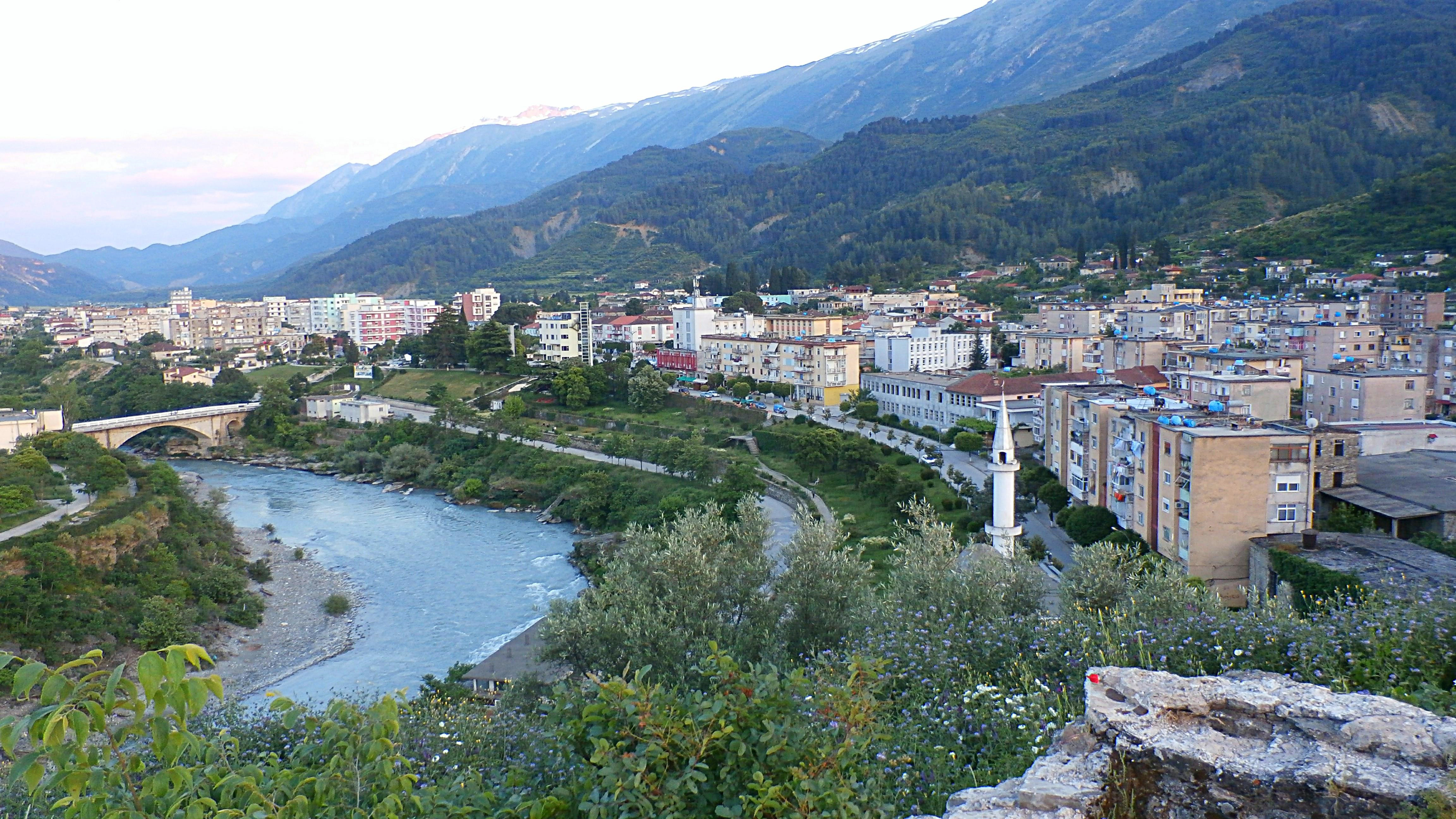

- Emblem

- Location within Albania
- Coordinates: 40°14′N 20°21′E
- Country: Albania
- County: Gjirokastër

Government
  - Mayor: Alma Hoxha (PS)

Area
  - Municipality: 602.47 km^{2} (232.61 sq mi)

Population (2023)
  - Municipality: 7,980
  - Municipality density: 13.2/km^{2} (34.3/sq mi)
  - Administrative unit: 4,809
- Demonym(s): Albanian: Përmetar (m), Përmetare (f)
- Time zone: UTC+1 (CET)
  - Summer (DST): UTC+2 (CEST)
- Postal Code: 6401
- Area Code: (0)813
- Website: bashkiapermet.gov.al

Përmet (Albanian: [pəɾˈmɛt]) is a town and municipality in Gjirokastër County, southern Albania. The municipality of Përmet consists of the administrative units of Çarçovë, Frashër, Petran, Qendër Piskovë and Përmet. The total population is 7,980 as of 2023, (Note: The population of the municipality results from the sum of the listed administrative units in the former as of the 2011 Albanian census.) in a total area of 602.47 km^{2}. The population of the municipal unit at the 2023 census was 4,809. It is flanked by the Vjosë river, which runs along the Trebeshinë-Dhëmbel-Nemërçkë mountain chain, between Trebeshinë and Dhëmbel mountains, and through the Këlcyrë Gorge. Key highlights for travelers include rafting, nature and wildlife tours, kayaking, hiking, and extreme sports.

== Name ==
The town itself is known in Albanian as Përmet. The placename is derived from the Albanian dialectal expression përm eti, stemming from prenetjen, meaning 'quench thirst', as local streams were used as water sources by people travelling the Vjosa river valley. The town is known in Italian as Permet, Aromanian as Pãrmeti, in Greek as Πρεμετή/Premeti and in Turkish as Permedi.

== History ==
=== 14th century ===
In 14th century Përmet came under Ottoman rule and became first a kaza of the sanjak of Gjirokastër and later of the Sanjak of Ioannina.

=== 18th century ===
During the era of conversions to Islam in the 18th century, Christian Albanian speaking areas such as the region of Rrëzë strongly resisted those efforts, in particular the village of Hormovë and the town of Përmet.

In 1778, a Greek school was established and financed by the local Orthodox Church and the diaspora of the town.

=== 19th century ===
After a successful revolt in 1833 the Ottoman Empire replaced Ottoman officials in the town with local Albanian ones and proclaimed a general amnesty for all those who had been involved in the uprising. The artisans of the kaza of Përmet held the monopoly in the trade of opinga in the vilayets of Shkodër and Janina until 1841, when that privilege was revoked under the Tanzimat reforms. In 1882 Greek education was expanded with the foundation of a Greek girls' school subsidized by members of the local diaspora that lived in Constantinople, as well as the Greek national benefactor, Konstantinos Zappas. The first Albanian-language school of the town was founded in the beginning of 1890 by Llukë Papavrami, a teacher from Hotovë, who had the endorsement of Naim Frasheri. A great contribution for the Albanian school was given by philanthropists Mihal Kerbici, Pano Duro and Stathaq Duka. Duro and Kerbici financed until 1896 the salaries of five teachers, whereas Stathaq Duka bequeathed in 1886 scholarships for studies in the schools of Jurisprudence and Medicine.

=== 20th century and modern day ===
In 1909 during the Second Constitutional Era the authorities allowed Albanian language to be taught in the local madrasah. It was a kaza centre as "Premedi" in Ergiri sanjak of Yanya Vilayet till 1912.

During the Albanian Revolt of 1912 the Albanian revolutionary leaders Menduh Zavalani and Spiro Bellkameni, alongside Nexhip Bënja and Servet Frashëri, officially evicted the Ottoman kaymakam and freed Përmet from Ottoman control on 14 August. Later in 1912, during the First Balkan War the population founded a committee that had as its goal the organization of the local resistance with help from government of Vlora and chetas operating across Southern Albania. In a 28 December rally through the town centre people of Permet agreed they must fight where the nation most needed. In February 1913, units of the advancing 3rd Division of the Greek Army entered the town while the resistance of the local population was not sufficient because it was poorly armed. In 1914, Përmet became part of the Autonomous Republic of Northern Epirus, which then was annexed back to the Albanian state.

During the Greco-Italian War, on December 4, 1940, the town came under the control of the advancing forces of the Greek II Army Corps. Përmet returned to Axis control in April 1941. In May 1944 the National Liberation Movement held in the town the congress, which elected the provisional government of Albania.

In August 2013, demonstrations took place by the local Orthodox community as a result of the confiscation of the Cathedral of the Assumption of the Virgin and the forcible removal of the clergy and of religious artifacts from the temple, by the state authorities. The Cathedral was allegedly not fully returned to the Orthodox Autocephalous Church of Albania after the restoration of Democracy in the country. The incident provoked reactions by the Orthodox Church of Albania and also triggered diplomatic intervention from Greece.

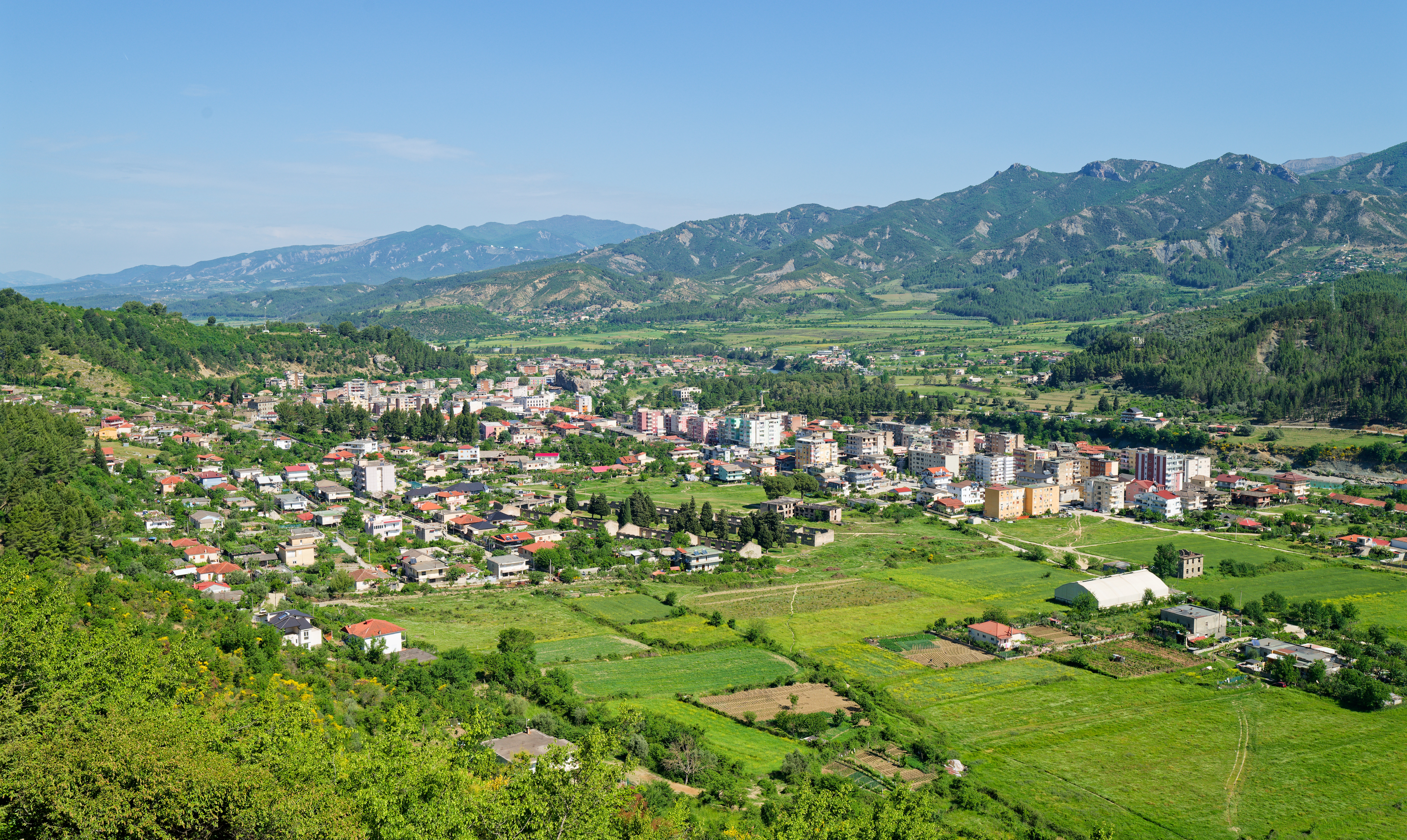
Panorama of Përmet

== Demography ==
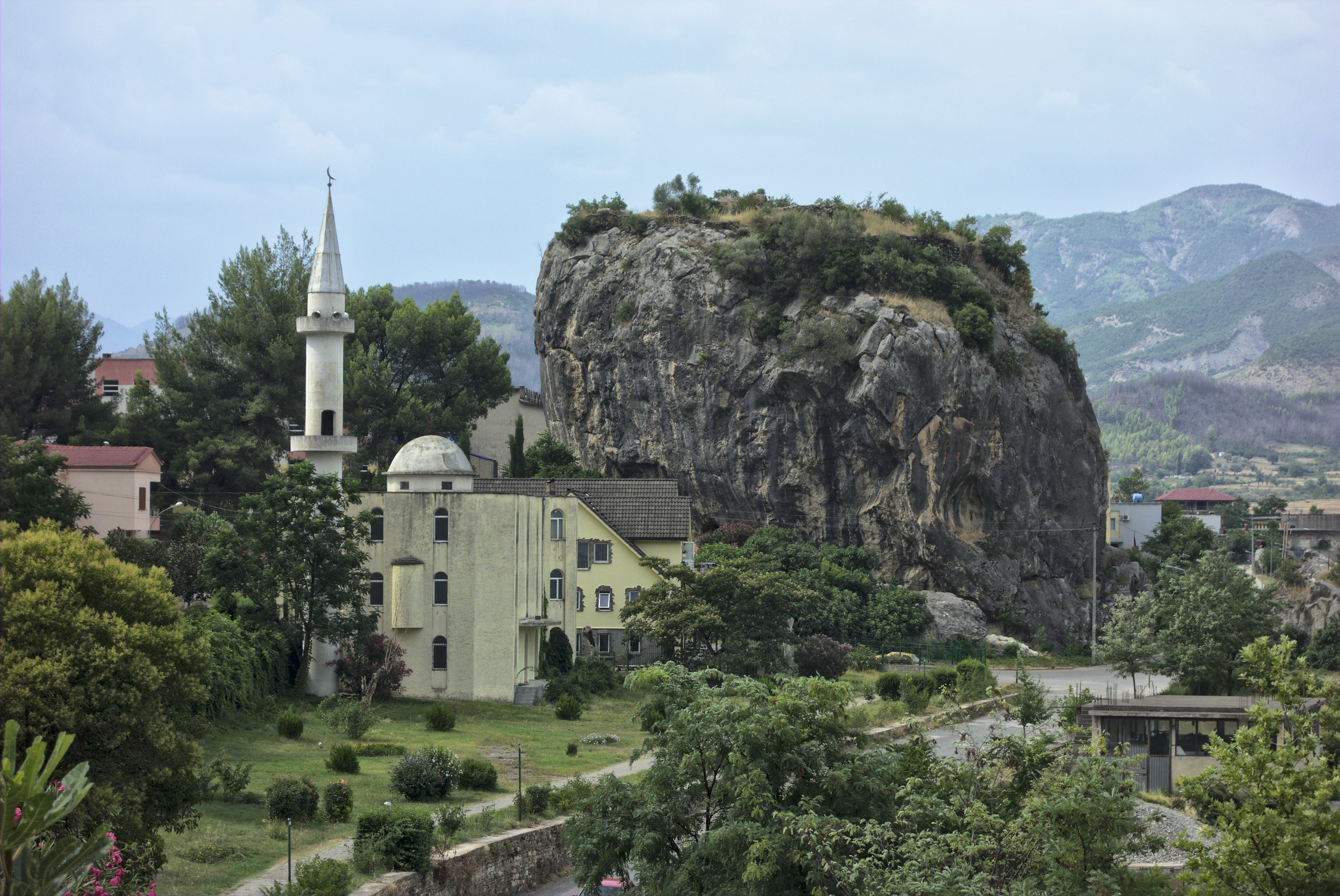
The stone of the city and the mosque

Historical population
Year	Pop.	±%
1950	1,918	—
1960	3,391	+76.8%
1969	4,300	+26.8%
1979	5,300	+23.3%
1989	7,313	+38.0%
2001	7,726	+5.6%
2011	5,945	−23.1%
2023	4,809	−19.1%

The total population is 7,980 as of the 2023 census. The population of the former municipality at the 2011 census was 4,809.

=== History ===
- 1930: Përmet had 1,000 houses, 300 shops, was an important regional trade centre and its population was Muslim.

=== Modern ===
In Përmet, apart from Muslim and Christian Albanian communities, Greeks and Aromanians are also found in a number of neighbourhoods.

== Culture ==
Përmet is known for its cuisine, particularly the many different types of jam (reçel) and kompot (komposto), and the production of local wine and raki.

=== Sports ===
Përmet is also home to the football club SK Përmeti and basketball club KB Përmeti.

== Municipal Council ==
Seat distribution in the Municipal Council

Following the 2023 local elections, the composition of the Council of Përmet is as follows:

Name	Abbr.	Seats
Socialist Party of Albania; Partia Socialiste e Shqipërisë	PS	9
Social Democratic Party of Albania; Partia Socialdemokrate e Shqipërisë	PDS	2
Democratic Party of Albania; Partia Demokratike e Shqipërisë	PD	1
Together We Win; Bashkë Fitojmë	BF	1
Legality Movement Party; Lëvizja e Legalitetit	PLL	1
Party of the Vlachs of Albania; Partia e Vllehëve të Shqipërisë	PV	1

== Notable people ==
- Kamber Ali, 3rd Dedebaba of the Bektashi Order
- Laver Bariu, clarinetist
- Ilirjan Çaushaj, footballer
- Saint Christos the Arvanid, Albanian saint
- Abdyl Frashëri, Albanian politician and national hero
- Dalip Frashëri, 19th-century poet
- Mehdi Frashëri, former Prime Minister of Albania
- Mid'hat Frashëri, Albanian politician, diplomat, and intellectual
- Naim Frashëri, Albanian national poet and national hero
- Sami Frashëri, Albanian writer and national hero
- Shahin Frashëri, 19th-century poet
- Abaz Hilmi, 5th Dedebaba of the Bektashi Order
- Vasileios Ioannidis, Greek theologian and professor
- Dhimitër Kacimbra, Albanian politician
- Ervis Kaja, footballer
- Antoneta Papapavli, actress
- Odhise Paskali, sculptor and People's Artist of Albania
- Turhan Përmeti, politician and former Prime Minister of Albania
- Stefanaq Pollo, historian
- Edison Qafa, footballer
- Simon Stefani, politician
- Mentor Xhemali, singer
- Mihal Zallari, Chairman of the Assembly of Albania, historian, and journalist
- Fehim Zavalani, Albanian journalist
- Aqif Përmeti, military officer and former Minister of Defence of Albania

== See also ==
- List of mayors of Përmet
- Fir of Hotova National Park

== Sources ==
- Lauria, Antonio; Flora, Valbona; Guza, Kamela (27 December 2020). Five Albanian Villages: guidelines for a Sustainable Tourism Development through the Enhancement of the Cultural Heritage (PDF). Firenze University Press. ISBN 978-88-5518-174-7. Archived (PDF) from the original on 21 November 2021.
- Blocal, Giulia (5 October 2014). "Përmet and the Balkan side of Albania". Blocal Travel blog.
- History of the Albanian people II 1830–1912. Academy of Sciences of Albania. 2002.
