= Architecture of Albania =

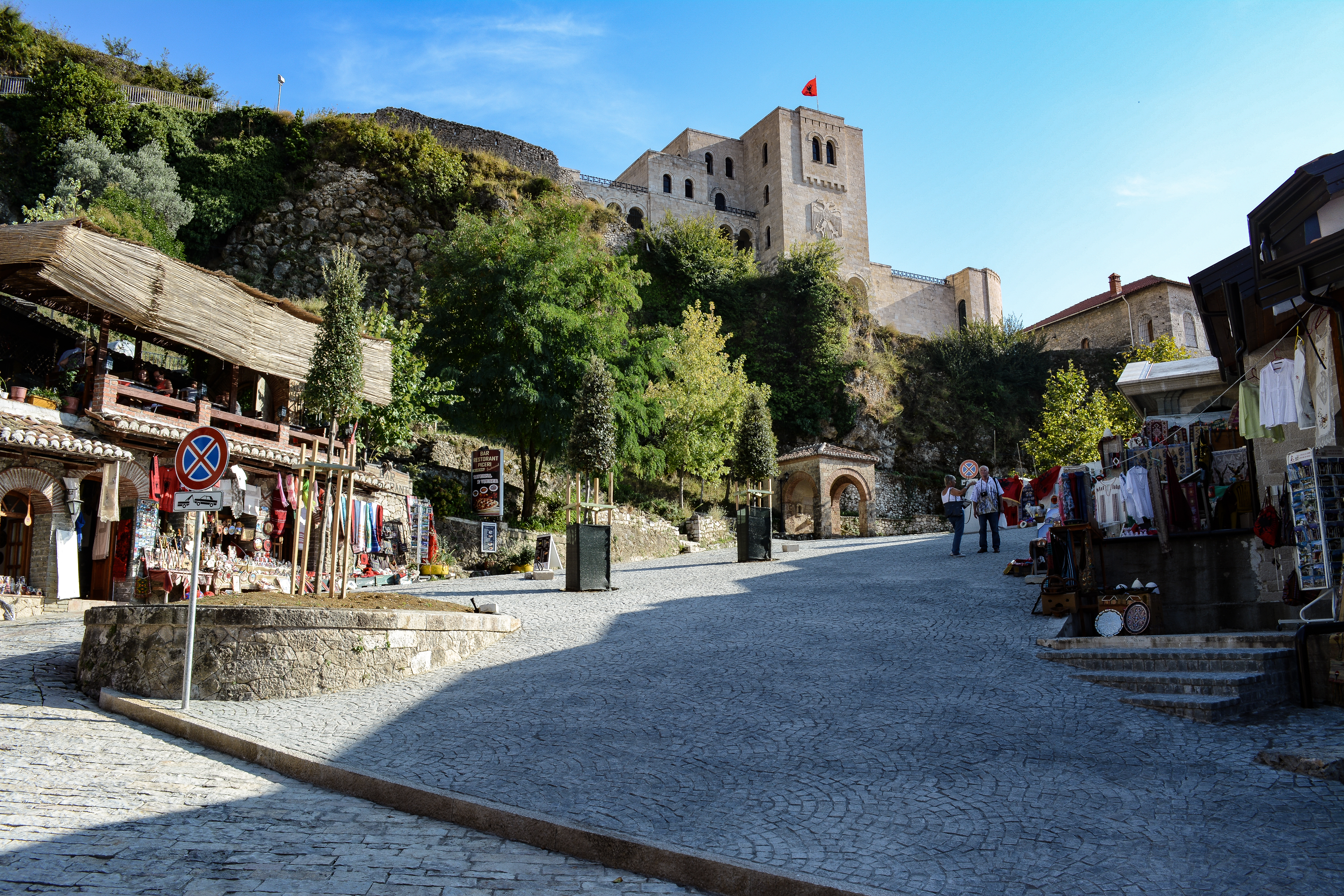
Medieval architecture in Krujë.

The architecture of Albania (Albanian: Arkitektura e Shqipërisë [aɾkitɛkˈtuɾa ɛ ʃcipəˈɾisə]) is a reflection of Albania's historical and cultural heritage. The country's architecture was influenced by its location within the Mediterranean Basin and progressed over the course of history as it was once inhabited by numerous civilisations including the Illyrians, Ancient Greeks, Romans, Byzantines, Venetians, Ottomans as well as modern Austro-Hungarians and Italians. In addition, missionaries, invaders, colonisers and traders brought cultural changes that had a large profound effect on building styles as well as techniques.

== Background ==
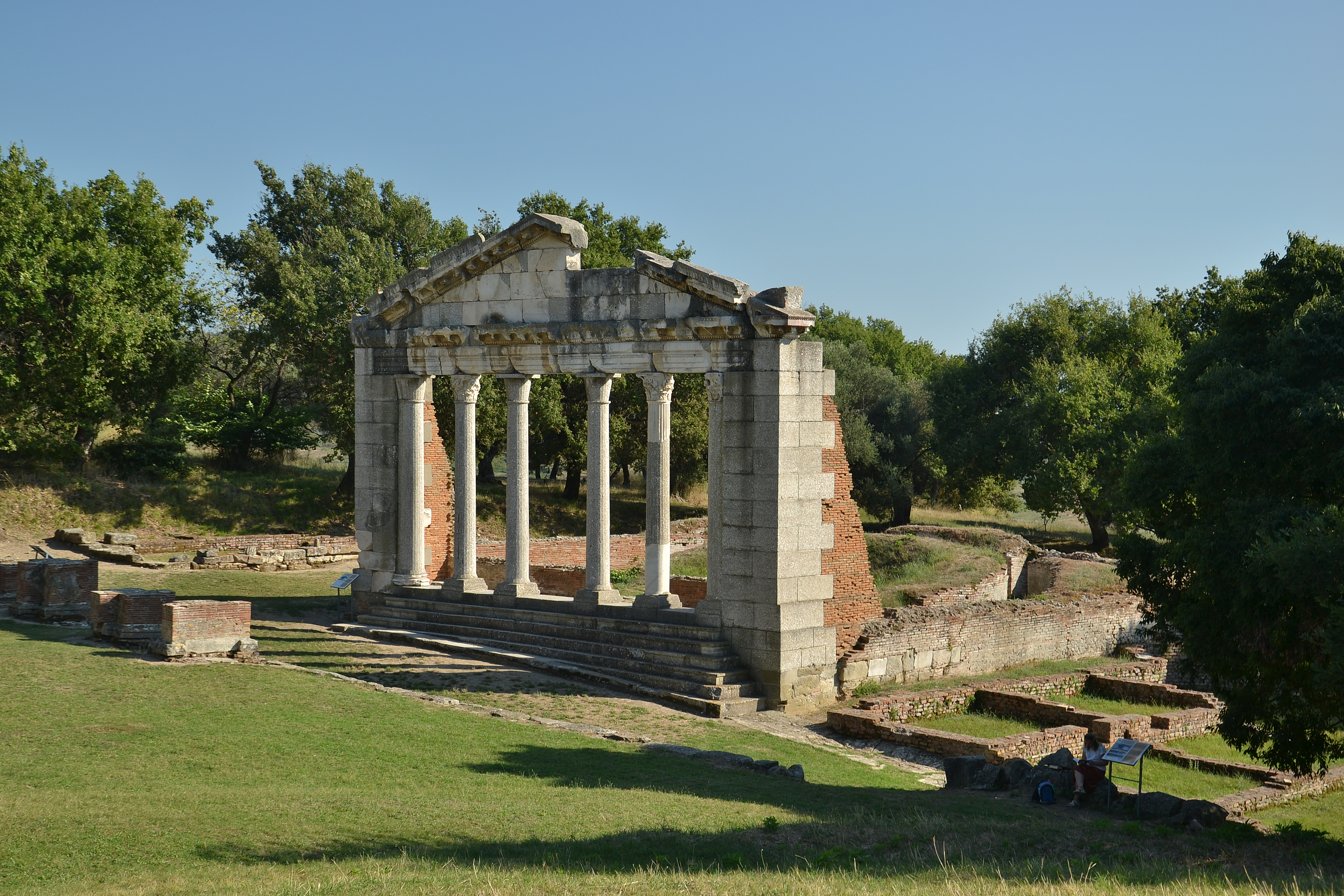
The "Monument to Agonothetes" was built in the 2nd century BC and functioned as Apollonia's municipal council meeting building in the Roman era

During classical antiquity, cities and towns in Albania have evolved from within the castle to include dwellings, religious and commercial structures, with constant redesigning of town squares and evolution of building techniques. Although there are prehistoric and classical structures in the country, which effectively begins with constructions from the Illyrians and Ancient Greeks such as in Byllis, Amantia, Phoenice, Apollonia, Butrint and Shkodër. With the extension of the Roman Empire in the Balkans, impressive Roman architecture was built throughout the country whereas it is best exemplified in Durrës, Tirana and Butrint.

After the fall of the Western Roman Empire, Albania became an integral part of the Byzantine Empire. They have left a legacy, most visible in the cities and surroundings of Korçë, Berat, Voskopojë and Gjirokastër, in the form of castles, churches and monasteries with grandiose wealth of visible murals and frescos. The country also has many surviving monuments from the Ottoman period. They left their mark with the many mosques and other buildings they constructed, that contributed to make Berat and Gjirokastër an UNESCO World Heritage Site.

In the 18th and 19th centuries, Albanian medieval towns underwent urban transformations by various Austro-Hungarian and Italian architects, giving them the appearance of western European cities; this can be particularly seen in Tirana and Korçë. They introduced architectural styles such as Historicism, Art Nouveau, Neo-Renaissance and Neoclassicism.

Following the establishment of communism in Albania, the country's architectural development was radically changed by socialist ideology, and numerous historic and sacred buildings across Albania were demolished. Many socialist-styled complexes, wide roads and factories were constructed, while squares in major towns were redesigned.

The United Nations Educational, Scientific and Cultural Organization (UNESCO) list of World Heritage Sites include currently two sites in Albania. These sites include the historic centres of Berat and Gjirokastër and Butrint. The Amphitheatre of Durrës, Royal Illyrian Tombs of Selcë e Poshtme, Archaeological site of Apollonia and Castle of Bashtova are inscribed on the country's tentative list.

The preservation and protection of cultural and historical heritage sites in Albania is entrusted to the Institute of Monuments of Albania, which were founded on 2 July 1965 by the Ministry of Culture.

== History ==
=== Prehistory ===
The beginnings of architecture in Albania dates back to the middle Neolithic Age with the discovery of prehistoric dwellings in Dunavec and Maliq. They were built on a wooden platform that rested on stakes stuck vertically into the soil. Prehistoric dwellings in Albania consist of three types such as houses enclosed either completely on the ground or half underground, both found in Cakran near Fier and houses constructed above ground.

=== Antiquity ===
==== Illyrians ====
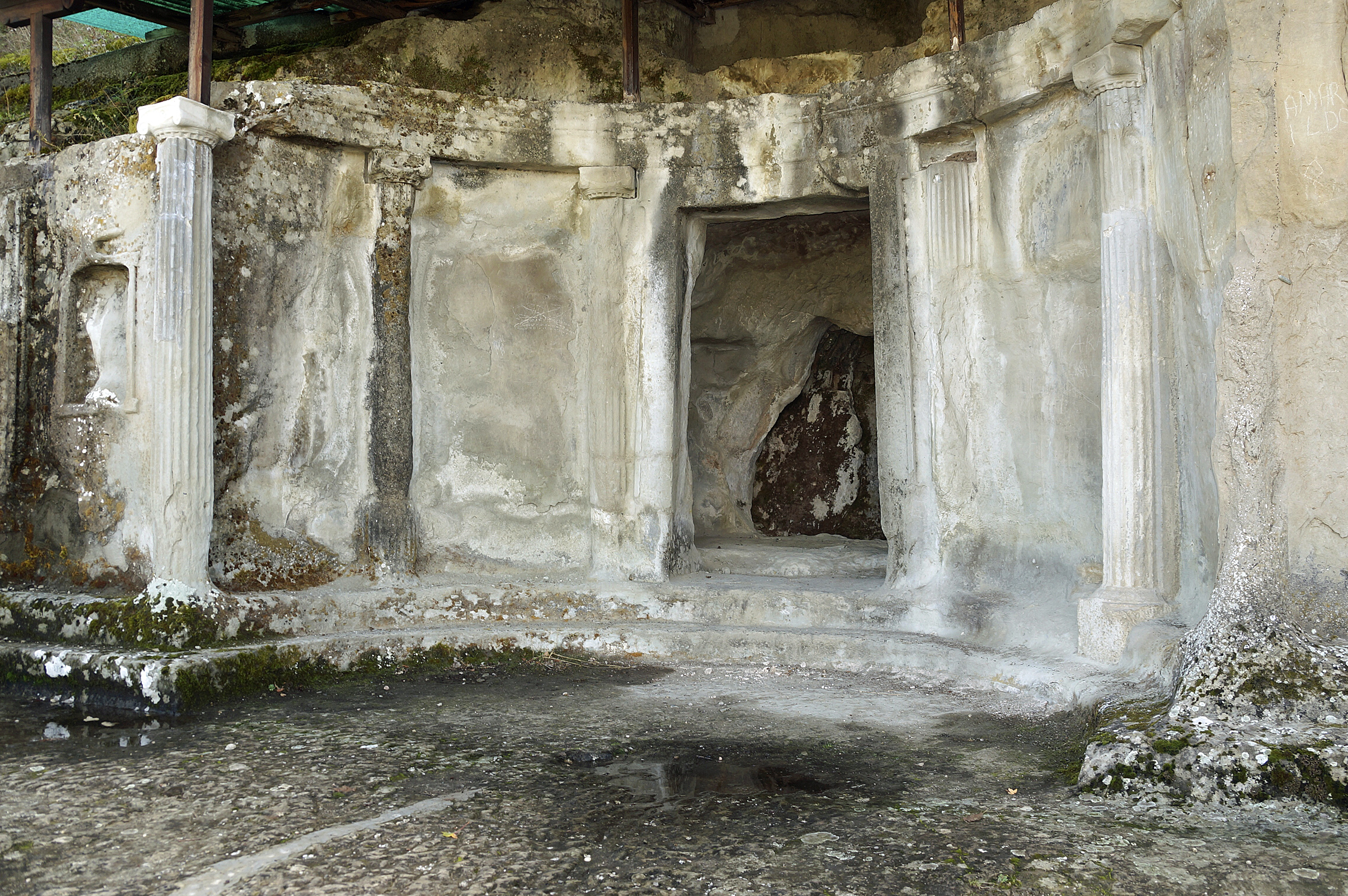
Tomb III of the royal Illyrian tombs of Selca e Poshtme, 2013.

During the Bronze Age, the Illyrians and Ancient Greeks started to organize itself in the territory of Albania. The Illyrians were an ethnic group with distinct culture and art, while it is believed that Albanians are the descendants of the Illyrians but no enough evidence is left to get a conclusion. Cities within Illyria were mainly built on the tops of high mountains surrounded by heavily fortified walls. Further, the history of Albania has not been kind to the Illyrian architectural monuments. Few monuments from the Illyrians are still preserved such as in Amantia, Antigonia, Byllis, Scodra, Lissus and Selca e Poshtme.

Following the Illyrian Wars, the architecture in Albania developed significantly in the 2nd century BC with the arrival of the Romans. The conquered settlements and villages such as Apollonia, Butrint, Byllis, Dyrrachium and Hadrianopolis were notably modernised following Roman models, with the building of a forum, roads, theatres, promenades, temples, aqueducts and other social buildings. The period also marks the construction of stadiums and thermal baths that were of social importance as places of gathering.

===== Amantia =====
Amantia was an ancient city and the main settlement of the Amantes, traditionally located in southern Illyria in classical antiquity. In Hellenistic times the city was either part of Illyria or Epirus. In Roman times it was included within Epirus Nova, in the province of Macedonia. The site has been identified with the village of Ploçë, Vlorë County, Albania. Amantia was designated as an archaeological park on 7 April 2003 by the government of Albania.

The massive walls of Amantia were built before the end of the 4th century BC, and literary sources report them as an Illyrian rather than Epirote or Macedonian foundation. Later Amantia acquired the trappings of a Hellenistic town. The time duration that passed before Illyrian cities were documented on a list of theorodokoi clarifies that acculturation did take place in southern Illyria; however, it indicates that the process was gradual.

Amantia occupied an important defensive position above the Aoos/Vjosë river valley to the east, and on the road to the coast and the Bay of Aulon. At the archaeological site of Ploçë, a temple dedicated to Aphrodite, a theatre, and a stadium have also been found.

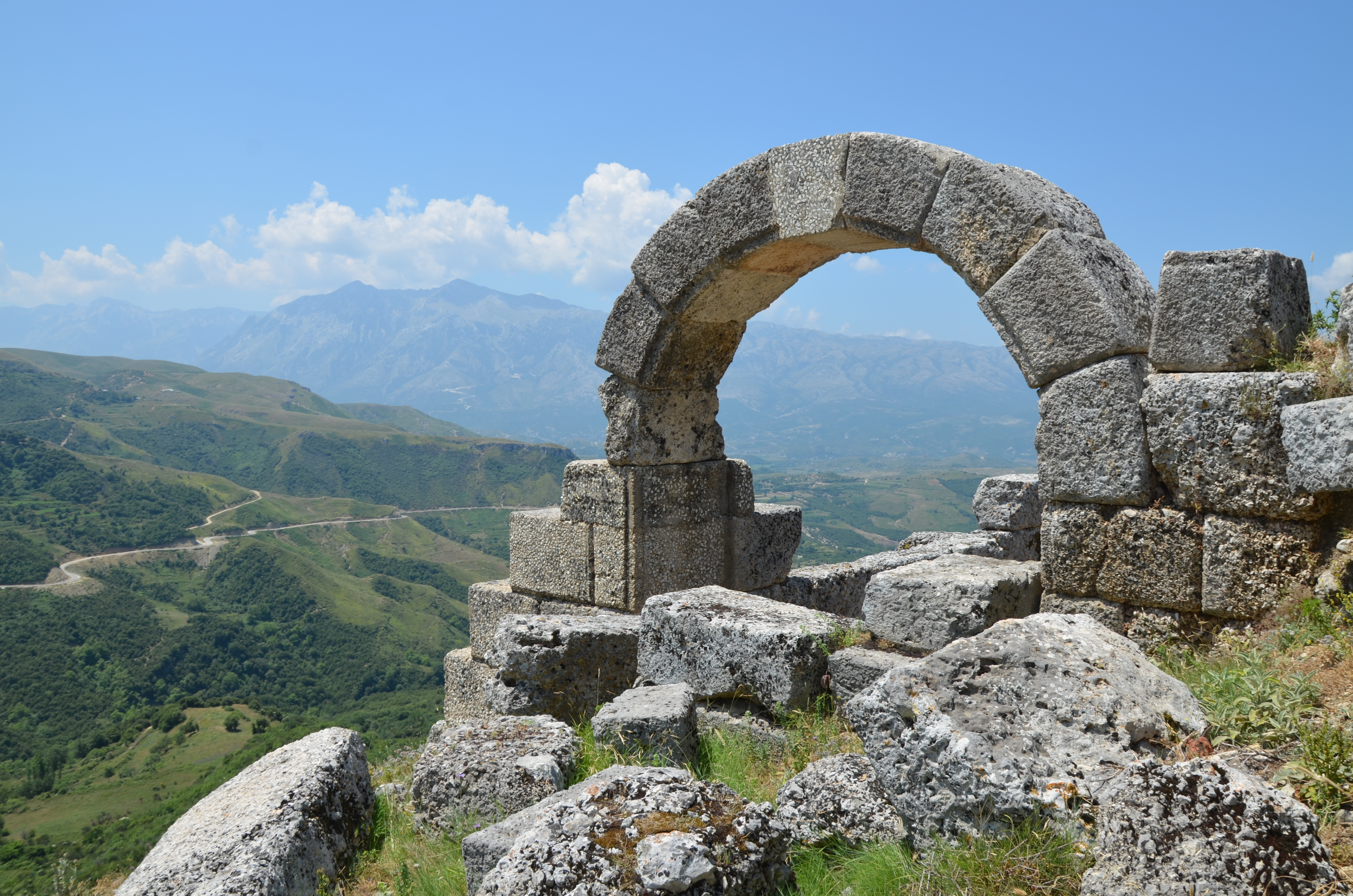
City Gates

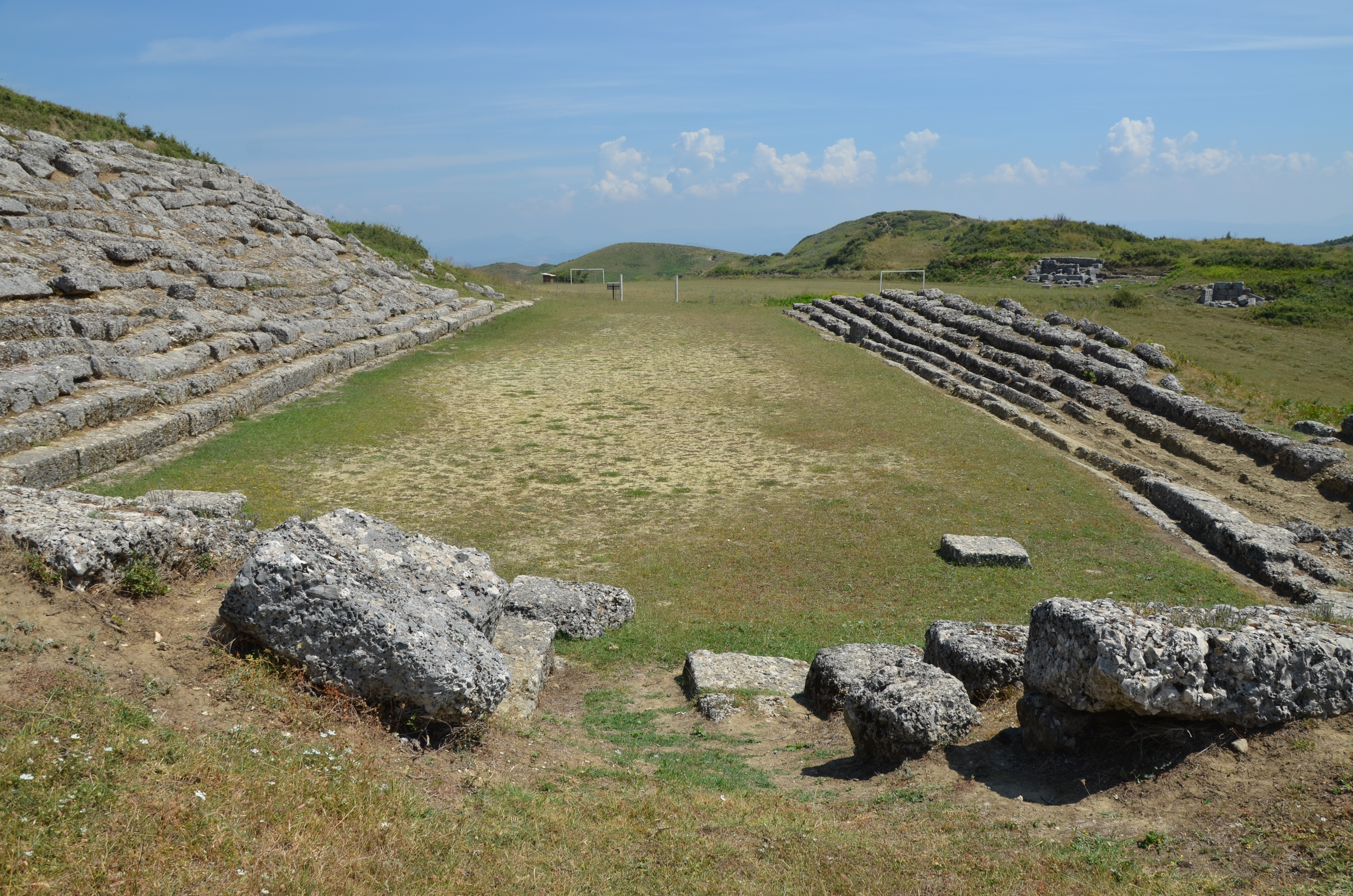
Stadium

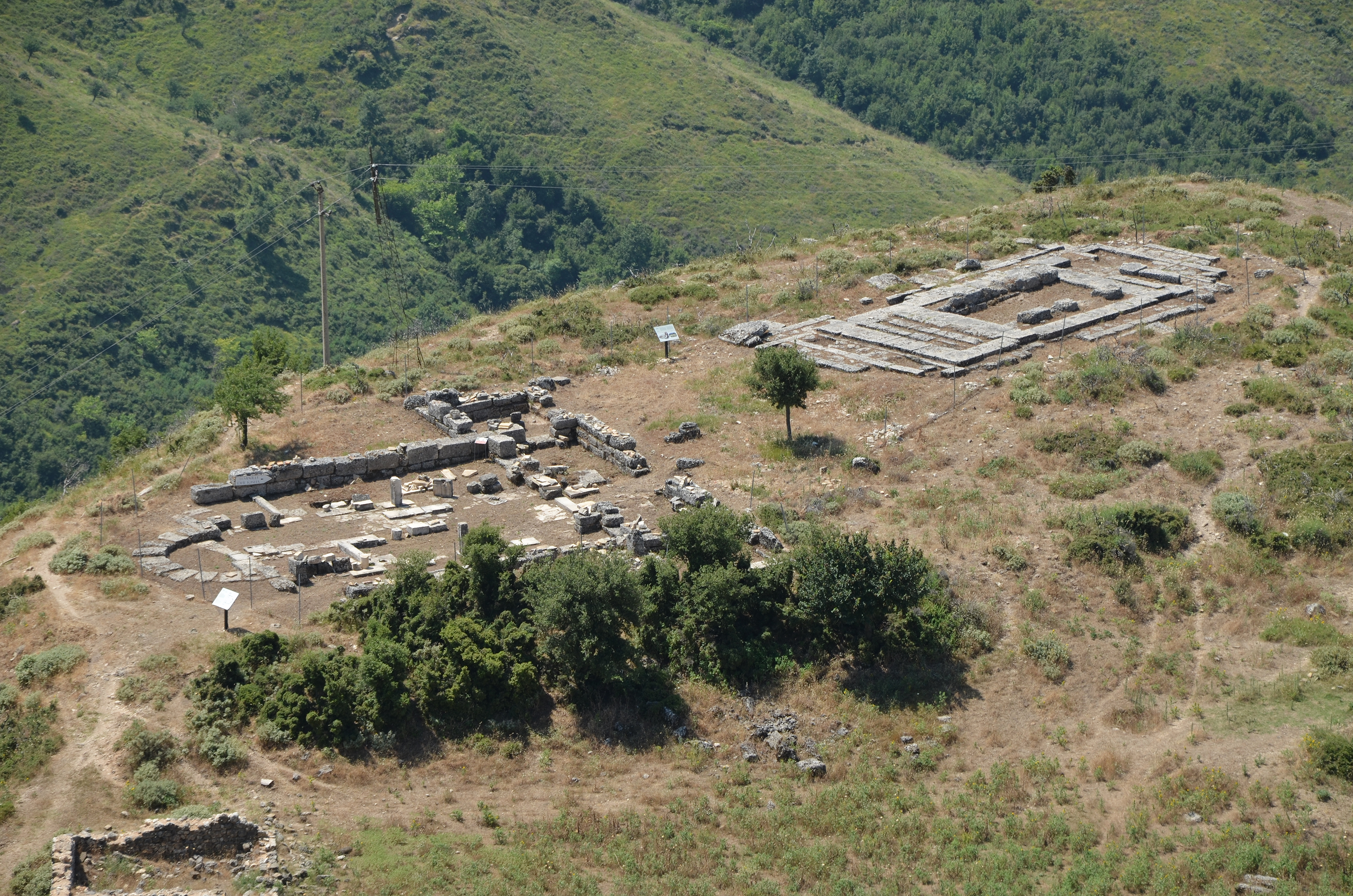
Acropolis

===== Byllis =====
Byllis was an ancient city and the chief settlement of the Illyrian tribe of the Bylliones, traditionally located in southern Illyria. In Hellenistic times the city was either part of Illyria or Epirus. In Roman times it was included within Epirus Nova, in the province of Macedonia. The remains of Byllis are situated north-east of Vlorë, 25 kilometers from the sea in Hekal, Fier County, Albania. Byllis was designated as an archaeological park on 7 April 2003 by the government of Albania.

The massive walls of Byllis were built around 350 BC when the Illyrians went through a dynamic development founding their own cities. The urban settlement was built on the territory of the community of the Bylliones on an already existent Illyrian hilltop proto-urban area dating back to the previous century. Later Byllis acquired the trappings of a Hellenistic town, and because the southernmost Illyrian tribes, including the Bylliones, were inclined to become bilingual, it was also a Greek-speaking city. Byllis received sacred ancient Greek envoys, known as theoroi, during the early 2nd century BC, which only cities that were considered Greek were eligible to receive. The time duration that passed before Illyrian cities were documented on a list of theorodokoi clarifies that acculturation did take place in southern Illyria, however it indicates that the process was gradual.

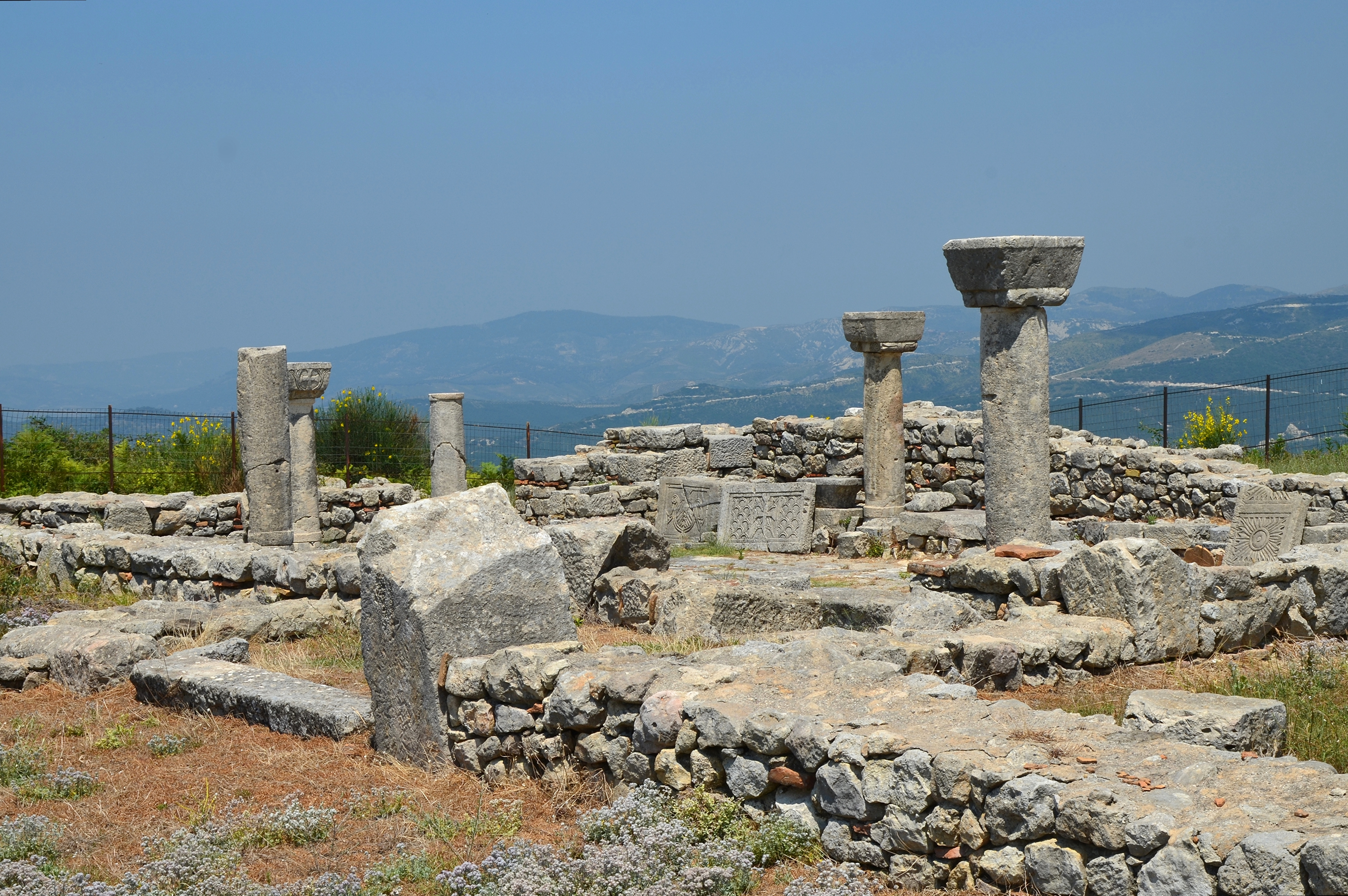
Remains of the Basilica

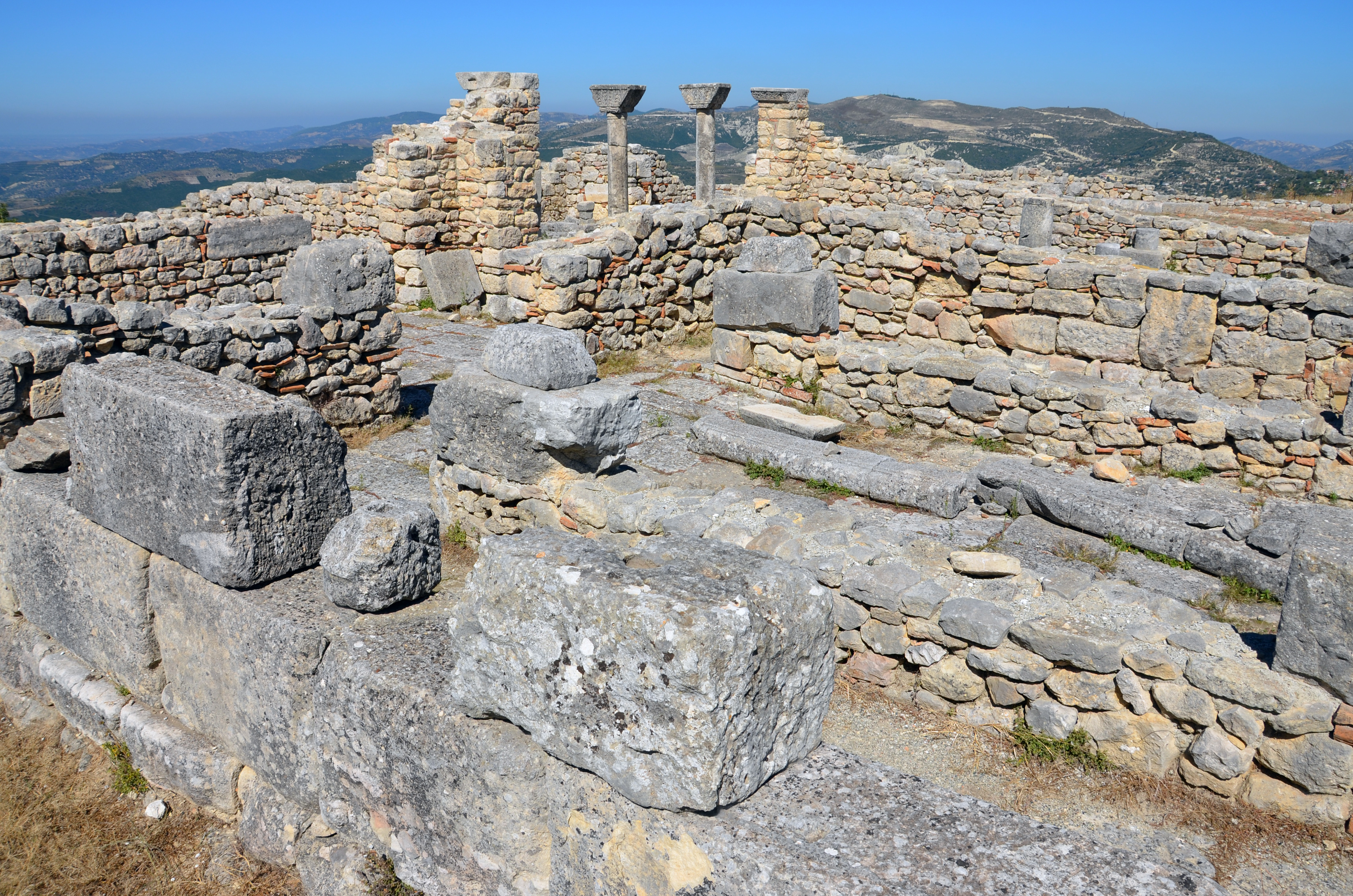
Episcopal building

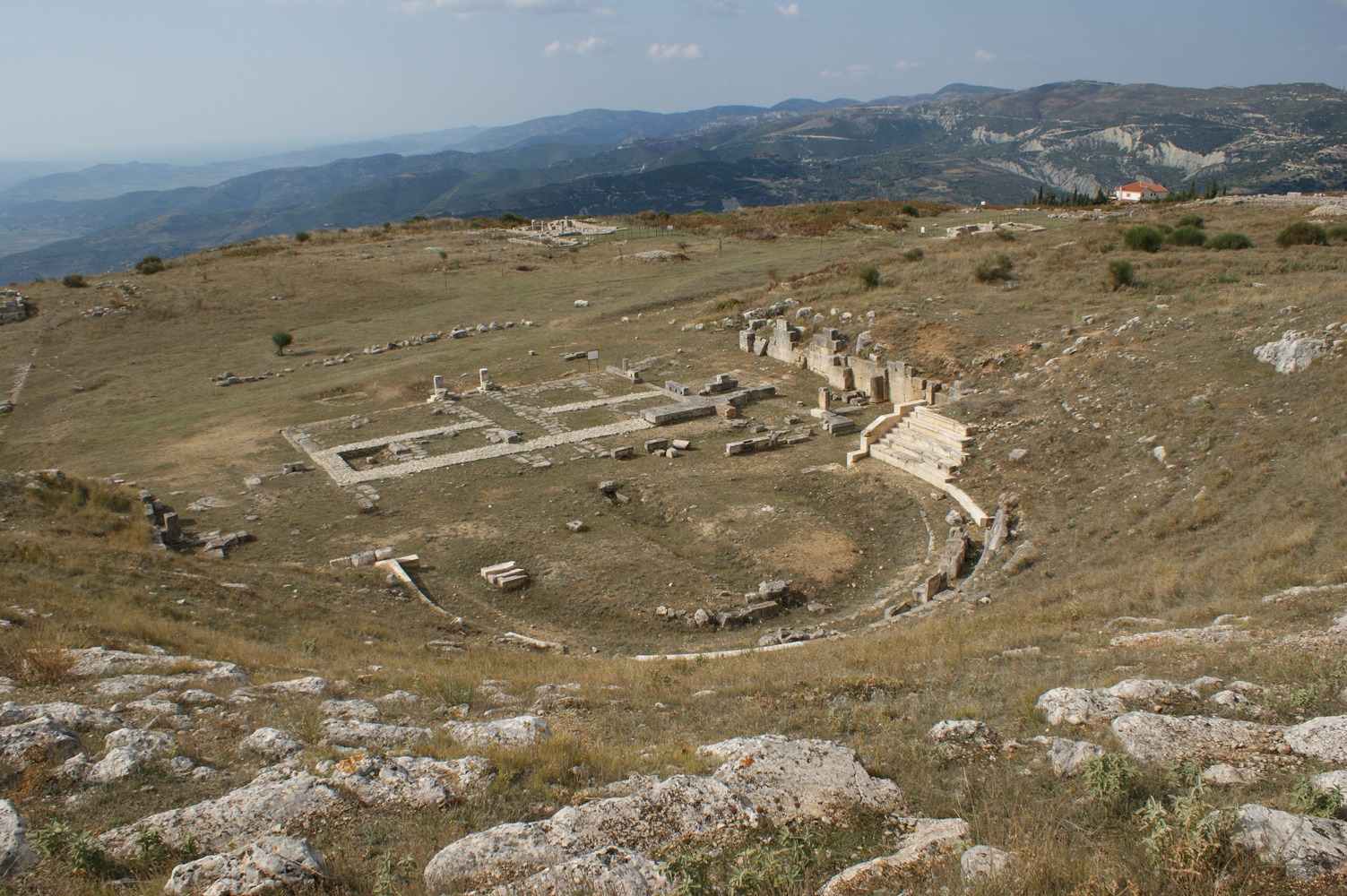
Theater

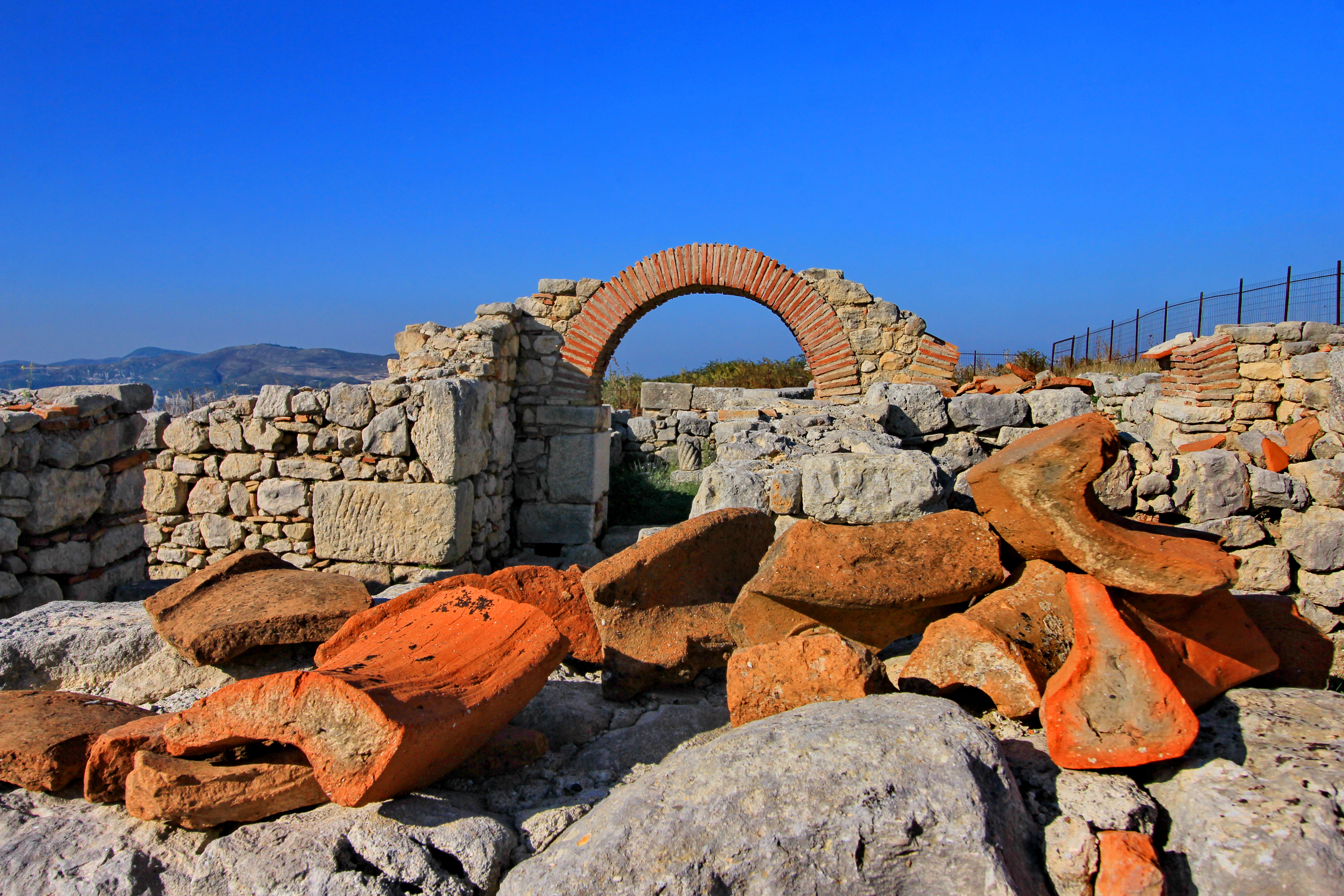
Ruins

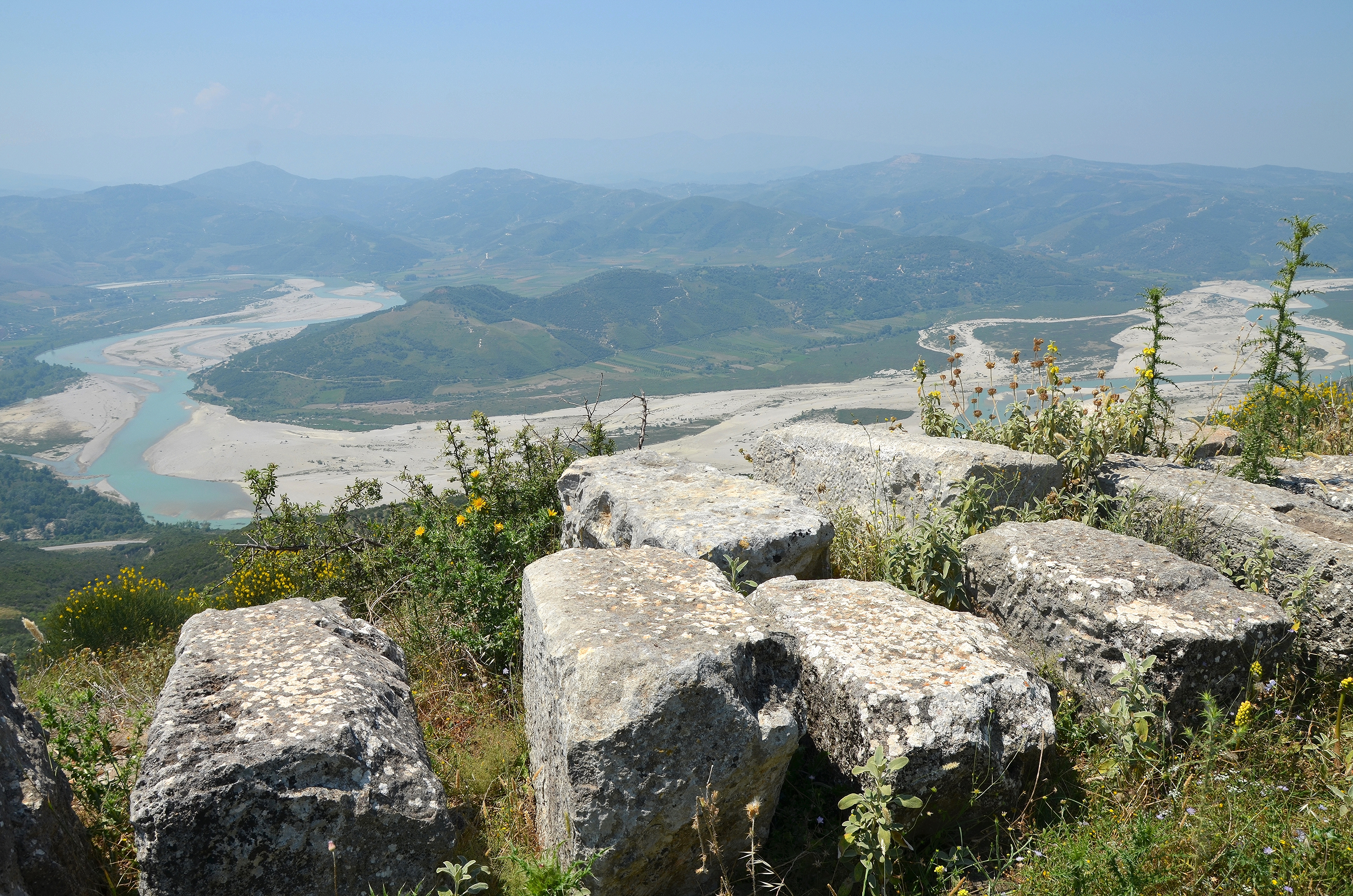
View from the remains

==== Ancient Greeks and Romans ====
===== Butrint =====
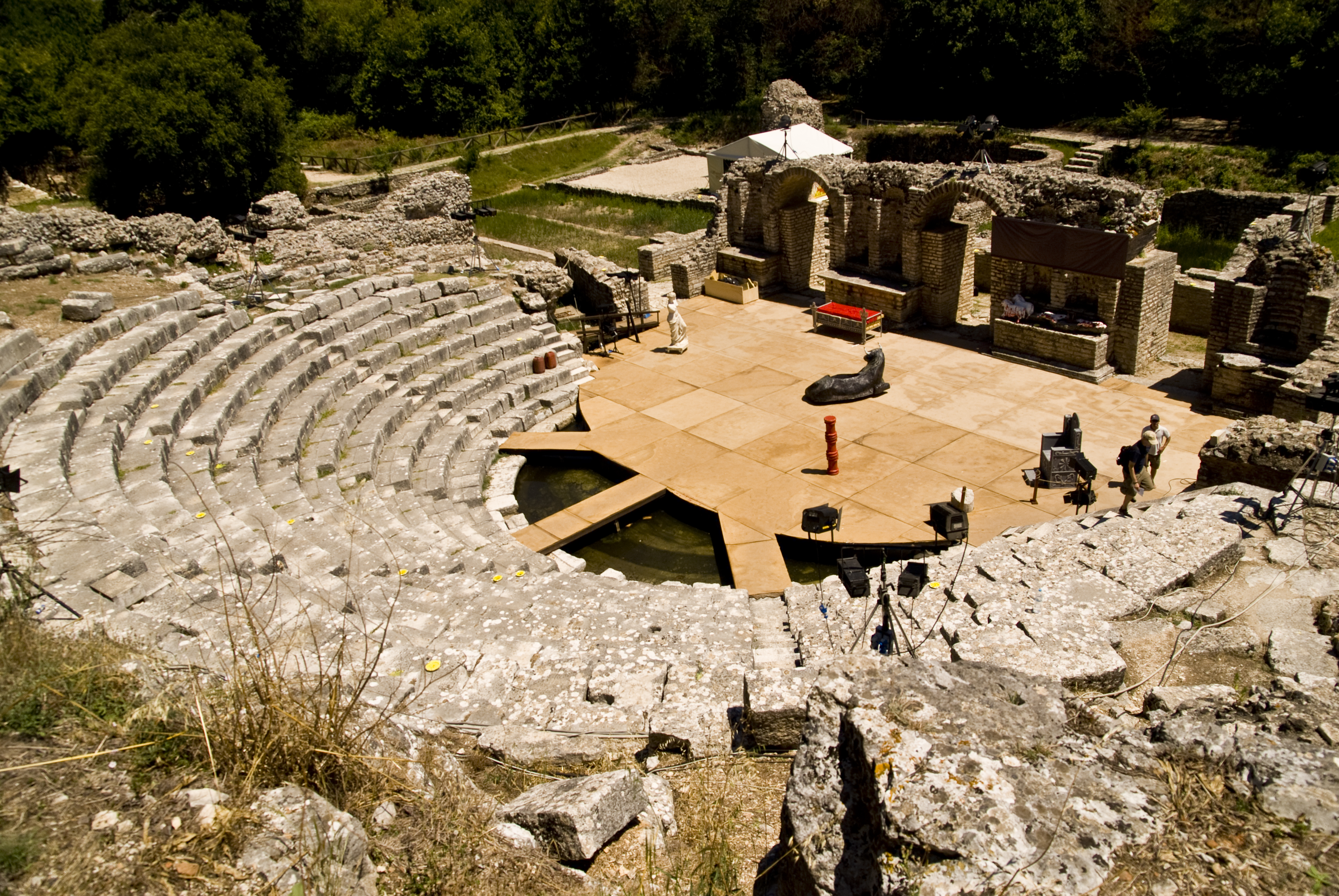
Butrint has been included in the UNESCO list of World Heritage Sites.

The acropolis was erected on a hill on the bank of a lake Butrint (or lake Bouthrotum). The first extension of the 7th century BC acropolis occurred during the 5th century BC. During the first years of the second Peloponnesian War (413–404 BC) the Corkyreans built fortifications stretching from Ksamil to Buthrotum. Buthrotum being previously an independent city, became subject to nearby Corfu.

By the 4th century BC it had grown in importance and included a theatre, a sanctuary dedicated to Asclepius and an agora. The acropolis of Bouthrotum was protected by three circuit walls. The last and outer wall was erected around 380 BC enclosing and area of 4ha. This 870m-long wall included bastions and five gates. Two of the most important gates were known as Scean and Lion gate. Moreover, the agora, the stoas, the residential zone and the theatre were located in a separate walled area.

Several inscriptions in Buthrotum describe the organization of the Chaonians in the beginning of the 3rd cent. BC. which show that they too had an annual leader called Prostates (Greek: Προστάτης Protector). The Greek calendar of Bouthroton appears in the oldest known analog computer, the so-called Antikythera Mechanism (c. 150 to 100 BC).

The theatre is known for the impressive number of inscriptions carved on its stones. Most of them deal with manumissions and give a great amount of details on the city during the Hellenistic era. The names of those slaves were almost exclusively Greek with a few exception of Latin ones which bore Greek family names.

In 228 BC Buthrotum became a Roman protectorate alongside Corfu. In the middle of the second century BC Buthrotum was the centre of an independent state, possibly the "Koinon of the Prasaiboi", as listed in the list of the theorodokoi at the Oracle of Delphi.

Previously populated by the Ancient Greeks, Butrint became a protectorate and subsequently a colony. Nowadays, it demonstrates a high level of Roman urbanisation, while it is among the best preserved remains of Roman heritage in Albania. They left its legacy in form of city walls, an aqueduct, the forum, basilicas, baptisteries, baths, an amphitheatre and houses for the middle classes, as well as mansions with central courtyards which were decorated with various mosaics and murals.

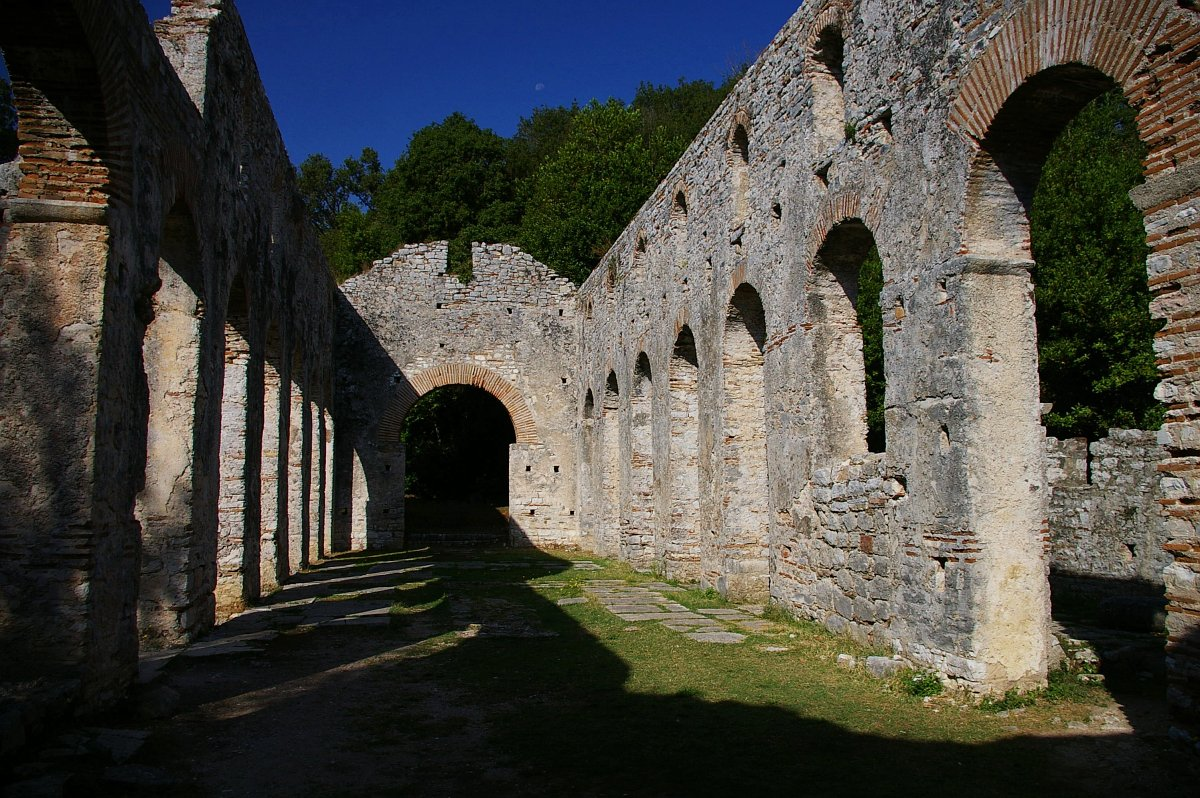
Remains of the great Basilica in 2008.

In 31 BC, Roman Emperor Augustus fresh from his victory over Mark Antony and Cleopatra at the battle of Actium renewed the plan to make Buthrotum a veterans' colony. New residents expanded the city and the construction included an aqueduct, a Roman bath, houses, a forum complex and a nymphaeum. During that era the size of the town was doubled. A number of new structures were built next to the existing ones especially around the theatre and the temple of Asklepeios.

In the early 6th century, Buthrotum became the seat of a bishopric and new construction included the Buthrotum baptistery, one of the largest such paleochristian buildings of its type, and a basilica. The diocese of Buthrotum was initially a suffragan of the Metropolis of Nicopolis, the metropolitan capital of Epirus Vetus and in the papal sway, but in the 9th and 10th centuries it is listed with the suffragans of Naupaktos, which succeeded ruined Nicopolis as provincial capital and metropolis of the new Byzantine theme of Nicopolis, bringing it in the sway of the Byzantine Patriarchate of Constantinople. After the 14th century, it was under the jurisdiction of the Metropolis of Ioannina.

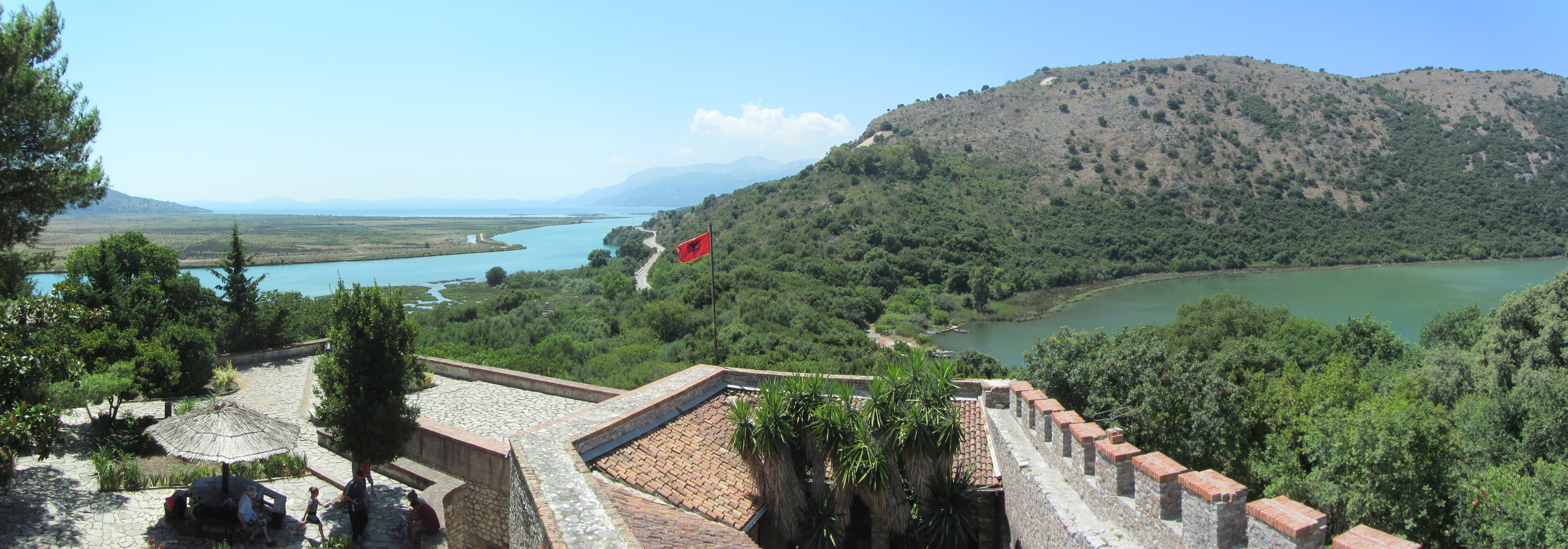

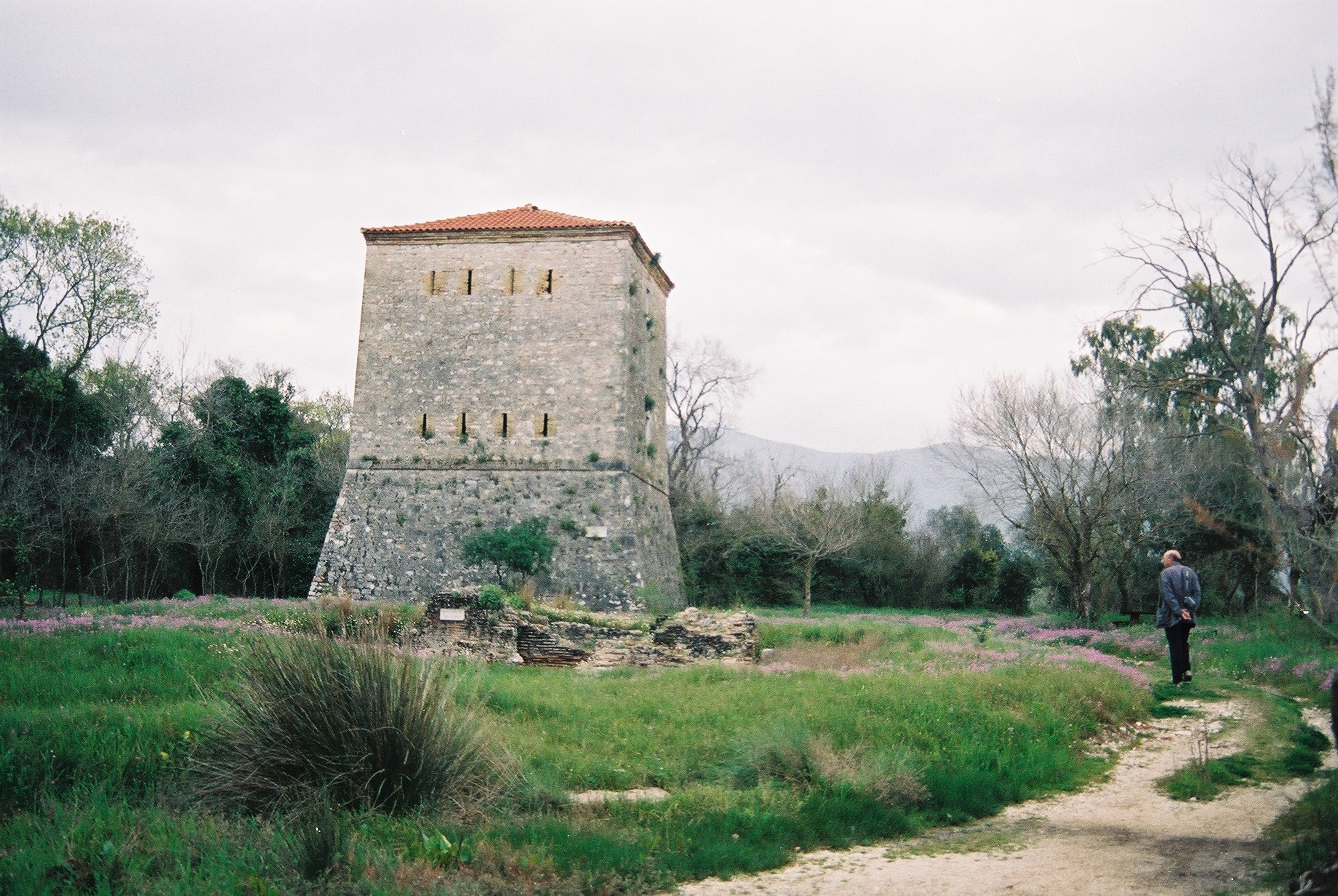

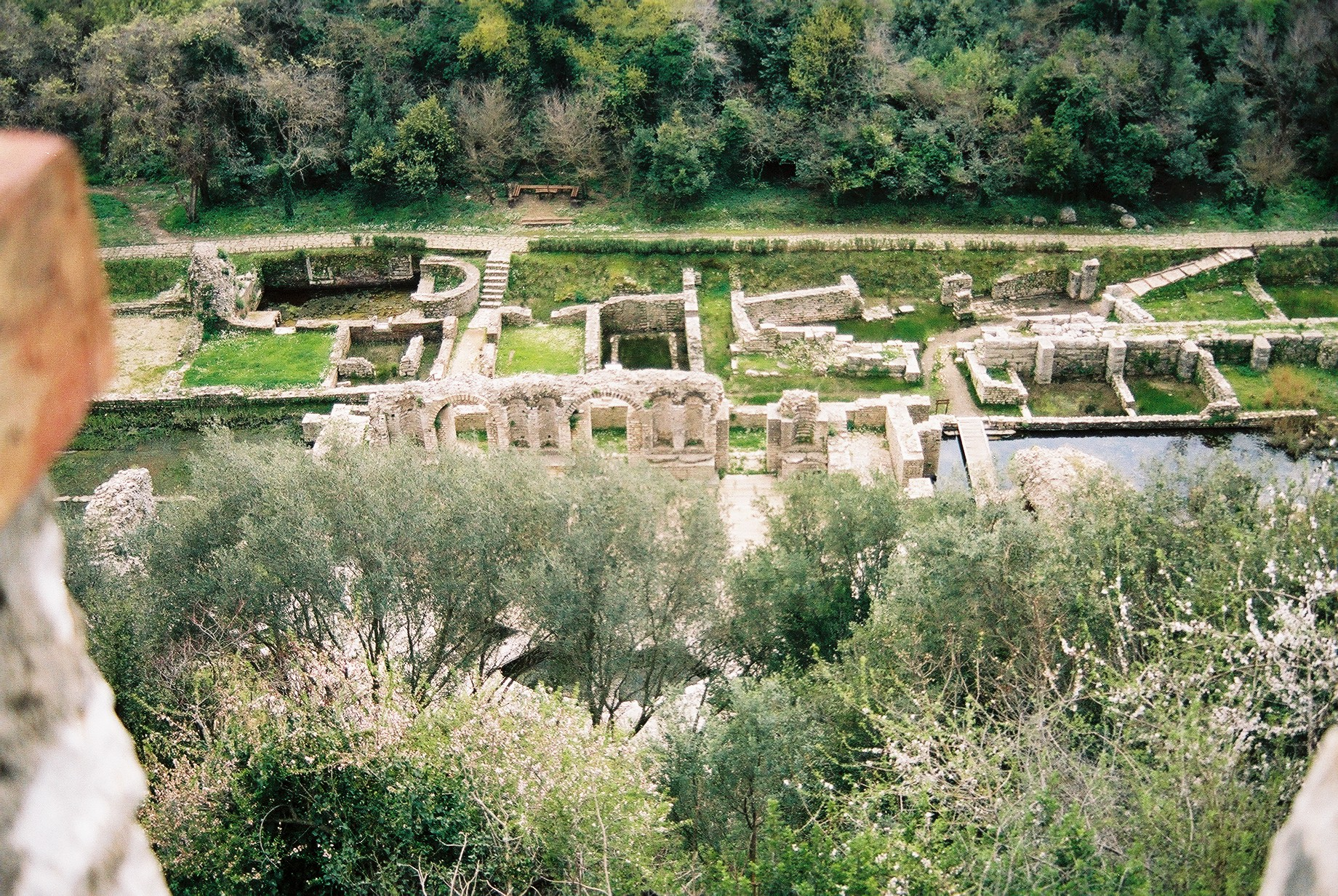

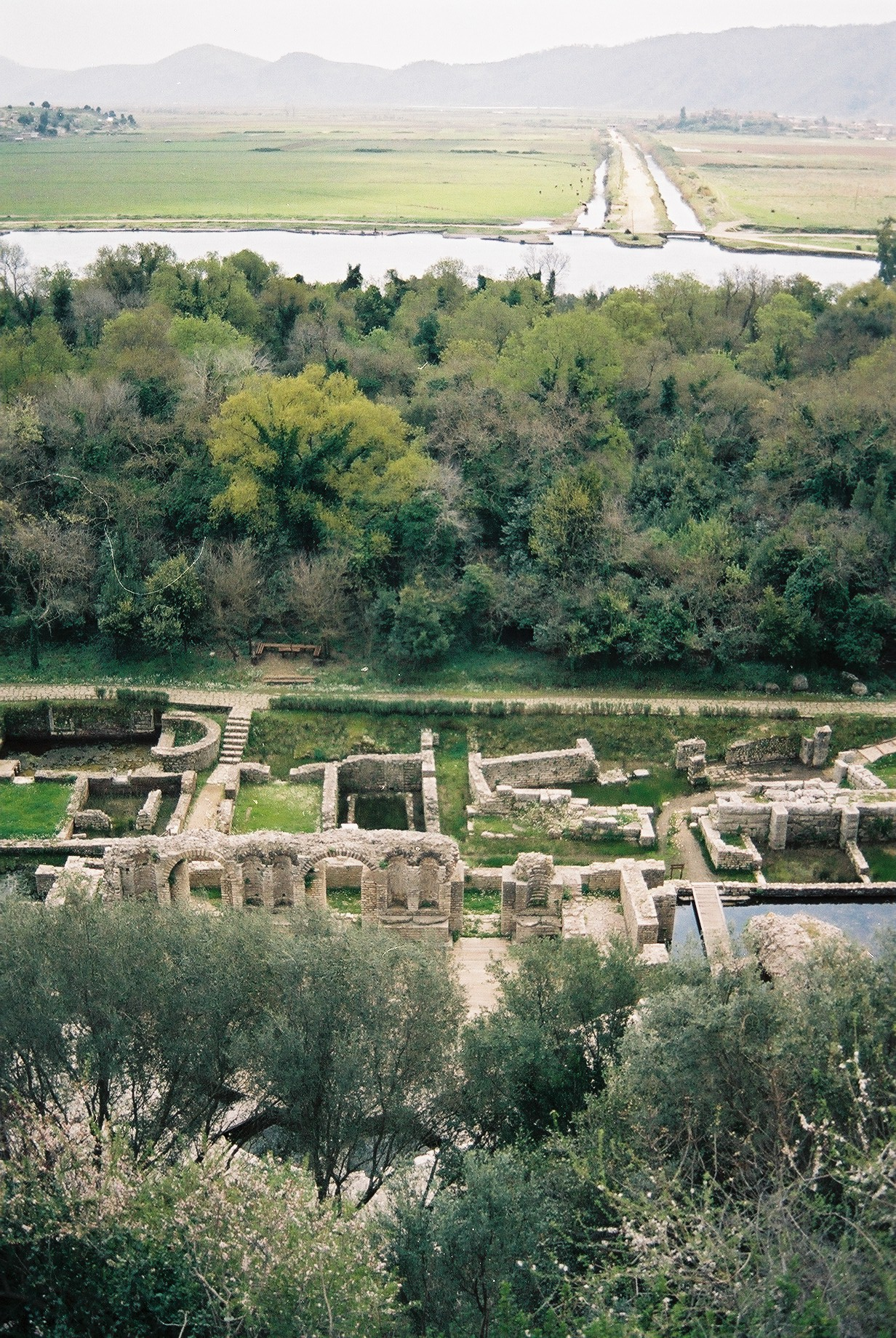

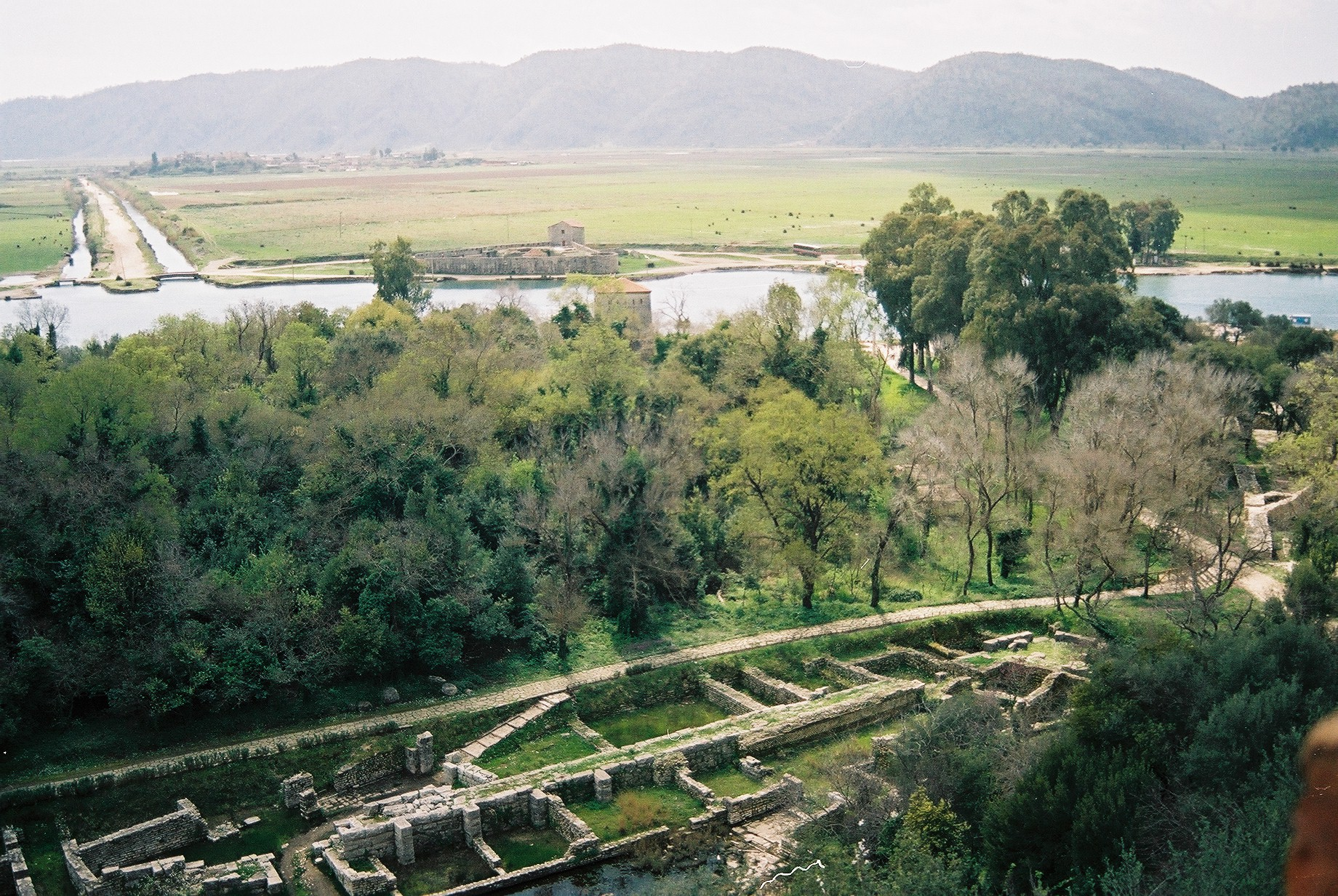

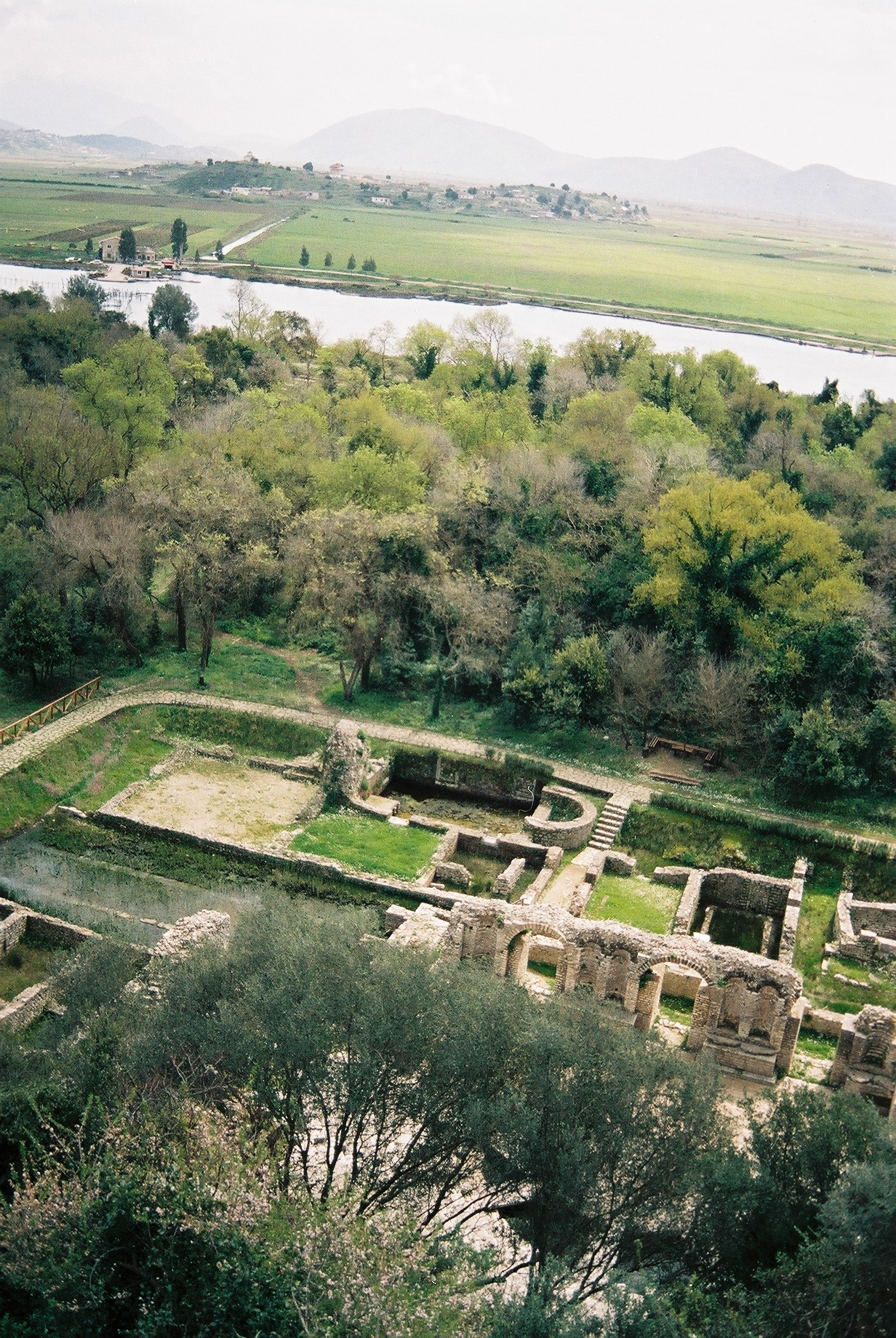

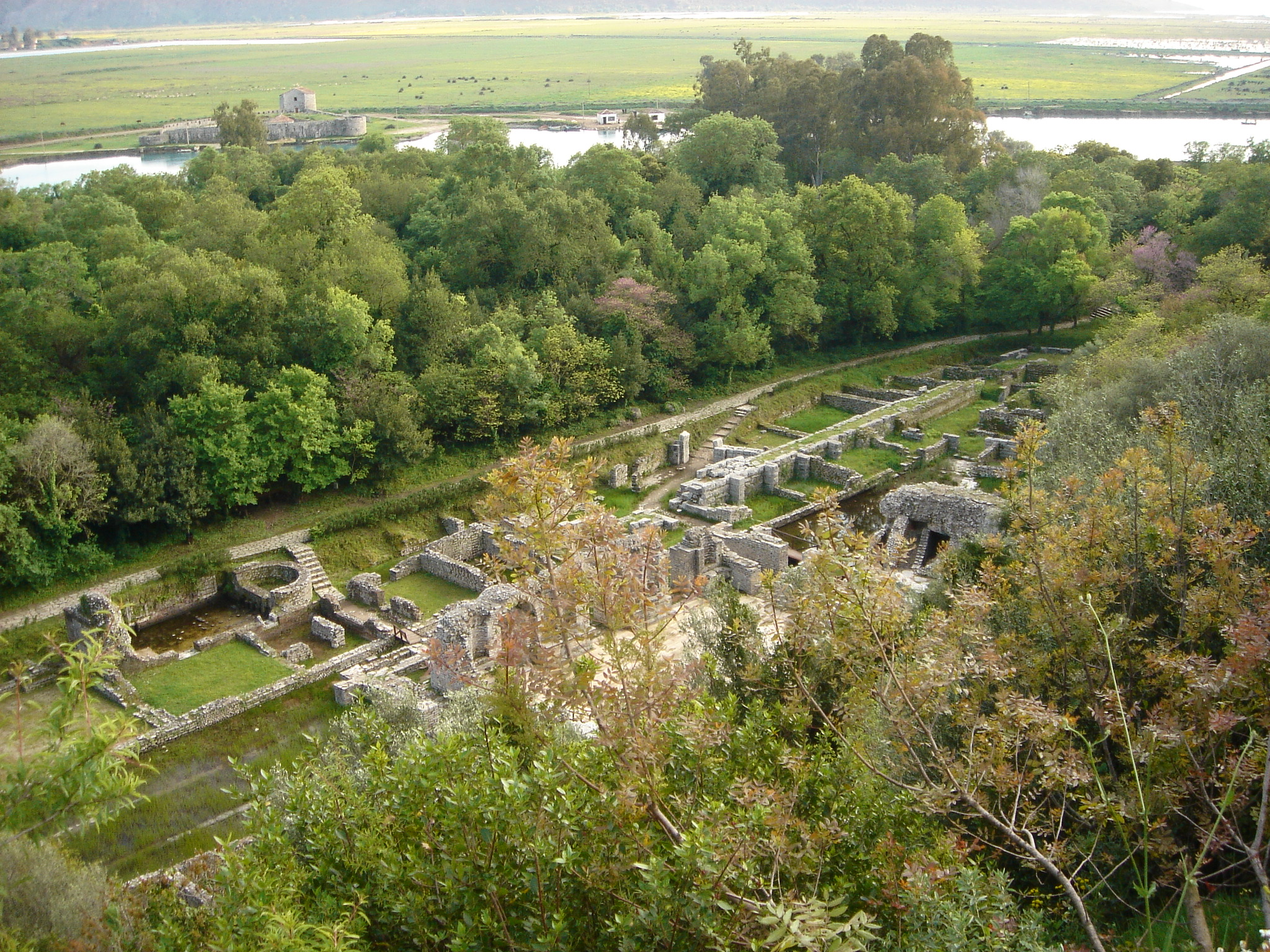

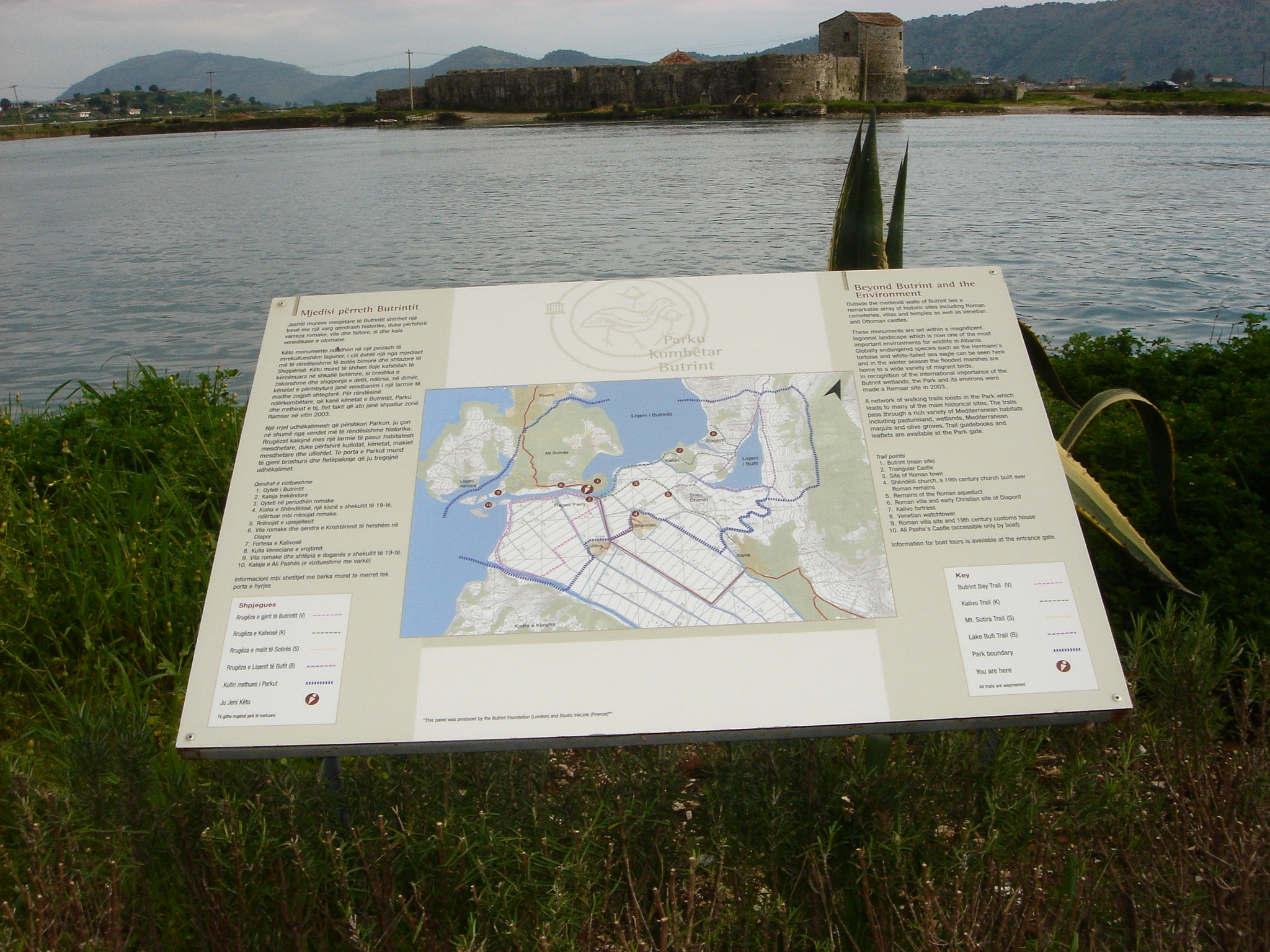

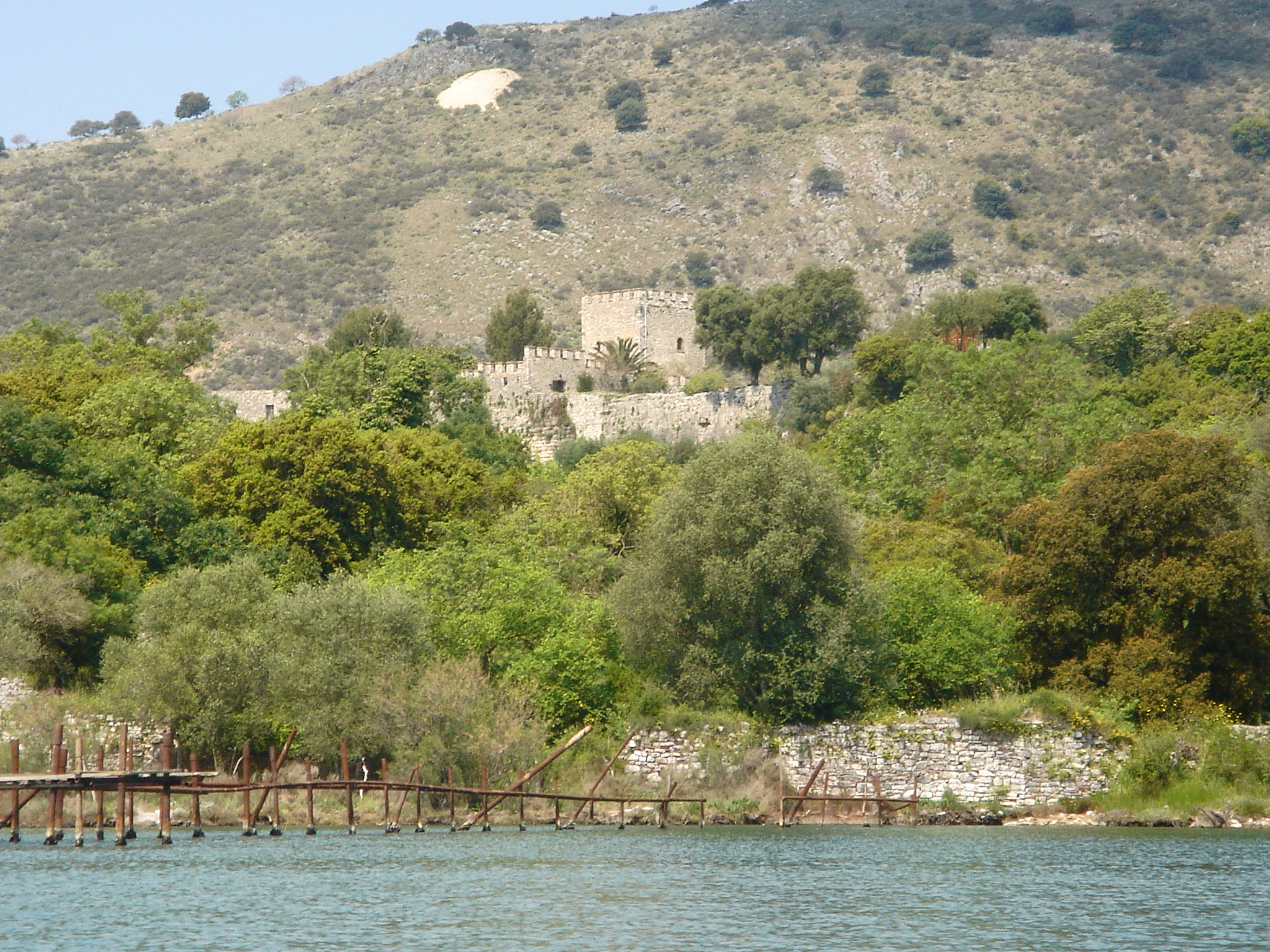

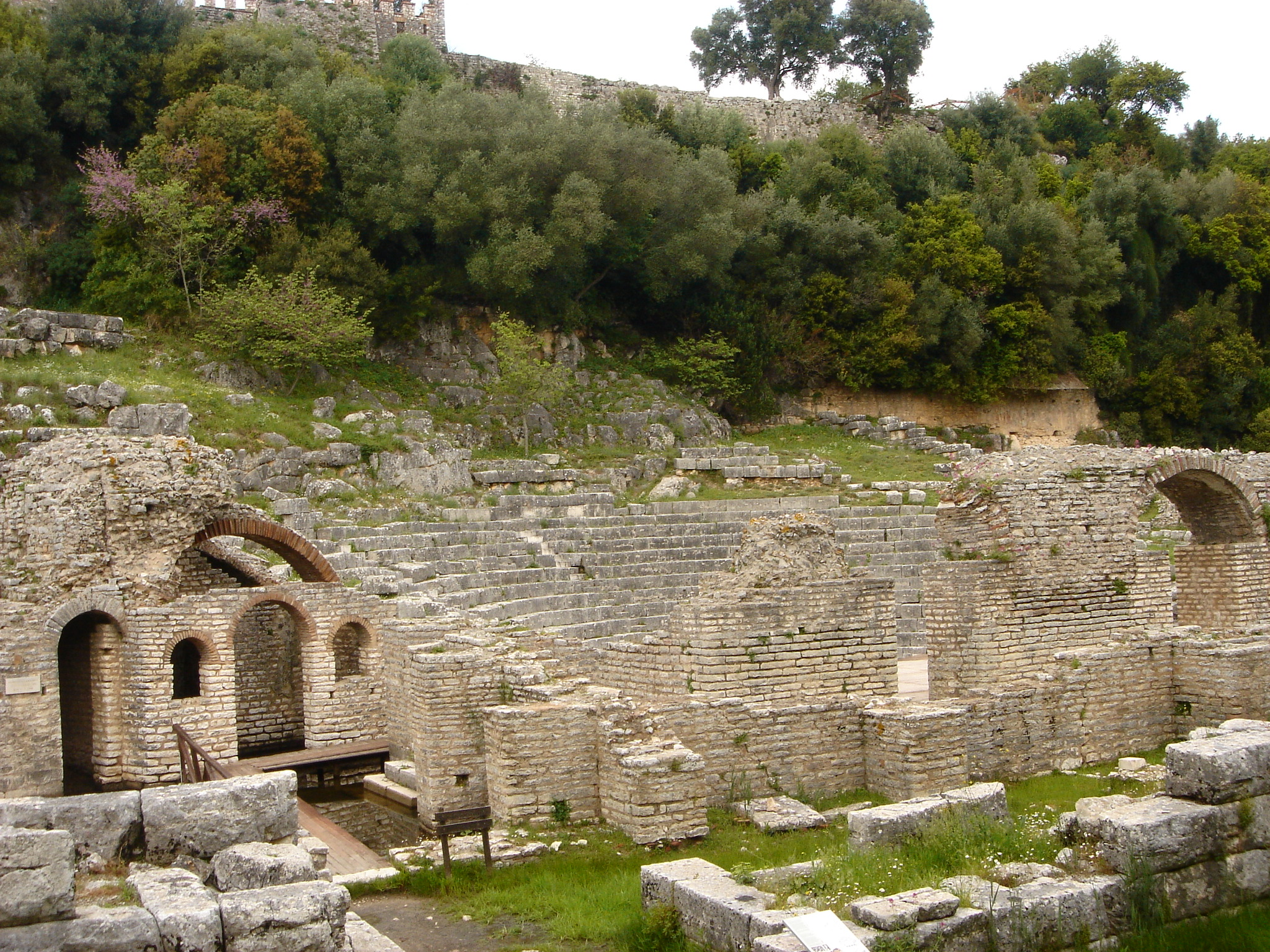

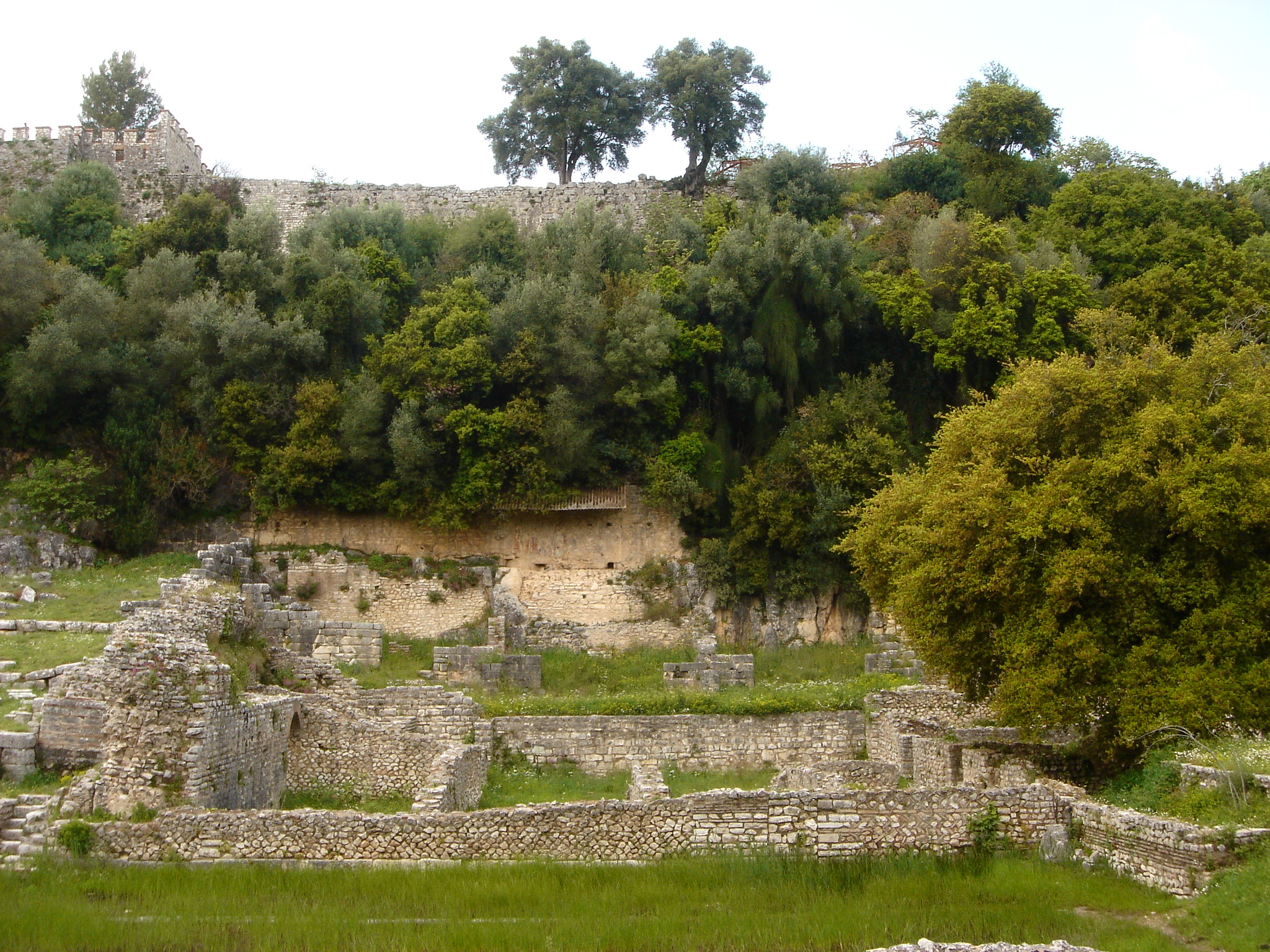

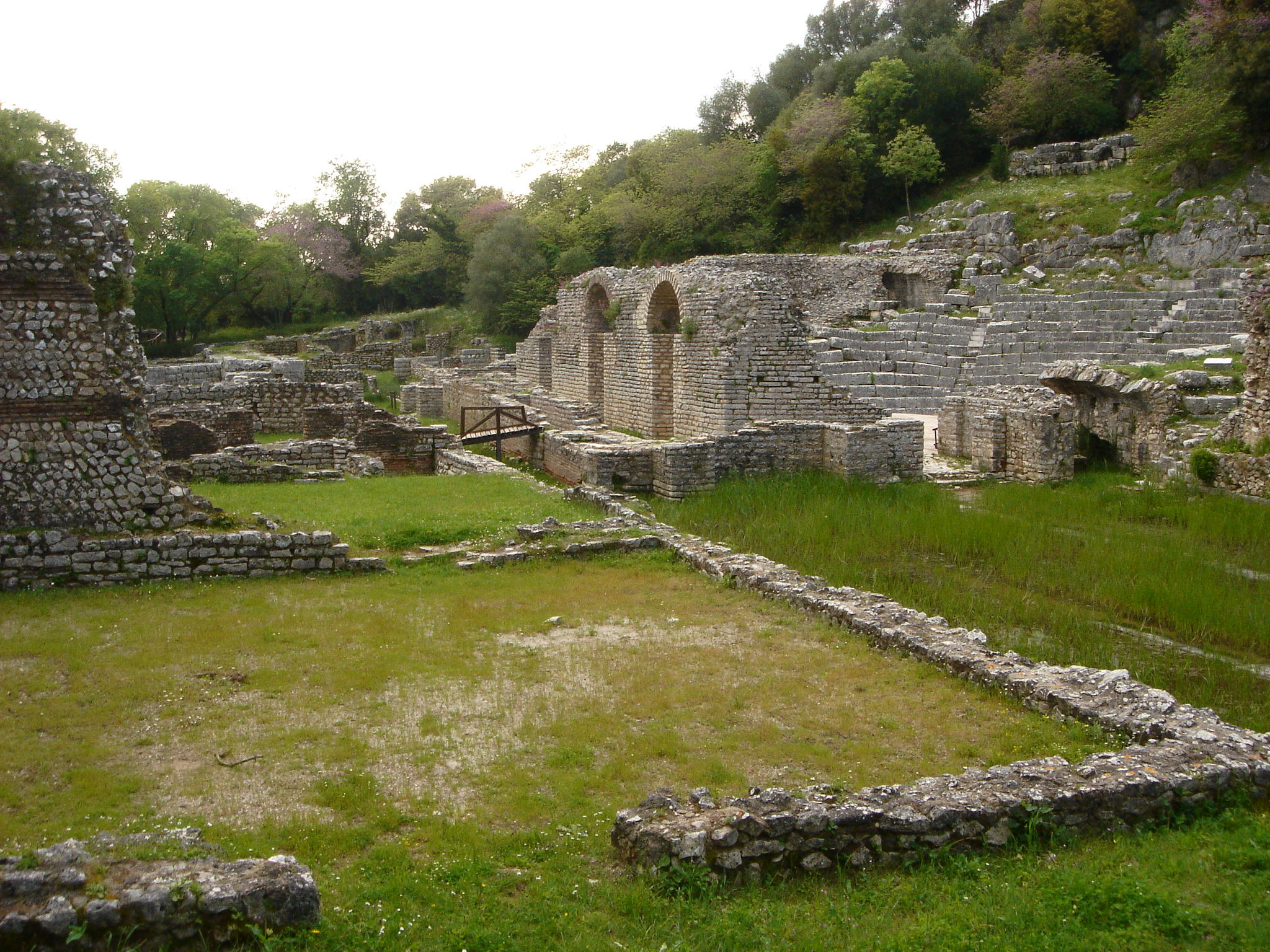

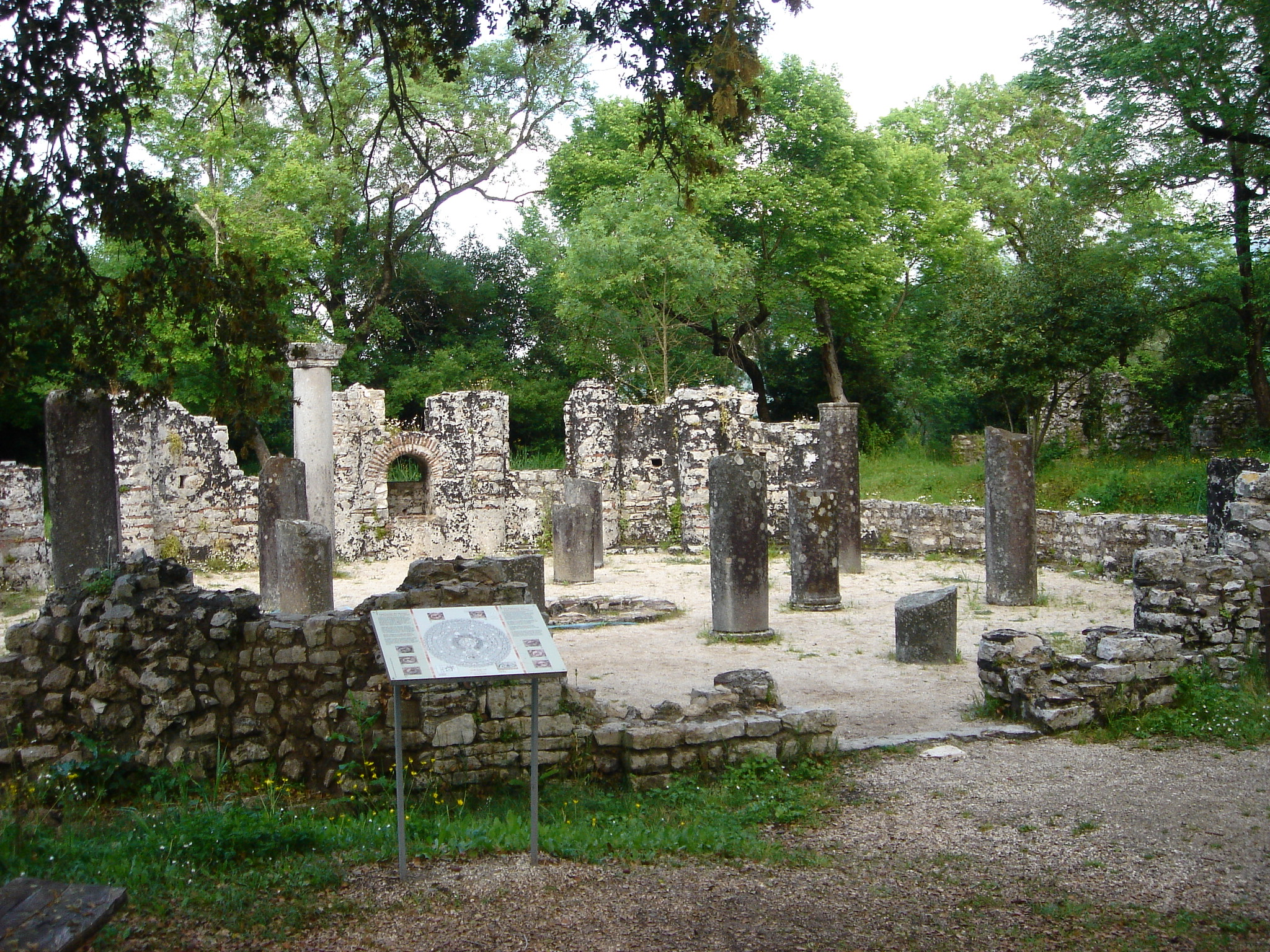

===== Dyrrhachium =====
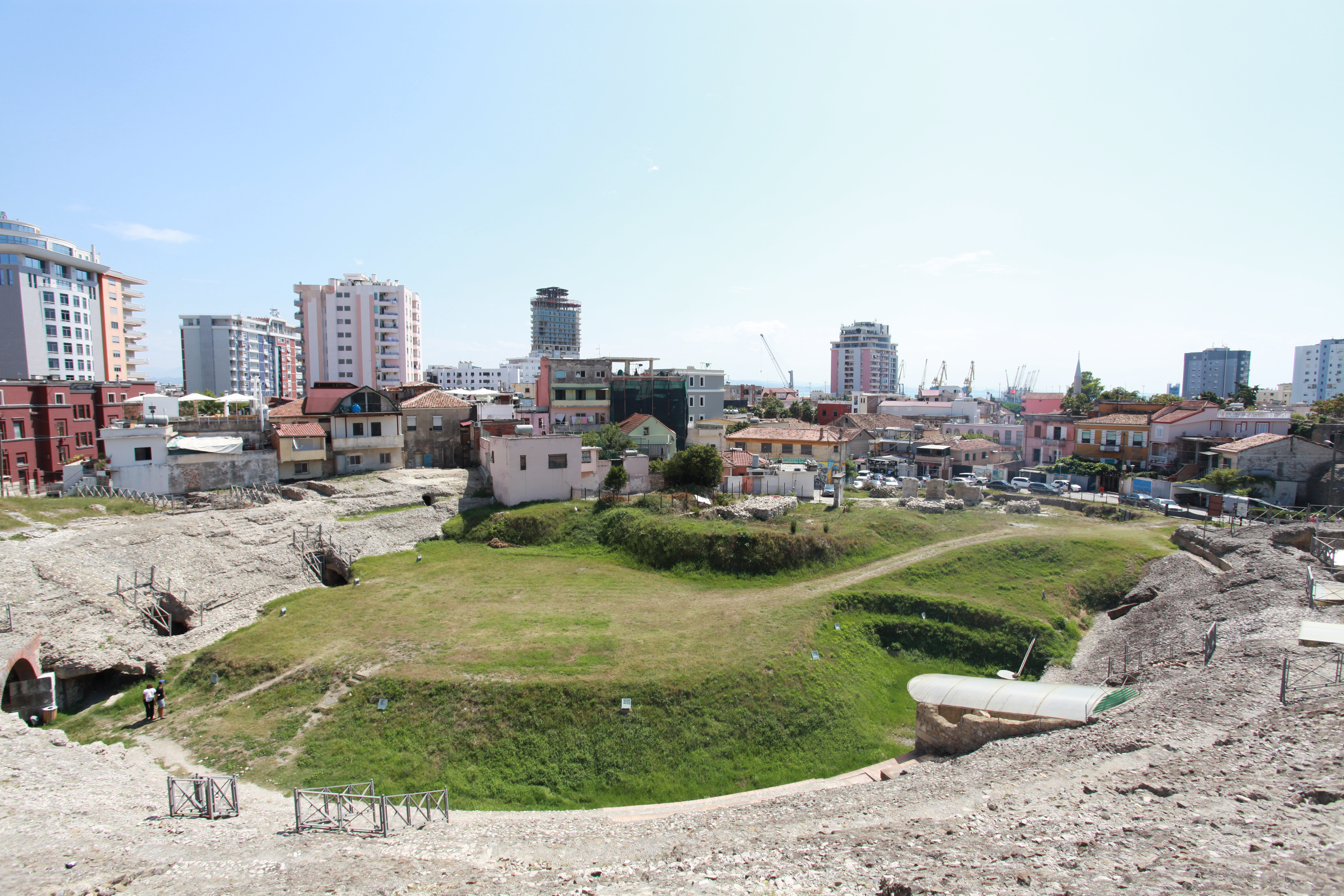
The Amphitheatre of Durrës is on the tentative list for becoming a UNESCO World Heritage Site.

Dyrrachium thrived during the Roman period and became a protectorate after the Illyrian Wars. The Amphitheatre of Durrës, which the Romans built, was at that time the largest amphitheatre in the Balkan Peninsula. It is the only Roman monument that survived up to the present.

The Via Egnatia, built by Roman Senator Gnaeus Egnatius, functioned for two millennia as a multi-purpose highway, which once connected the cities of Durrës on the Adriatic Sea in the west to Constantinople on the Marmara Sea in the east. Further, the route gave the Roman colonies of the Balkans a direct connection to Rome.

An amphitheatre was built in the beginning of the 2nd century AD, and was used for performances until the 4th century AD. The earthquake of 345/346 likely damaged the monument and closed the 'ludii gladiatorii'. An early Christian chapel was constructed on the amphitheatre in the second half of the 4th century. The chapel was initially decorated with frescoes; in the 6th century, mosaics were added. A medieval chapel was built in the 13th century, also decorated with frescoes. The amphitheatre was covered over in the 16th century, after the Ottoman occupation, when a wall was built nearby. Marin Barleti described the monument as 'well constructed'.

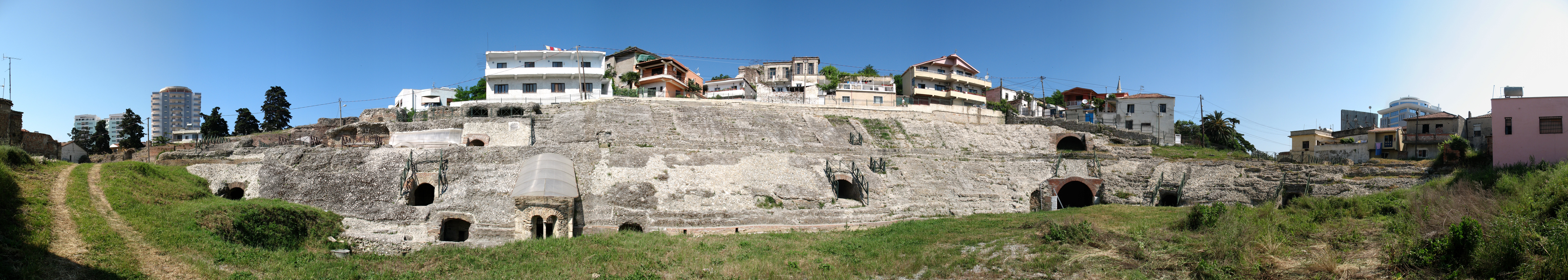
Panorama of the Durrës Amphitheatre

=== Middle Ages ===
==== Cities of Medieval Albania ====
Medieval cities in Albania are classified according to two criteria:

- Cities associated with fortifications, such as Berat and Gjirokastra
- Cities that lie in flat or steep terrains such as Tirana, Kavaja, and Elbasan.

During the Middle Ages, a variety of architecture styles developed in the form of dwelling, defence, worship and engineering structures. When the Roman Empire divided into east and west, Albania remained under the Eastern Roman Empire. In behalf to that, the architecture was strongly influenced by the Byzantines. Many extensive churches and monasteries were built during that period mainly in the centre and south of the country.

However, some inherited historic structures were damaged by invading Ottoman forces. In the 13th and 14th centuries, the consolidation of the Albanian feudal principalities gave rise to Varosha, or neighbourhoods outside city walls. Examples of such developments are the Arberesh principalities centred in Petrele, Kruje and Gjirokastra originating from the feudal castle. In the 15th century, close attention was given to protective structures such as the castle fortifications of Lezha, Petrela, Devoll, Butrint, and Shkodra. More reconstructions took place in strategic points such as the Castle of Elbasan, Preza, Tepelena, and Vlora, the latter being the most important on the coast. In the 18th and 19th centuries, the great Pashaliks of the period such as the Bushati Family, Ahmet Kurt Pasha, and Ali Pashe Tepelena reconstructed several fortifications such as the Castle of Shkodra, Berat, and Tepelena respectively. Ali Pashe Tepelena embarked on a major castle building campaign throughout Epirus.

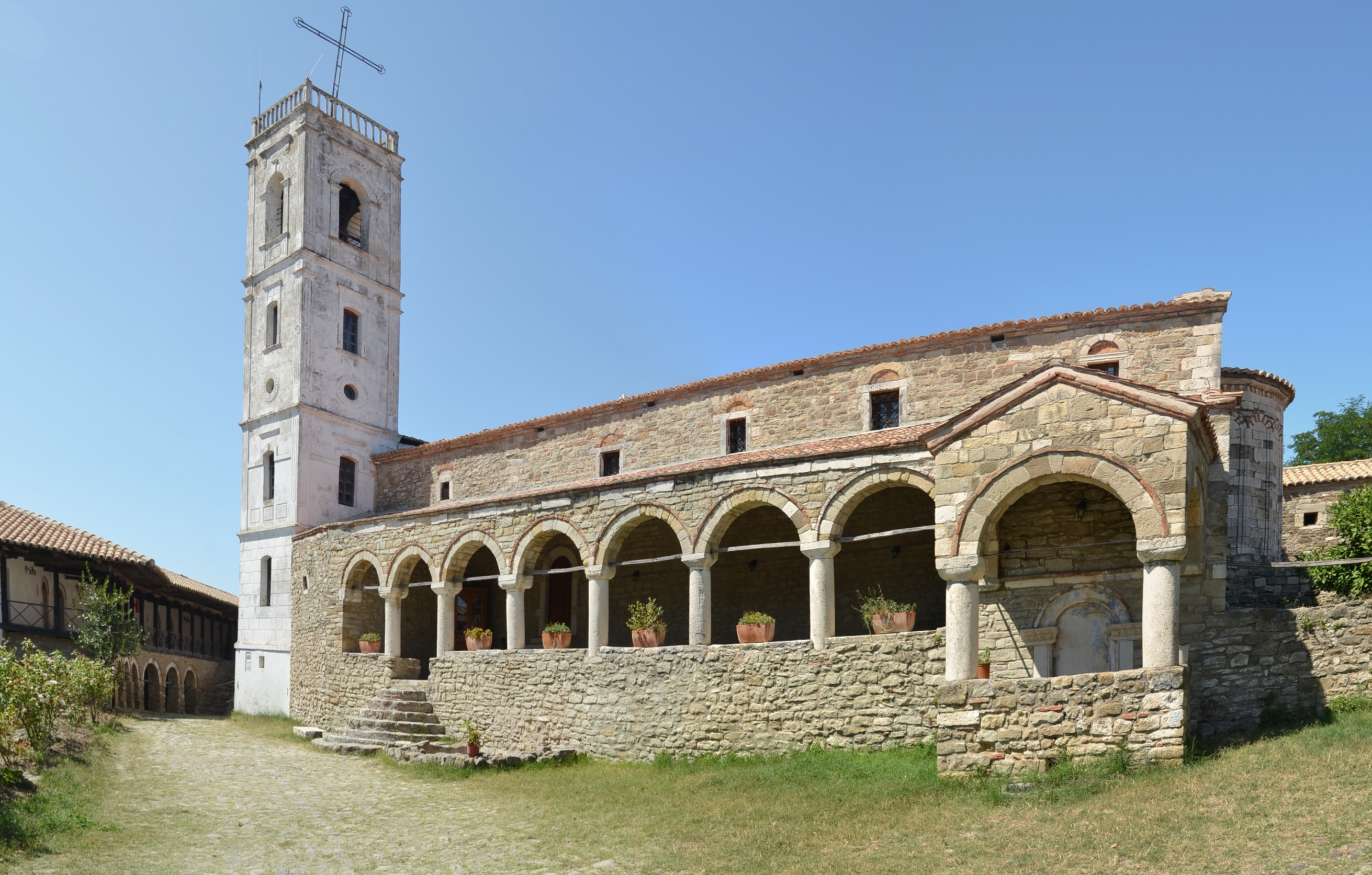
The Ardenica Monastery near Fier.

During the medieval period, mosques in Albania fell into two categories: those covered with a dome, and those with a roof covered hall. The latter were immediately adopted following the Ottoman invasion, by transforming the existing churches of Shkodra, Kruje, Berat, Elbasan and Kanina. For instance, the Lead Mosque built by Mustafa Pasha Bushati in Shkodra resembles a typical Istanbul mosque.

On the other hand, Christian religious structures inherited many features from their palaeo-Christian predecessors. Between the 16th and 19th centuries, a series of small structures for Christian with simple layouts were built like the Voskopoja basilica, Ardenica Monastery, and Church of St. Nicholas in Voskopoja. The latter is one of the most valuable architectonic monuments in Albania. Its interior walls are covered with paintings by the renowned painter David Selenica, and by brothers Constantine and Athanasios Zografi.

==== Castles ====
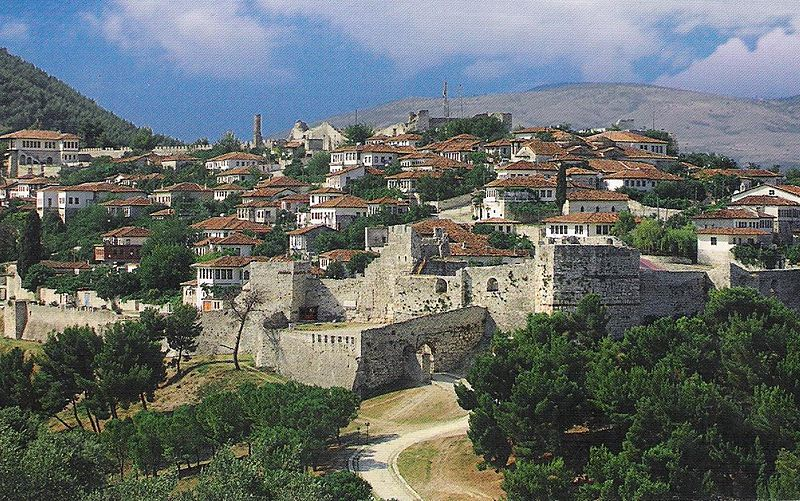
Ottoman architecture within the Castle of Berat.

The scenic landscapes of Albania are dotted with castles, forts and citadels in all shapes and sizes. Previously they was mostly defined by their practical use to repel invasions and often serve as a royal residence for noble families. Those structures constitute treasures and legacy of the historic past of Albania. The first castles in the Albanian lands were built by Illyrians and Romans and later by Venetians and Ottomans. The majority have been renovated throughout history and different epoches with changing rule and adaptations to war technology development.

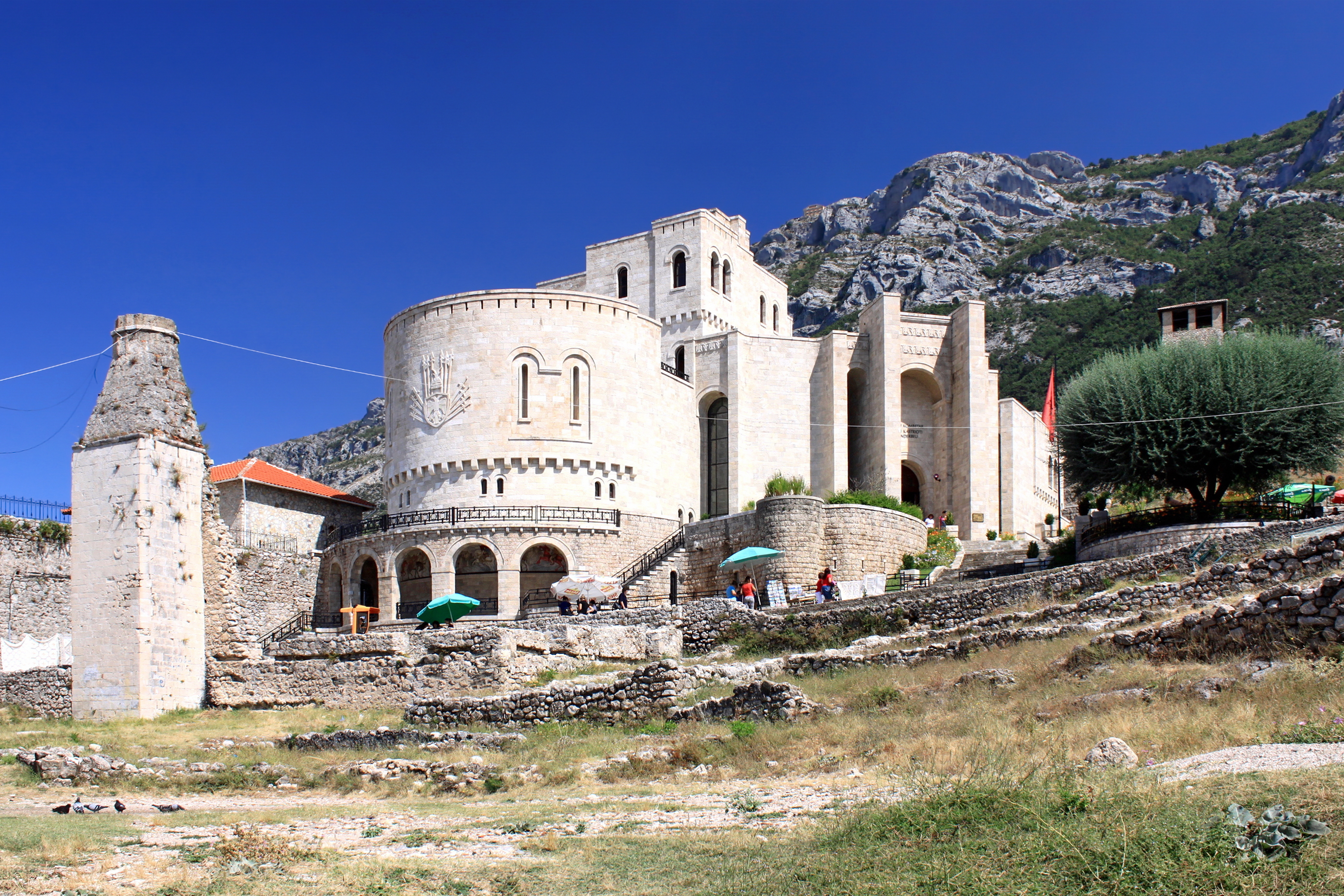
The medieval Castle of Krujë.

The Castle of Berat has a long history, which can be traced back to the 4th century. After being burned down by the Romans, the walls were strengthened again in the 5th century under the Byzantines and later in the 15th century by the Ottomans. The fortress was often damaged, particularly during the Communism in Albania, and reconstructed. It possesses several Byzantine churches dotted with impressive frescoes, murals and icons, whereas the Ottoman heritage is demonstrated in forms of mosques and traditional houses.

The Castle of Krujë is a typical medieval fortress built upon a rocky hill in Krujë that resisted the advance of the Ottomans several times under the reign of Gjergj Kastrioti Skënderbeu. It was constructed during the 5th and 6th centuries and the surrounding walls are reinforced by nine towers, which served as an observation and signaling post. There can still be found the remains of houses and mansions.

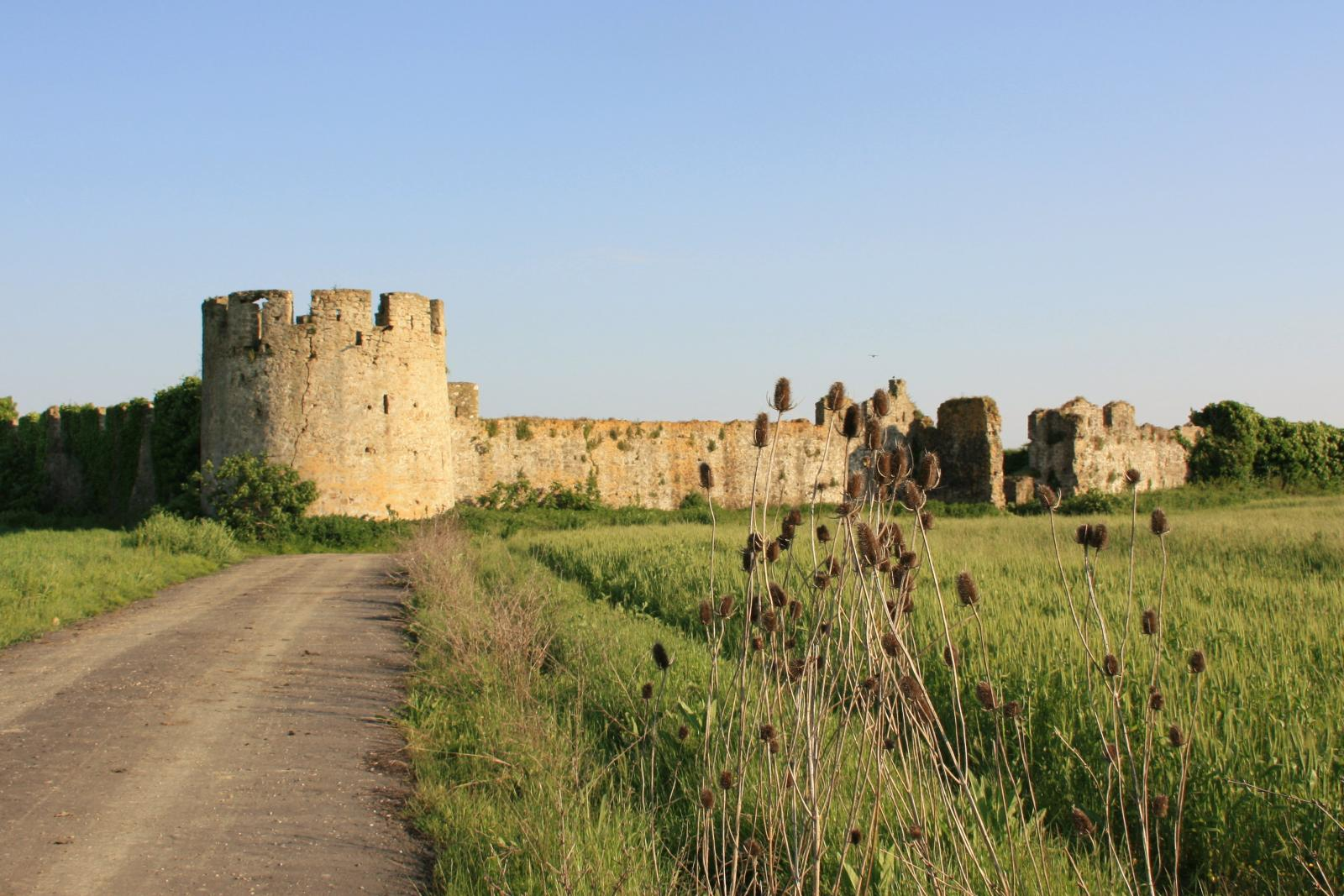
The Fortress of Bashtovë is on the tentative list for becoming an UNESCO World Heritage Site.

The Fortress of Bashtovë was built over an existing former structure by the Venetians in the Middle Ages. It stands in a very strategic point near the mouth of Shkumbin River close to the Adriatic Sea. The castle is a typical Venetian structure that combined the Gothic lancet arch with Byzantine and Ottoman influences.

Petrelë Castle is a medieval castle located on a hilltop overlooking Petrelë and Erzen Valley. The castle has a triangular structure with two observation towers. The early fortifications probably dates from the 3rd century, while in the 9th century it was expanded and served as a base for Skanderbeg during his revolt against the Ottoman Empire.

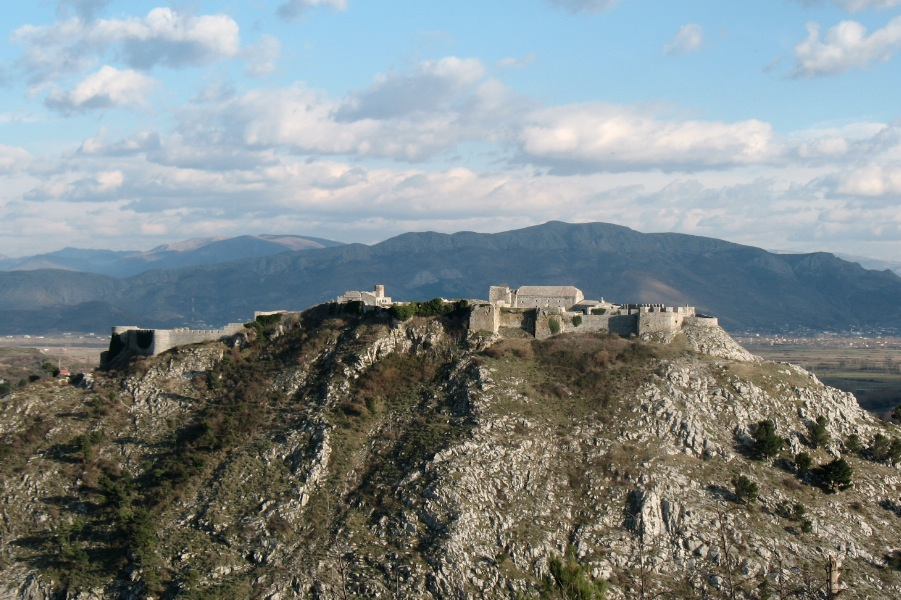
Scenic view of Rozafa Castle in Shkodër.

Rozafa Castle is an ancient castle in Shkodër. The castle is associated with a famous legend about a woman who was buried in the foundation of the castle. It stretches on a rocky hill and is trapped on three sides by the rivers of Buna, Kir and Drin. Its current name, Rozafa, appeared for the first time in the early Middle Ages. Later when the Ottomans conquered the Balkans the castle than was turned into a mosque.

The Citadel of Gjirokastër, a hilltop fortress, dominates the cityscape of Gjirokastër and overlooks the strategically important route along the Drino river valley. There are five towers and houses, a clock tower, a church, a cistern and many other structures within the fortification.

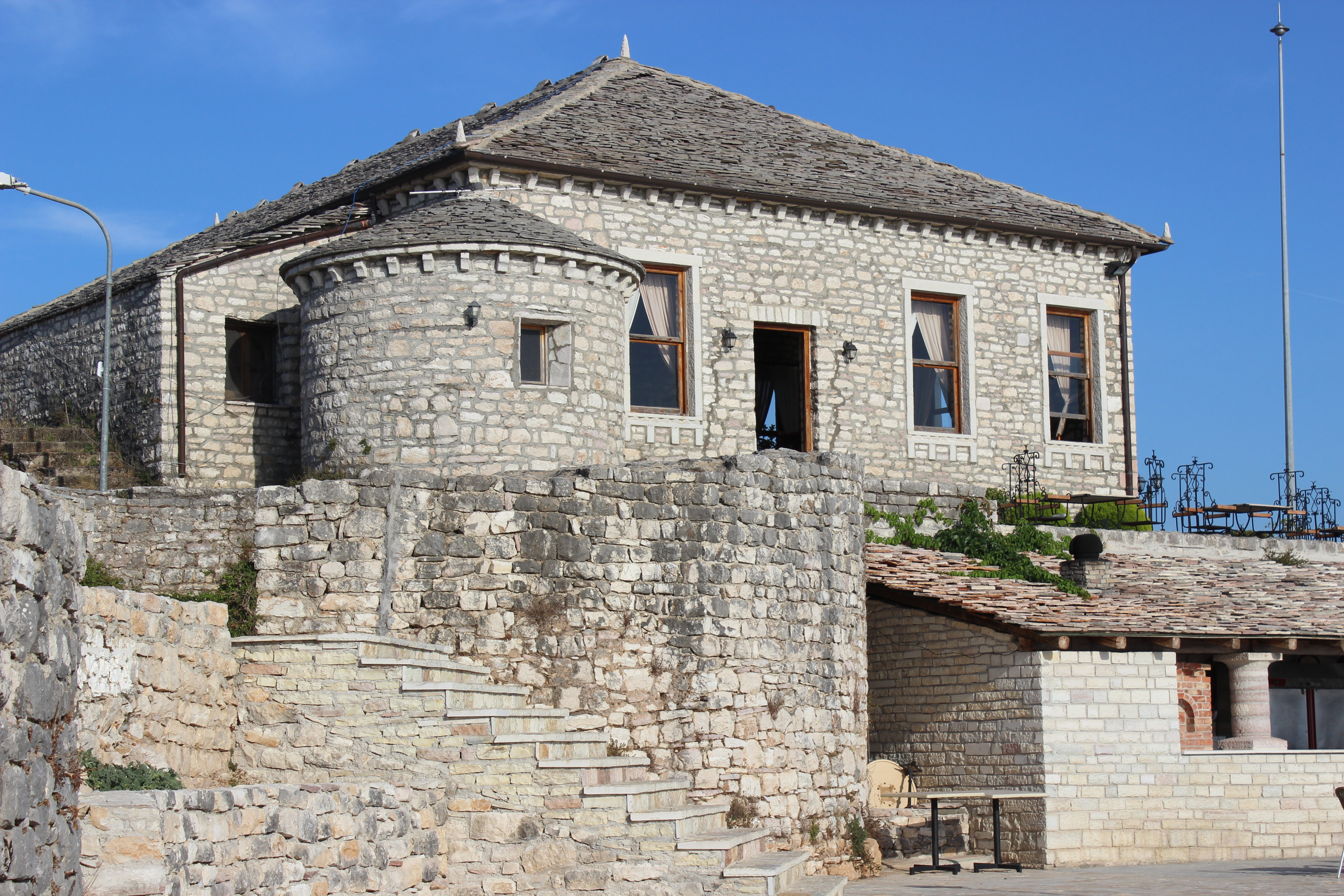
The Lëkurësi Castle in Sarandë was built in the late Middle Ages.

Ali Pasha Castle was built on a small island along the mouth of the Vivari Channel in Butrint. The castle is named after the Albanian Ali Pasha of Ioannina, who ruled over the Pashalik of Yanina and even attempted to rival the Dey of Algiers in the seas. It is a small rectangular structure with battered walls, while along the corners, there are two battered round towers with cannons on its seaward side and two irregularly sized battered square towers equipped with firing loops or windows.

The Rodoni Castle stand within the Cape of Rodon with a proximity to the Adriatic Sea. Its name is derived from the Illyrian god of Rodon. After the First Siege of Krujë and League of Lezhë, the Kastriotis decided to increase the fortifications for the use against the Ottomans. Skanderbeg chose the Cape of Rodon as the location of the castle and construction began in 1450.

Although other prominent and impressive castles with different architectural styles in Albania include the Durrës Castle, Kaninë Castle, Lezhë Castle, Lëkurësi Castle, Prezë Castle and Fortress of Justinian.

=== Modern ===
During the 18th century, the city silhouette in Albania began to include places of worship and the Clock Tower. These, together with other social structures such as thermal baths, fountains, and medrese further enriched the city centre and its neighbourhoods.

In the 17th century, the bazaar emerges as a production and exchange centre, while the city expands beyond the castle, which completely loses its function and inhabitants. During this period, Shkodra and Korca become important commerce and skilled crafts centres.

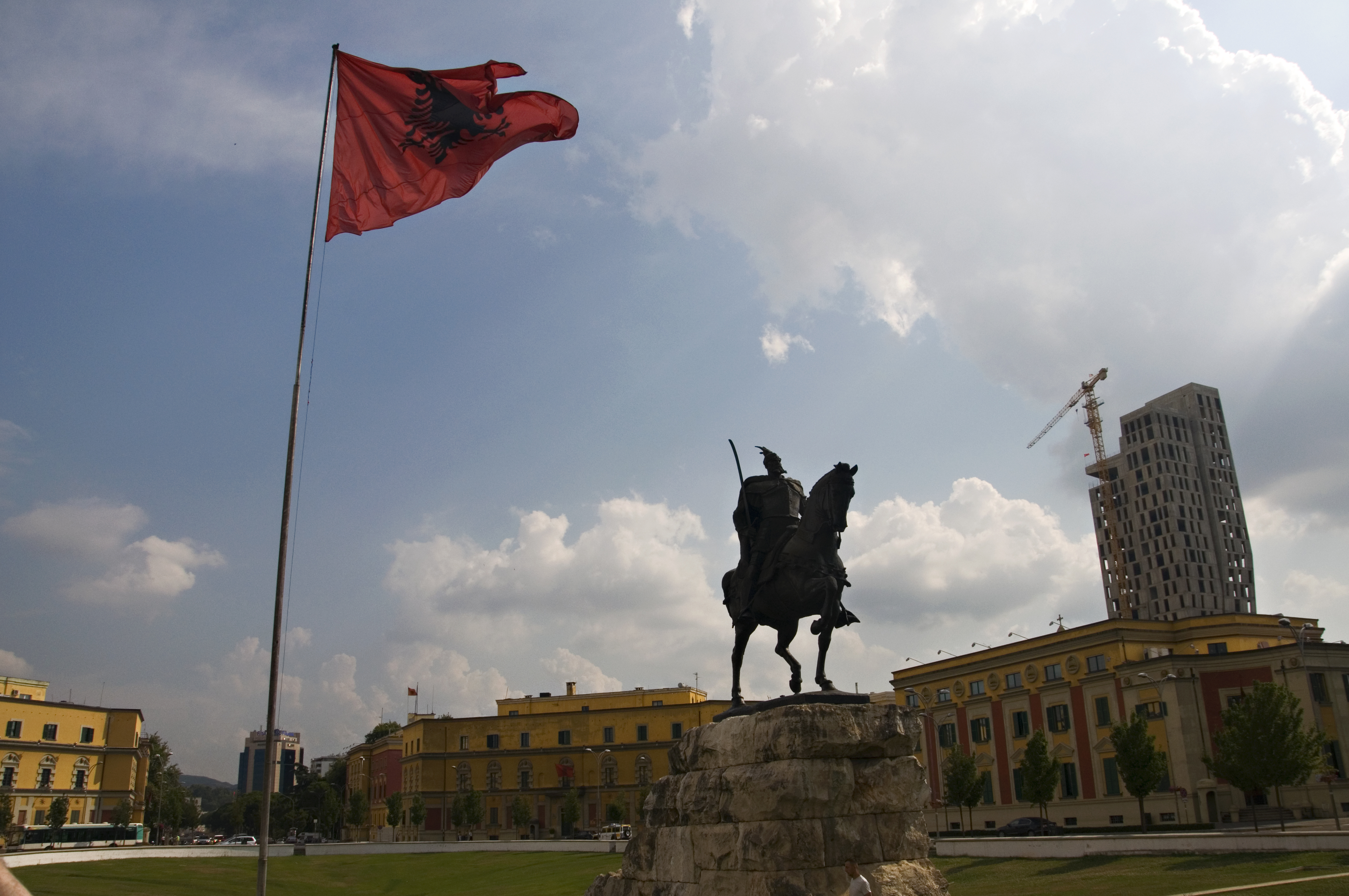
The Skanderbeg Square in Neo-Renaissance style.

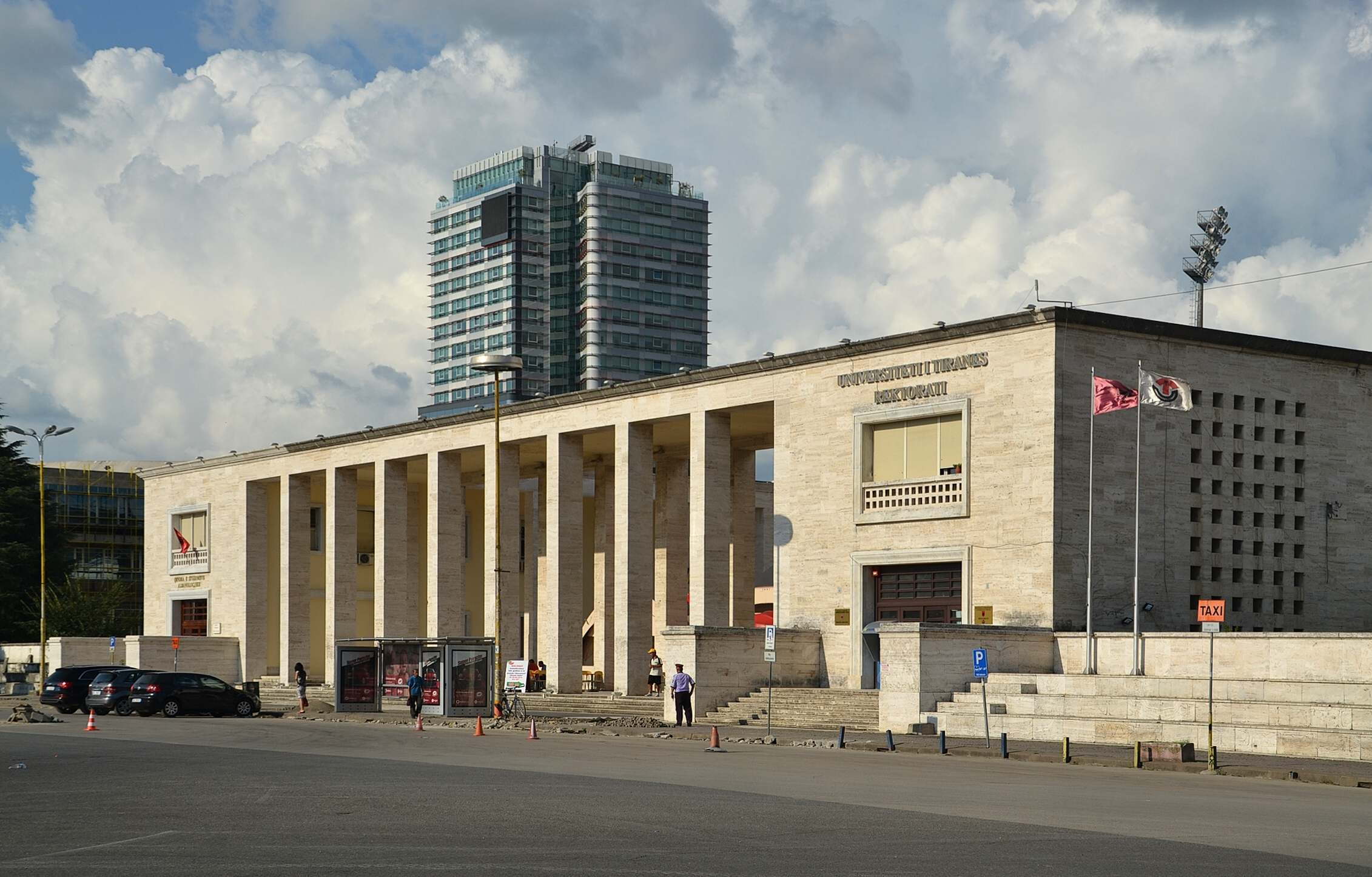
Fascist architecture in Tirana

The first half of the 20th century begins with the Austro-Hungarian occupation, continues with Fan Noli's government, King Zog's kingdom, and ends with the Italian invasion. During this time, Albanian medieval towns underwent urban transformations by Austro-Hungarian architects, giving them the appearance of European cities.

The centre of Tirana was the project of Florestano Di Fausto and Armando Brasini, well known architects of the Benito Mussolini period in Italy. Brasini laid the basis for the modern-day arrangement of the ministerial buildings in the city centre.

The plan underwent revisions by the Albanian architect Eshref Frashëri, the Italian architect Castellani, and the Austrian architects Weiss and Kohler. The rectangular parallel road system of Tirana e Re district took shape, while the northern portion of the main Boulevard was opened. These urban plans formed the basis of future developments in Albania after the second World War.

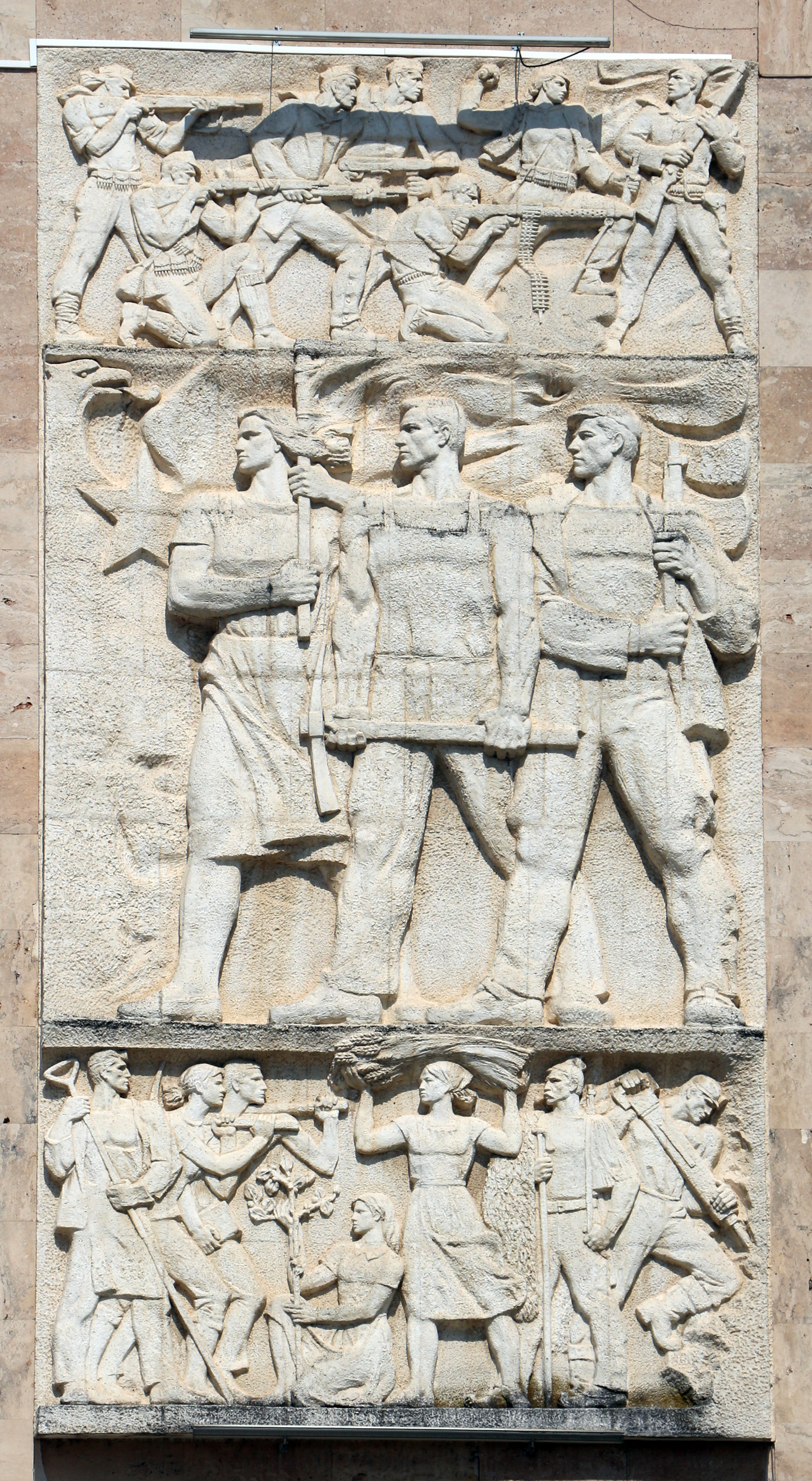
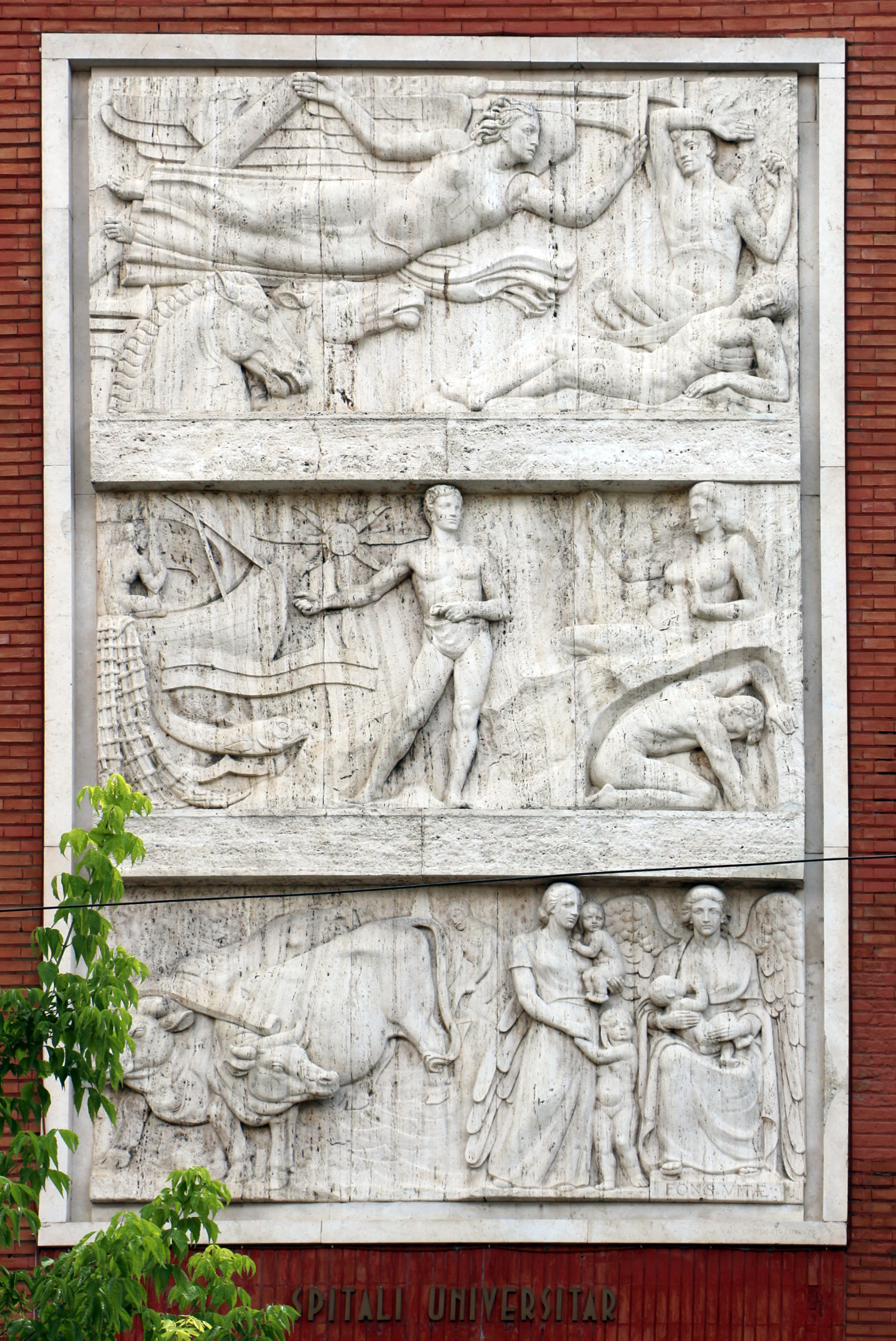
Reliefs at the Council of Ministers Building.Left The reliefs at the facade of the University Hospital in Tirana. Right

From 1944 to 1991, cities experienced an ordered development with a decline in architectural quality. Massive socialist-styled apartment complexes, wide roads, and factories were constructed, while town squares were redesigned and a number of historic buildings demolished.

The period after the fall of communism is often described negatively in terms of urban development. Kiosks and apartment buildings started to occupy former public areas without planning, while informal districts formed around cities from internal migrants leaving remote rural areas for the western lowland. Decreasing urban space and increased traffic congestion have become major problems as a result of lack of planning. As part of the 2014 Administrative Division Reform, all town centres in Albania are being physically redesigned and façades painted to reflect a more Mediterranean look.

Although much has been achieved, critics argue that there is no clear vision on Tirana's future. Some of the pressing issues facing Tirana are loss of public space due to illegal and chaotic construction, unpaved roads in suburban areas, degradation of Tirana's Artificial Lake, rehabilitation of Skanderbeg Square, an ever-present smog, the construction of a central bus station and lack of public parking space. Future plans include the construction of the Multimodal Station of Tirana and the tram line, rehabilitation of the Tiranë River area, construction of a new boulevard along the former Tirana Railway Station and the finishing of the Big Ring Road.

== Cities ==
=== Berat ===
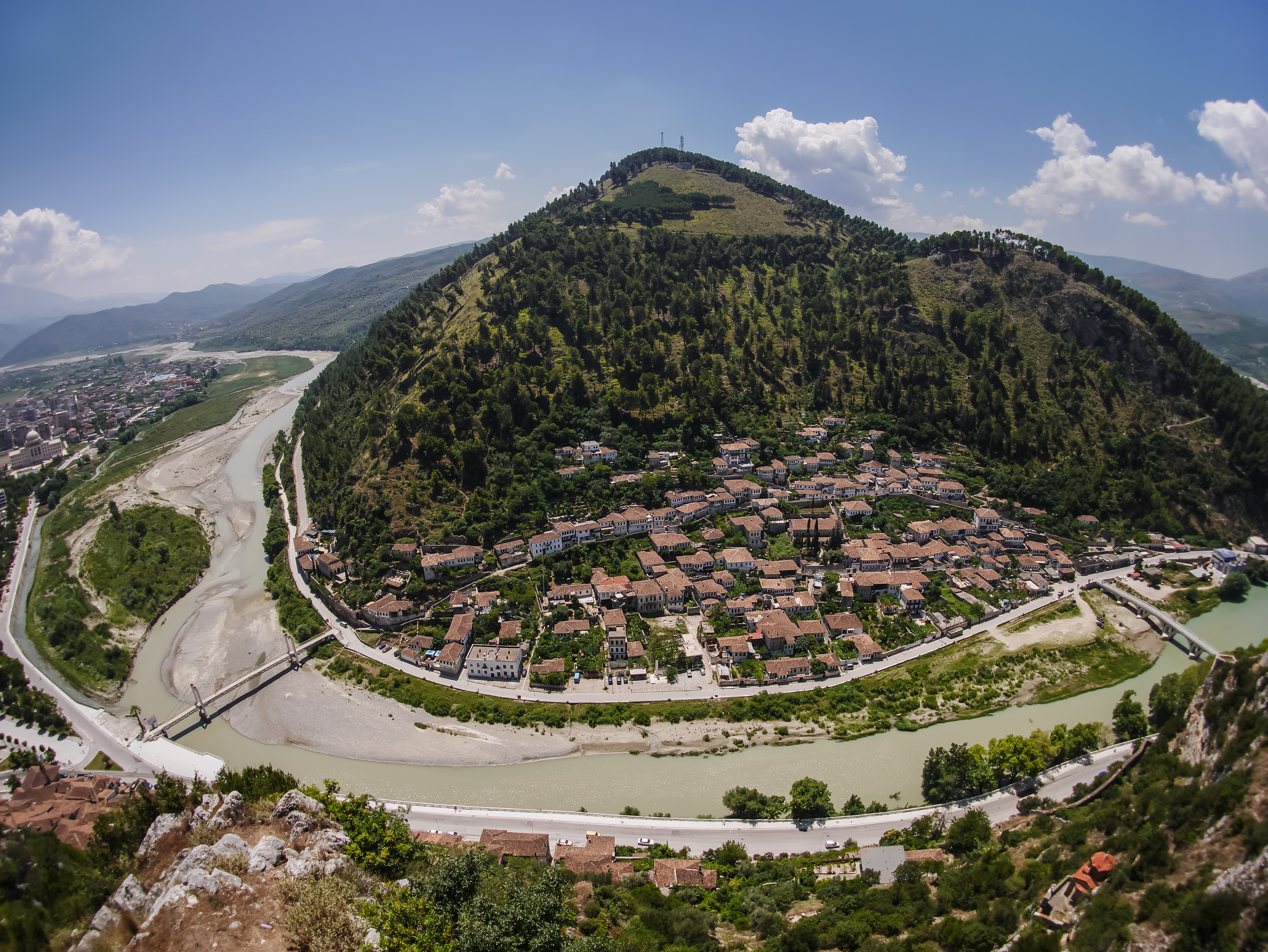
Scenic view over Gorica.

Berat, otherwise known as the city of a thousand windows, is a small city in Southern Albania. The architecture of Berat is diverse and enfolds the inheritance of the Illyrians and Ancient Greeks but also of various peoples and empires that have previously ruled the city among others the Byzantines and Ottomans. Nevertheless, the cityscape is notably embossed by the architectural style of the Ottomans and boasts a wealth of structures of exceptional historical and architectural interest. This led the city to become a UNESCO World Heritage Site.

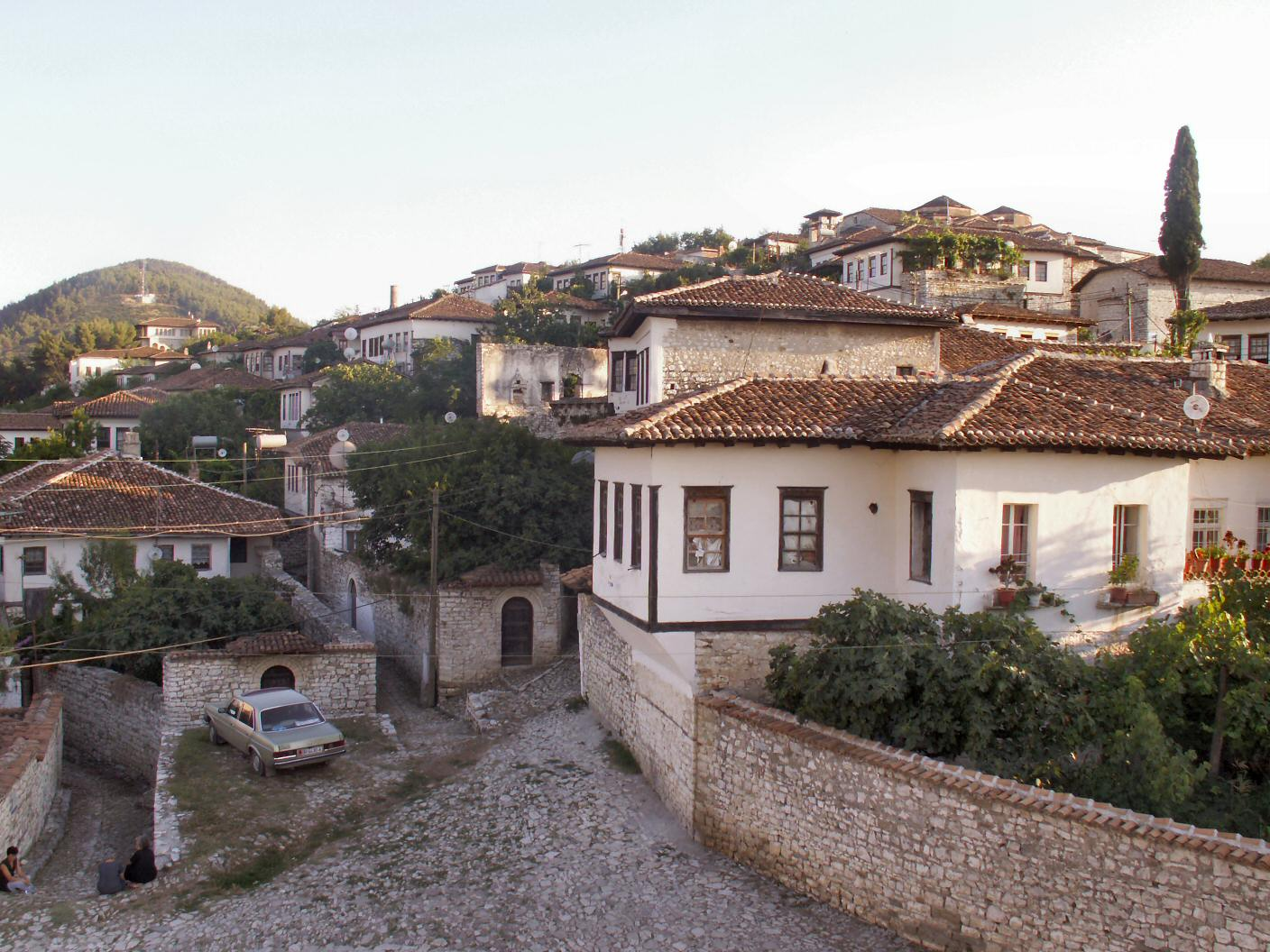
The old town of Berat is dominated by Ottoman houses.

The city is separated intro three parts such as the residential quarter within the fortress or known as Kalaja, Mangalem and Gorica. The Kalaja is believed to have been found in antiquity as it was the settlement of the Illyrian tribe of the Desaretes. Subsequently, it was known as Antipatrea when the Romans conquered the city and called it Albanorum Oppidum. Over the centuries it has been subject to numerous conquest by the Byzantines and Ottomans.

Kalaja is well-preserved and consists of numerous houses, most of which are built of stone. Numerous churches with extraordinary decorated icons and murals still survives including the Holy Trinity Church and St. Mary of Blachernae Church. Islamic architecture is represented with the ruins of the Red Mosque and White Mosque. Worth seeing is the cistern that was constructed by the Romans. The prominent Onufri Museum of Icons is also located within the castle and displays works of Onufri and other important Albanian painter.

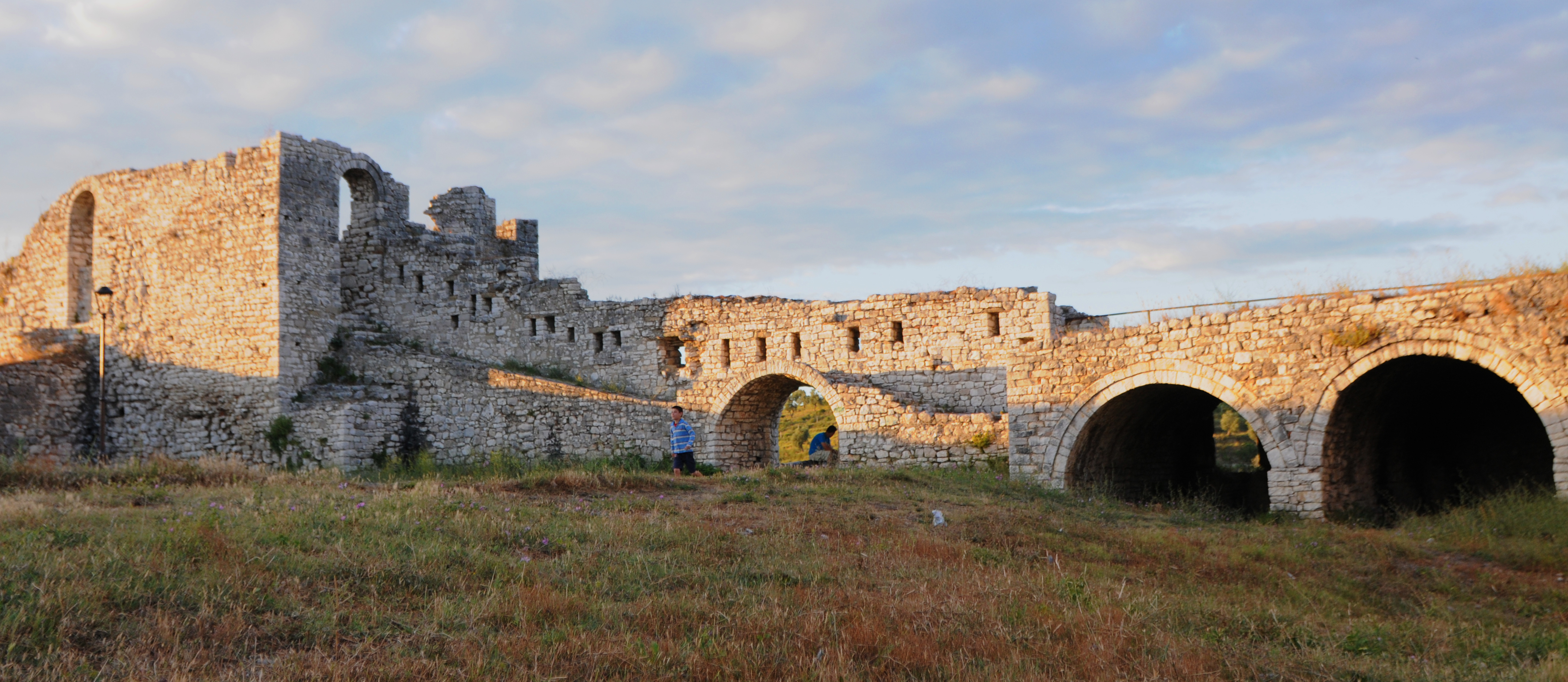
Remains of the Berat Castle.

Houses within the Mangalem quarter were built along a steep hill towards the Gorica quarter. The facades that faces the valley have characteristically overhanging windows. Therefore, Berat owes its title to the district, the "city of a thousand windows". There are three Ottoman mosques that include the King Mosque, Lead Mosque and notably the Bachelors Mosque. The Halveti Teqe stands behind the King Mosque and enclose an impressive carved ceiling.

Gorica was for a long time only connected through the Gorica Bridge to the rest of Berat. It is among the most popular Ottoman bridges in Albania that was built in 1780 by Ahmed Kurt Pasha. The Saint Spyridon Monastery is another prominent attraction due to its admirable Post-Byzantine style.

=== Korçë ===
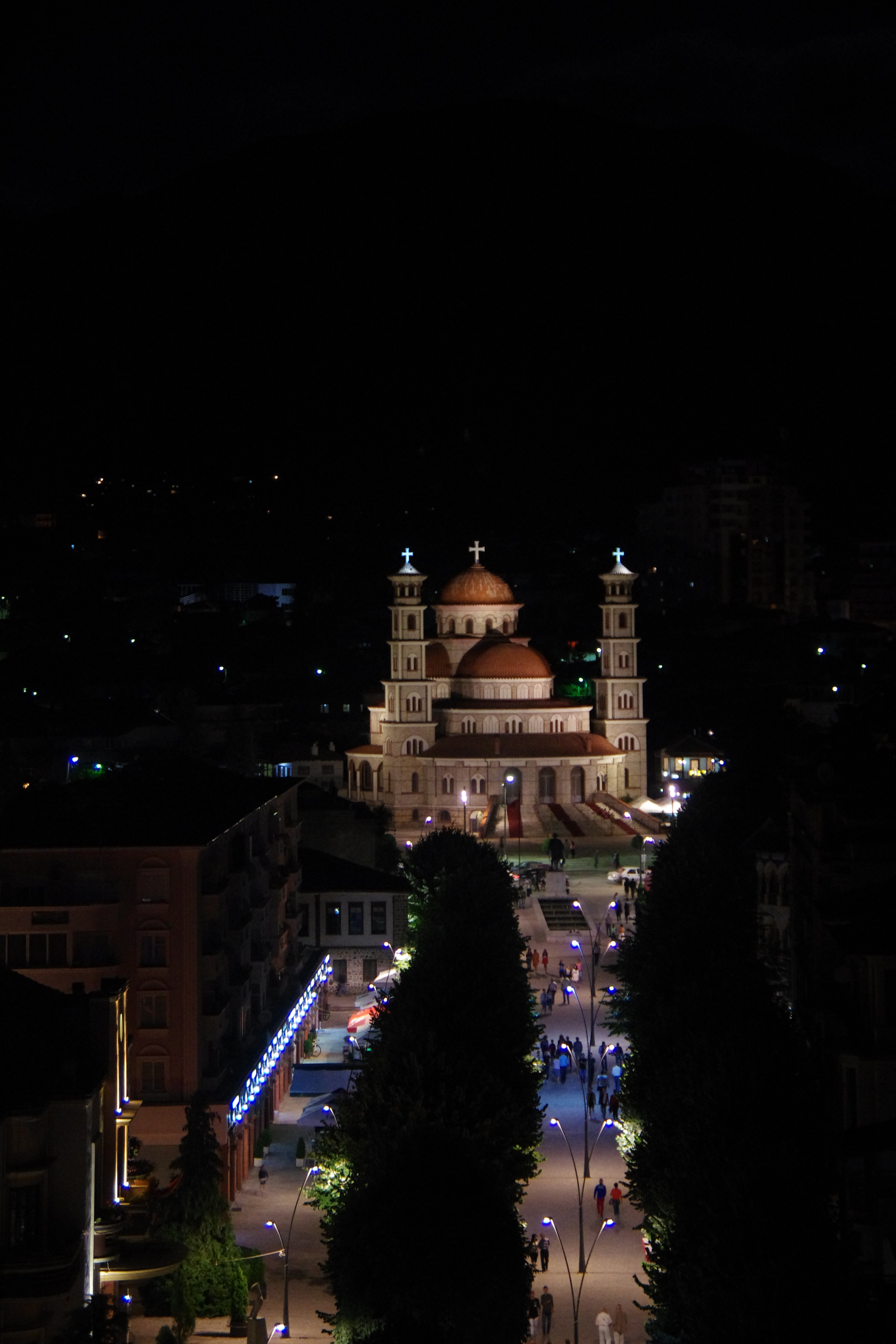
The Resurrection Cathedral in the center.

The architecture in Korçë is characterised by mansions and residential buildings, cobbled streets and wide boulevards with many cafés and restaurants. There is an architectural mix, due to the turbulent history, of Art Nouveau, Neoclassicism and Ottoman styles. Italian and French influences increased after the beginning of the nineteenth and twentieth centuries. In modernising its infrastructure through the centuries, the city has preserved some of its history in its streets and facades.

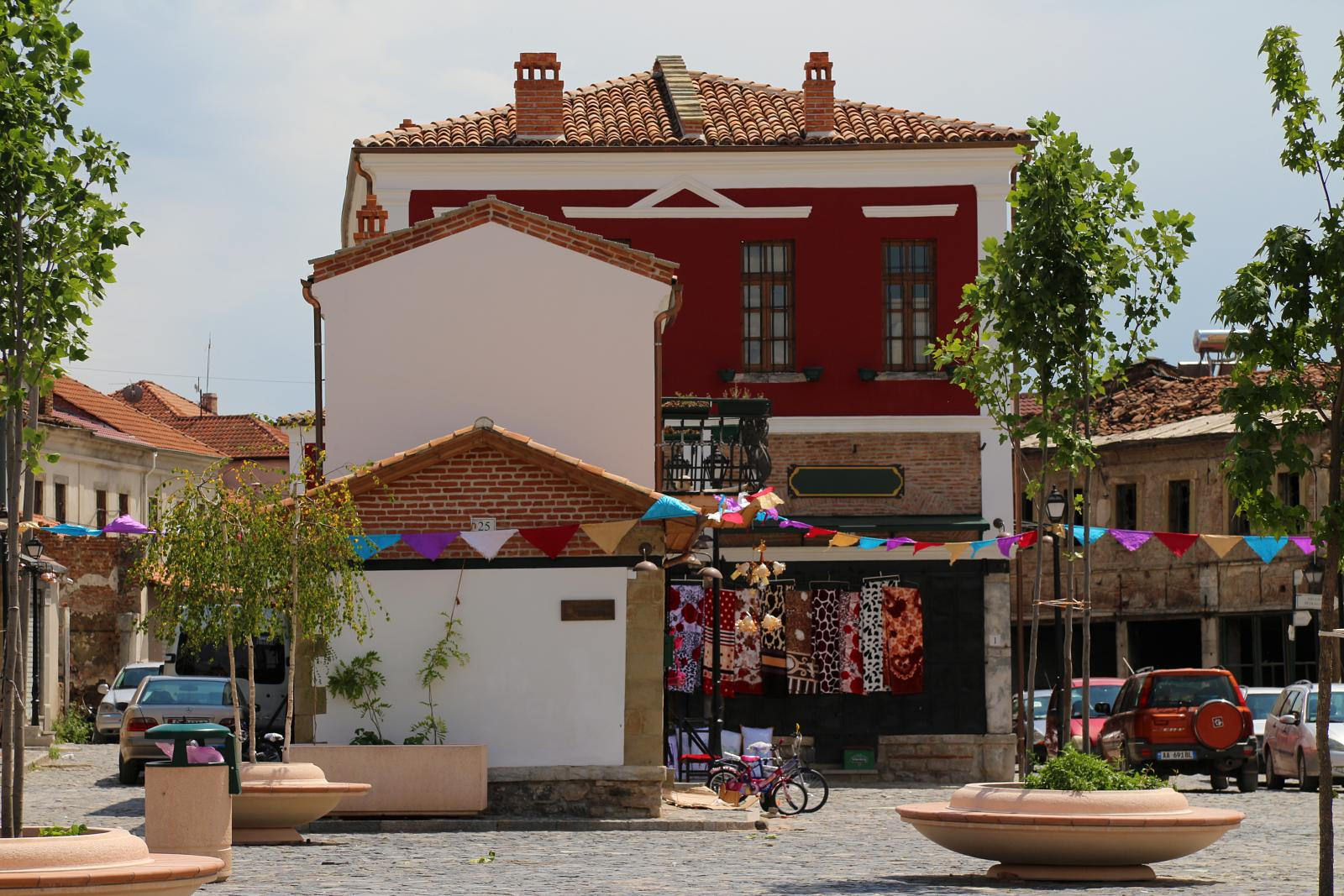
The Old Bazaar during reconstructions.

The city was an important trade and economic centre during the eighteenth century. During the Ottoman rule, the Old Bazaar developed rapidly to become the city's main centre of commerce. Although bazaars were typical Ottoman trading complexes developed in the towns of Albania and elsewhere in the Balkans. The Ottoman architecture is predominant within the bazaar, while recent reconstructions have led to the application of elements specific to modern architecture.

The Resurrection Cathedral is located in the center north of Bulevardi Republika. It is one of the largest Eastern Orthodox cathedrals in Albania, as well as one of the city's symbols and primary tourist attractions. The cathedral is a three-nave structure and belongs to Byzantine style. It stands slightly elevated on an estrade and consists mainly of cream-white to ivory-colored stones and red bricks. The interior walls and domes are decorated with icons and frescoes.

The Mirahori Mosque was built in 1484 and founded by Iljaz Bey Mirahor. The minaret and dome of the building was damaged by an earthquake and was recently restored. It consists of white limestone blocks that lie on layers of red bricks. It is only one of the few monuments of the Ottoman period in the city and the surrounding county.

== Religious architecture ==
=== Churches ===
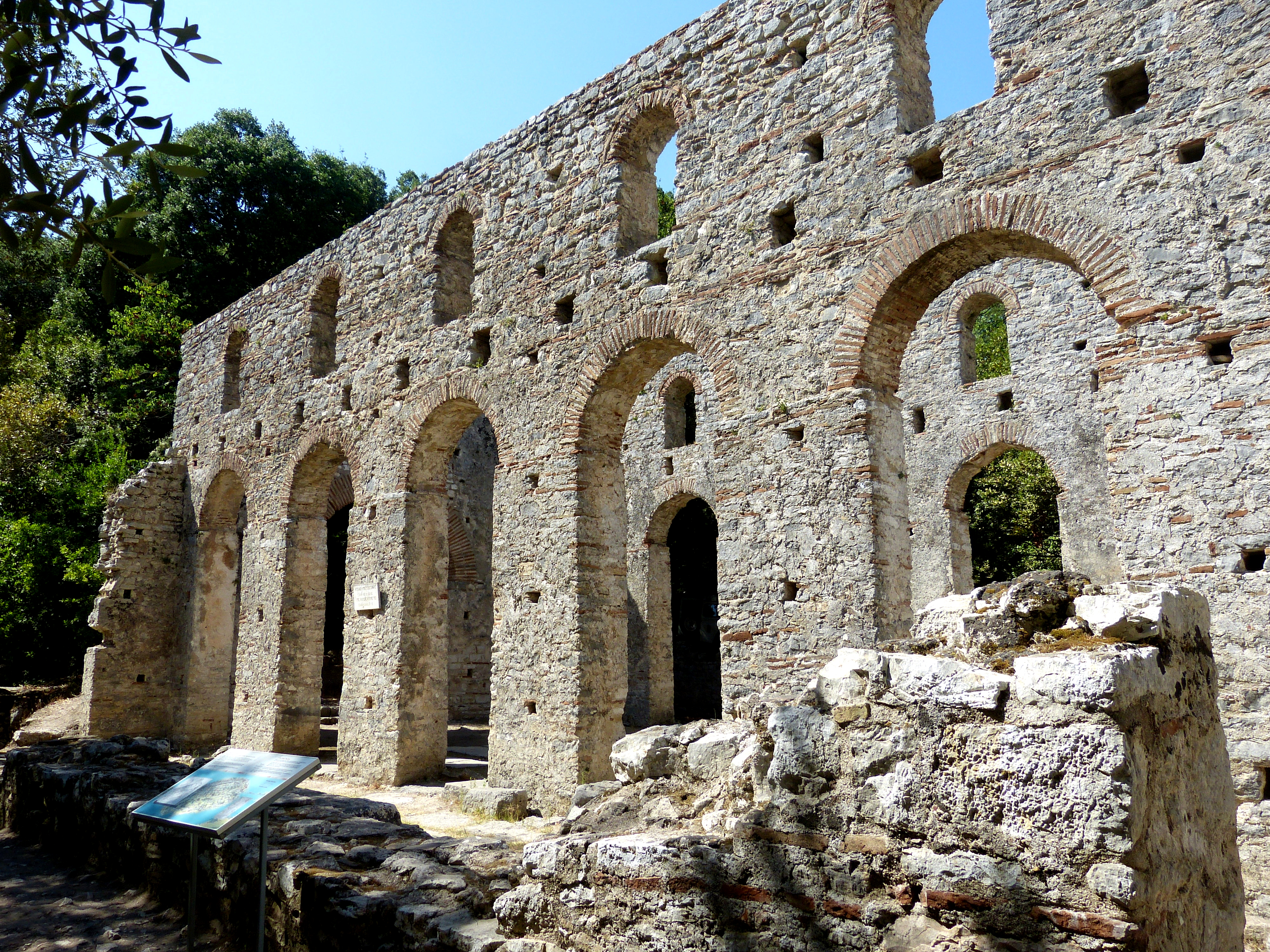
The Basilica of Butrint.

Christianity has a long and continuous history in Albania and was introduced as early as the time of the Apostles. Sacred structures, such as churches, basilicas, baptisteries, started to appear consequently after the Roman invasion of Illyria. An Early Christian architecture style developed in Albania between the 4th and 6th century. As the Roman Empire fell into east and west, the Eastern Roman Empire kept Roman architectural elements alive and became popular for its slightly flatter domes and the richer usage of murals and icons rather than statues.

The Baptistery with the Basilica of Butrint, built in the 6th century, are among the most important Early Christian buildings in the Balkan Peninsula. It is besides the Hagia Sophia in Istanbul, one of the largest baptisteries in the Mediterranean world. The most remarkable feature is its impressive mosaic floor, illustrating iconography relating both to Christianity and to Aristocratic life.

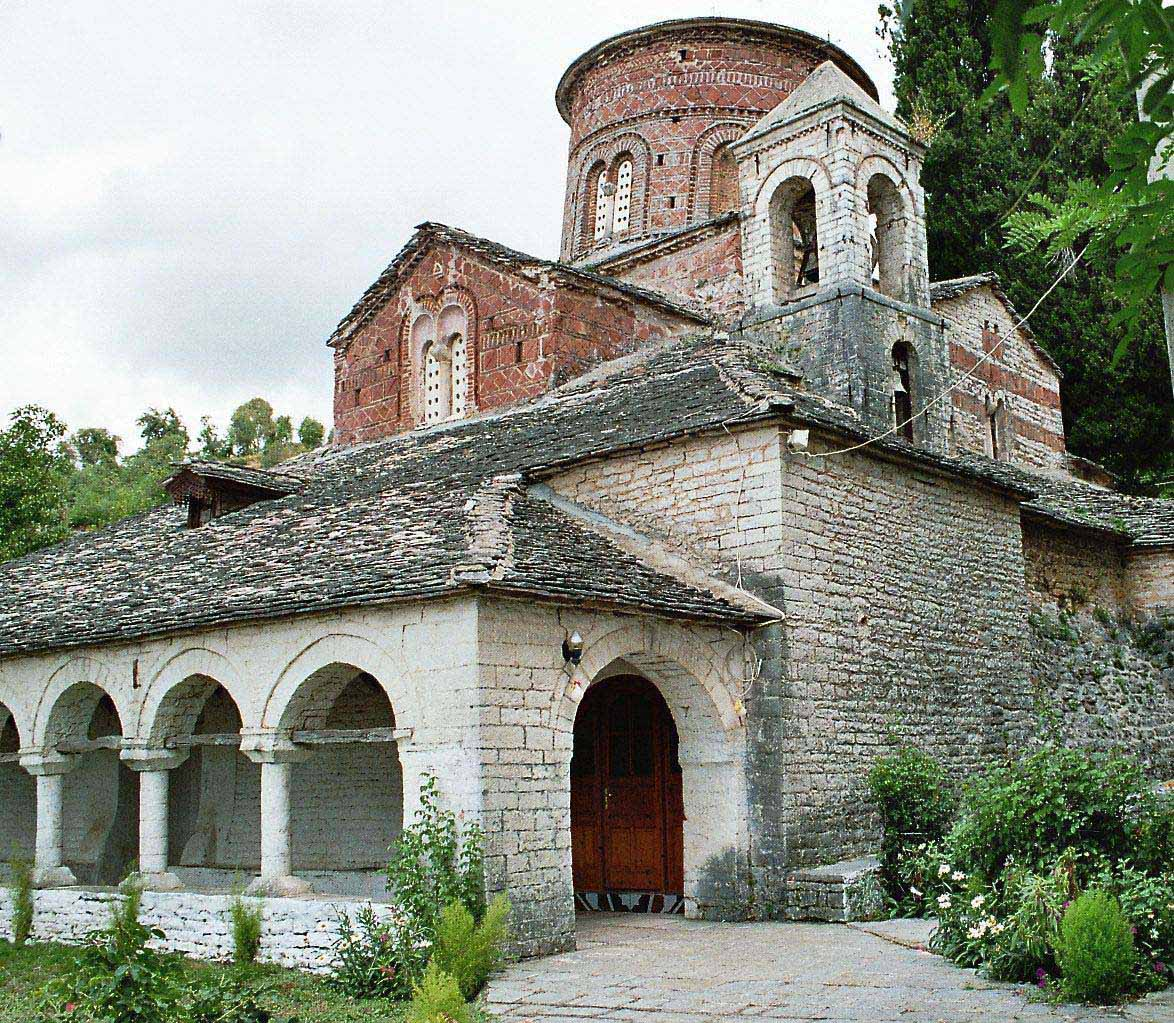
Dormition of the Theotokos Church in Labovë e Kryqit.

The Dormition of the Theotokos Church in Labovë e Kryqit is one of the greatest surviving examples of Byzantine architecture in the country. Its interior is decorated with various mosaics and frescoes and coverings of great artistic value. It is a typically Byzantine church with a high central dome with nave and aisles arranged in a cruciform plan.

The St. Anthony Church of Durrës is another important example of Byzantine architecture. It was built in the Cape of Rodon, owning a direct proximity to the Adriatic Sea. The structure was built in the 14th century and stands close to the Rodoni Castle, which was built by Gjergj Kastrioti Skanderbeg.

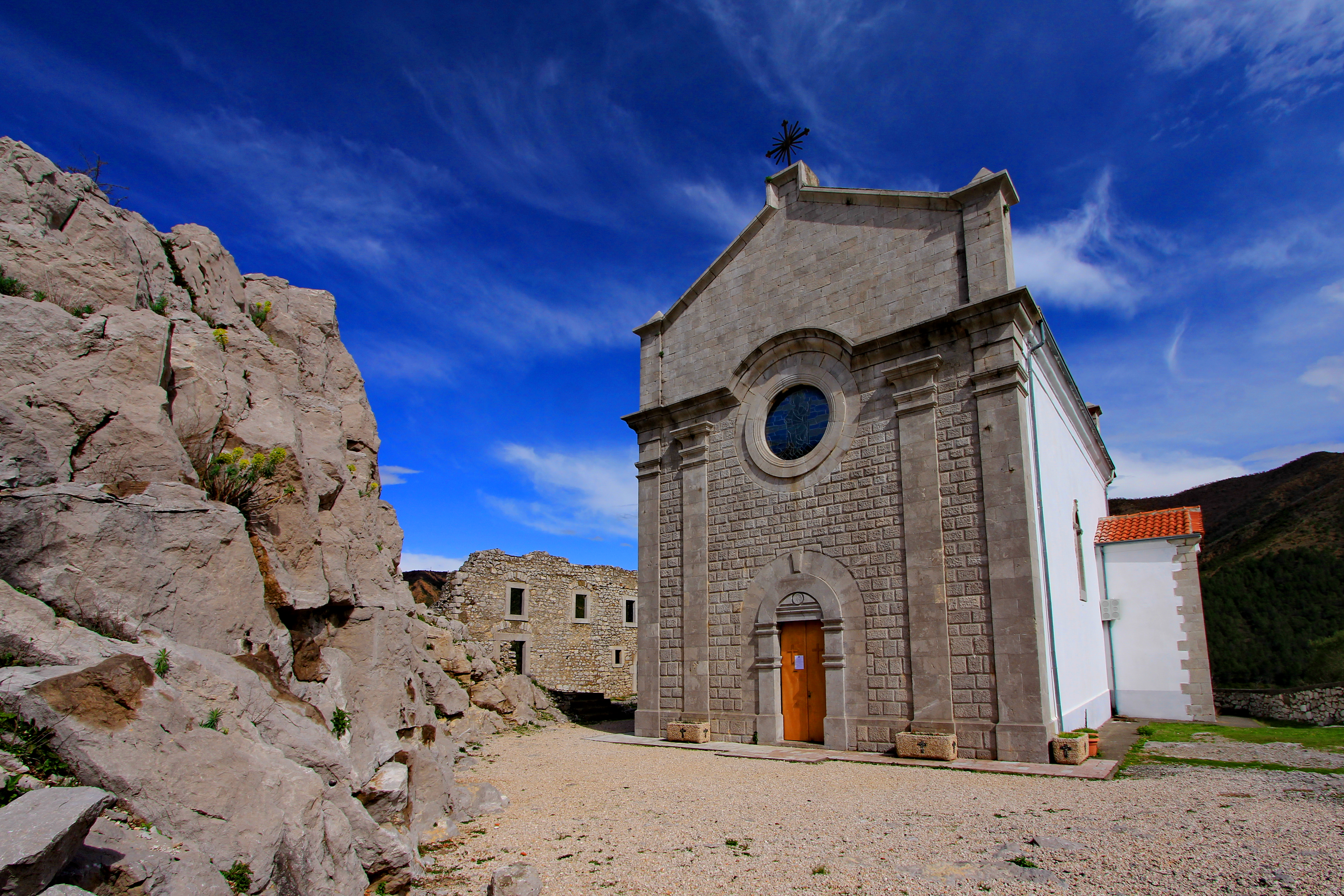
The Monastery of Rubik.

The Ardenica Monastery was built in 1282 following the victory against the Angevins in the Siege of Berat. It the place where, in 1451, was celebrated the marriage of Skanderbeg with Andronika Arianiti. The monastery is an impressive representative of Byzantine architecture with many romanesque features.

The history of Albania has not been kind to Early Christian architectural monuments. Scattered throughout the country, there are still structures and remains of churches and monasteries from that period such as the Holy Trinity Church of Berat, St. Nicholas Monastery Church in Mesopotam, St. Mary's Church of Maligrad, St. Mary of Blachernae Church of Berat, Paleochristian and Byzantine Church of Lin.

Prominent cathedrals in the country include the Cathedral of Shkodër, Resurrection Cathedral of Korçë, St Paul's Cathedral of Tirana and St. Stephen's Cathedral of Shkodër. The Resurrection Cathedral of Tirana is the 3rd largest Orthodox cathedral in Europe.

=== Mosques ===
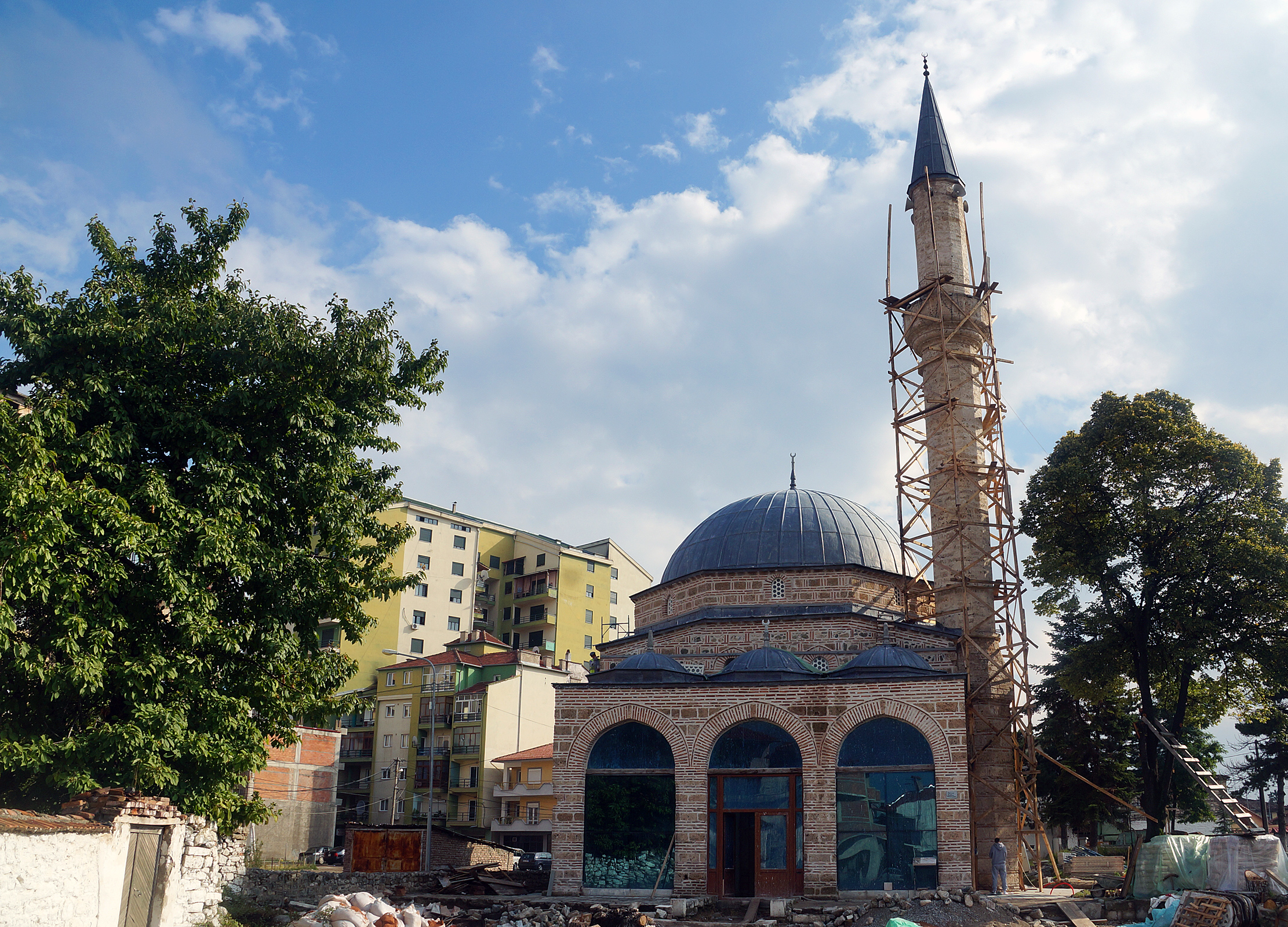
The Mirahori Mosque in Korçë.

By the late fifteenth century, the Ottoman Empire expanded its territory and conquered most of the Balkan Peninsula. In the sixteenth and seventeenth century, Islam had become the predominant religion in Albania. As with Christianity before it, the new religion were introduced subsequently the Ottoman occupation of Albania. The foreign influences that accompanied Albania, were absorbed and reinterpreted with an extensive construction of mosques throughout the country.

The combinations of brick and stone were very frequent in Ottoman architecture, while brick was used mainly for arches, domes and vaults. Further, the most characteristic feature of those mosques is the dominance of a dome, having a semi-circular flat profile, that covered the significant part of the prayer hall within the mosque. The elegance of various Islamic elements is blended in and adapted into buildings and interior designs such as the use of tiling, geometric designs, floral motifs and murals.

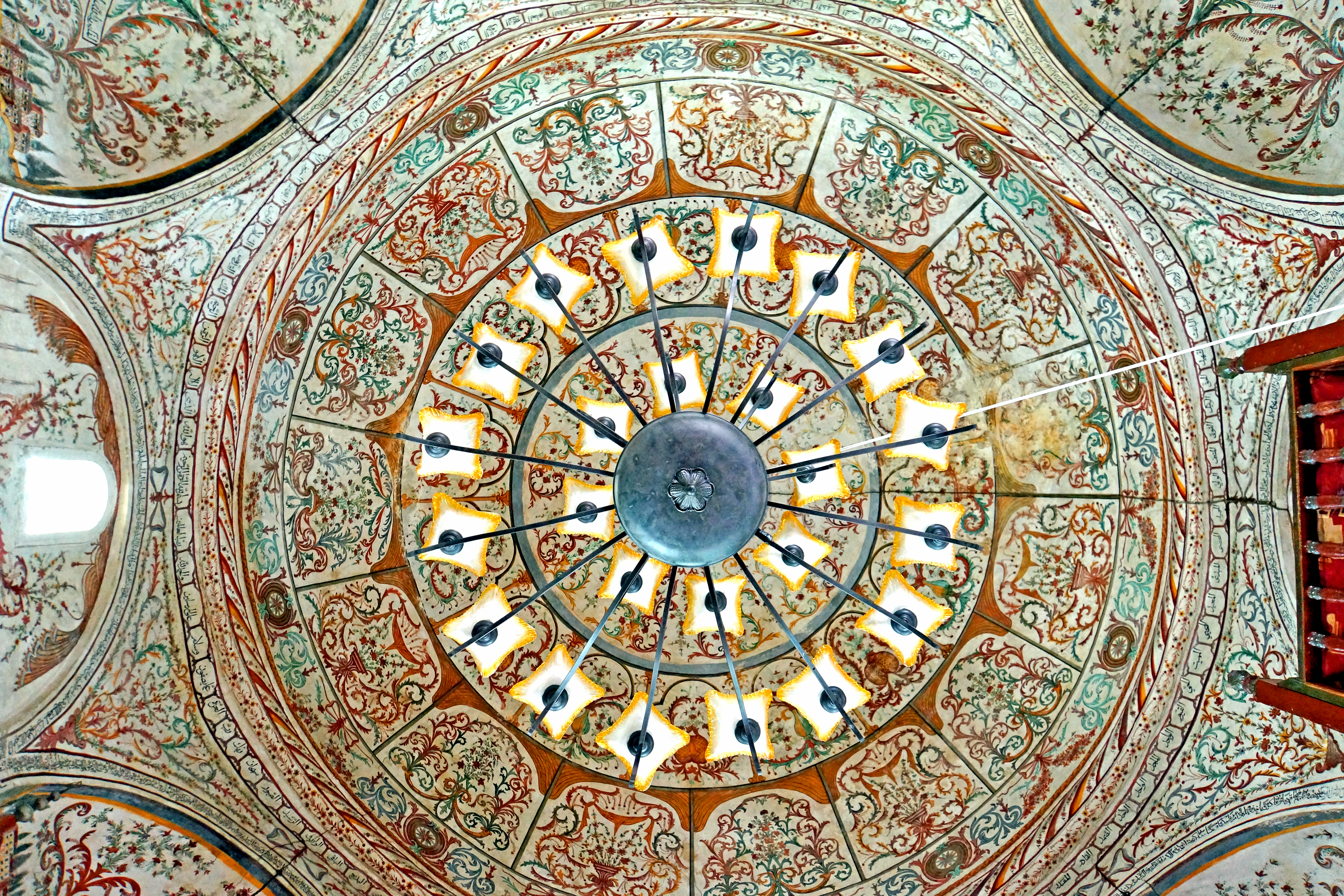
The dome of the Et'hem Bey Mosque in Tirana.

In contrast to the long presence of the Ottomans in Albania and Balkans, only few significant mosques from this period have survived, scattered particularly in the center and south of Albania. One of those mosques include the Mirahori Mosque built in 1495 by Imrahor Ilyas Bey in Korçë. It is the only existing Ottoman mosque in the city and surrounding county.

The Et'hem Bey Mosque in Tirana is an important representative of the Ottoman heritage in the country. The construction of the mosque began in the end of the 18th century and has been completed in the 19th century. Its most noted features are the frescoes within the mosque with depict trees, waterfalls and bridges.

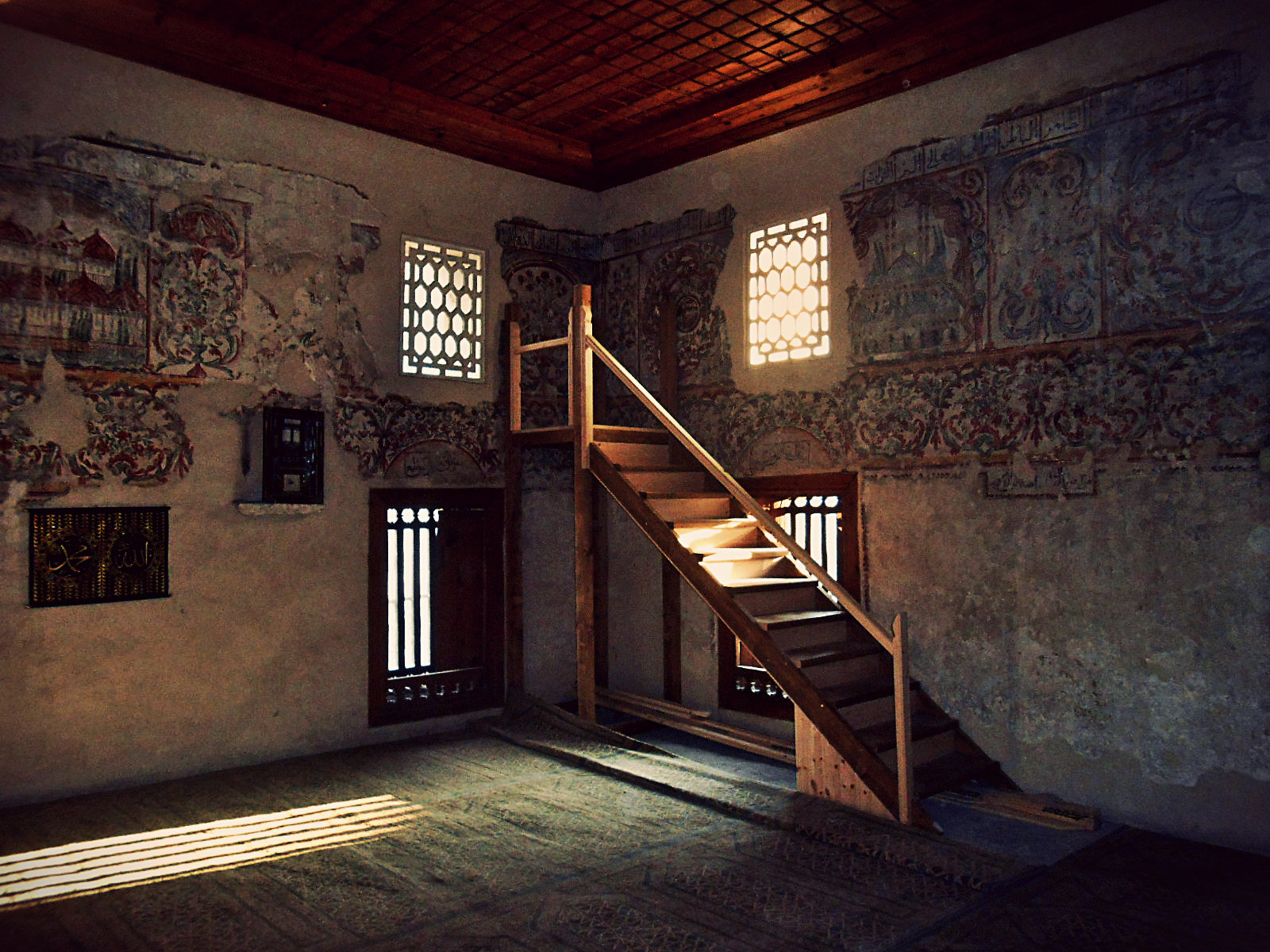
Interior of Bachelors' Mosque in Berat.

The Bachelors' Mosque is located at the lower part of Mangalem quarter of Berat, which is inscribed as a UNESCO World Heritage Site. As most of other mosques in the city, the Bachelors' Mosque was declared a Cultural Monument of Albania in 1961.

Built by Pasha Mehmed Bushati in 1773, the Lead Mosque of Shkodër is the only building left in the city that was built by the Ottomans. It takes the name because all of its cupolas were covered with lead. The mosque stands in the foothills of Mount Rozafa in a meadow along the Drin. It fell into disuse after a massive flood in 1865, which swept away that part of the city.

In Berat, the Lead Mosque, whose most characteristic feature is the lead dome, is among the best preserved Ottoman buildings in Albania. It was built during the 16th century, when Berat became an important administrative and religious center within the Ottoman Empire.

The Bazaar Mosque in Gjirokastër was built in the 18th century on a hill side close to the commercial neighbourhood of the city during that period, the bazaar, close to the Gjirokastër Fortress. Although most of the city and the mosque were constructed with portico.

=== Tekkes ===
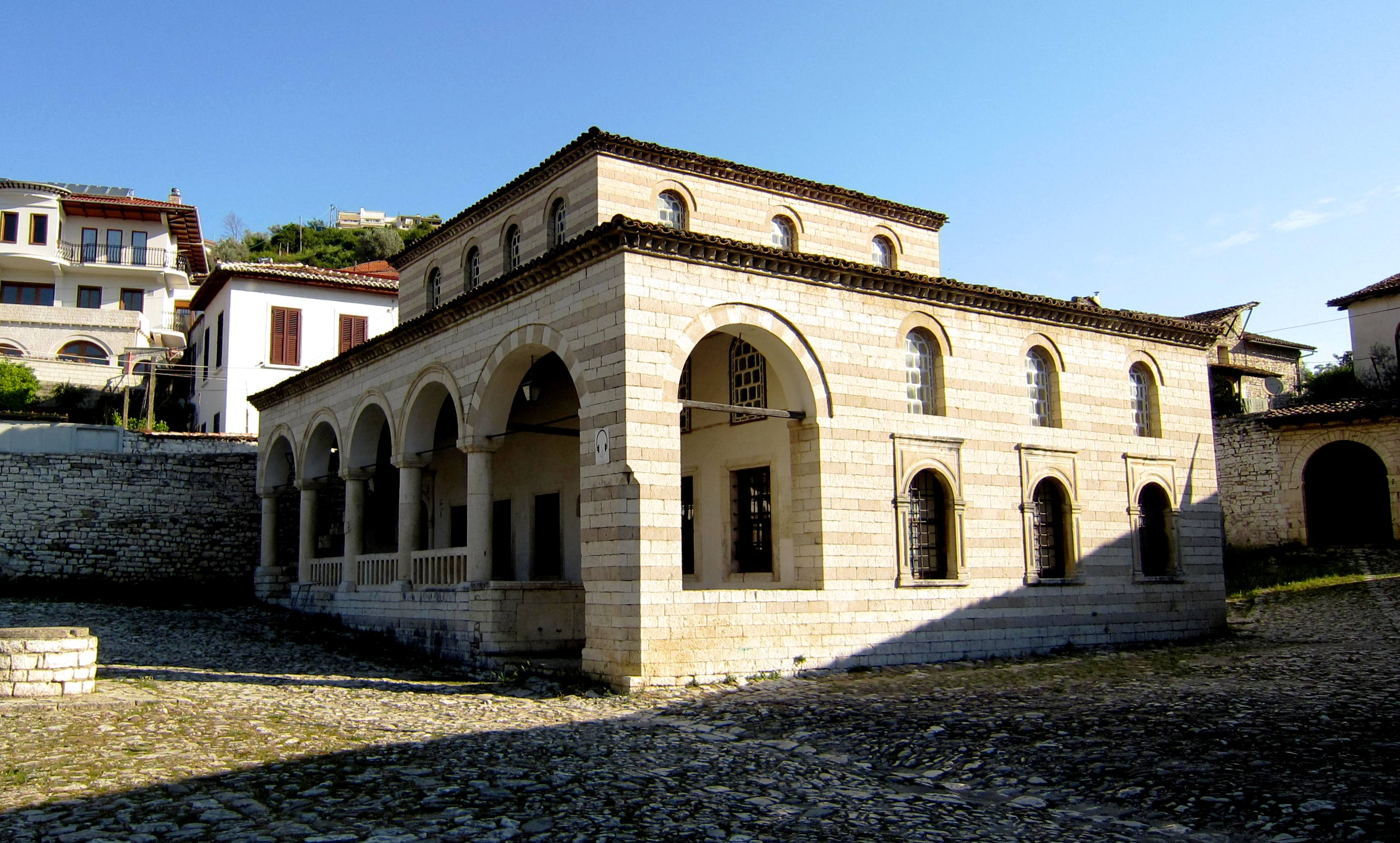
The Halveti Teqe in Berat

As the Ottoman Empire introduced Islam, the Bektashi Order spread across the Balkans and became particularly strong in Albania. Tekkes were centers of Islamic mysticism and theological provided a popular alternative to normative Islam. The architecture of tekkes is usually simple and articulated by a dome, arch, courtyard, portal, tomb and a central hall.

The Halveti Teqe was built by Albanian Ahmet Kurt Pasha in the 18th century in Berat. It is a quadratic building, that consists of a rectangular prayer room, a smaller room for special religious services, an impressive portal that precedes the entrance and a türbe. The walls within the structure are decorated with various frescoes and murals.

Built in 1770, the Dollma Teqe stands within the fortification of Krujë and includes a türbe and hamam. The flat dome rests on a low octagonal tholobate. Its interior walls are richly decorated and painted with murals and writings.

== Vernacular architecture ==
=== Kullas ===
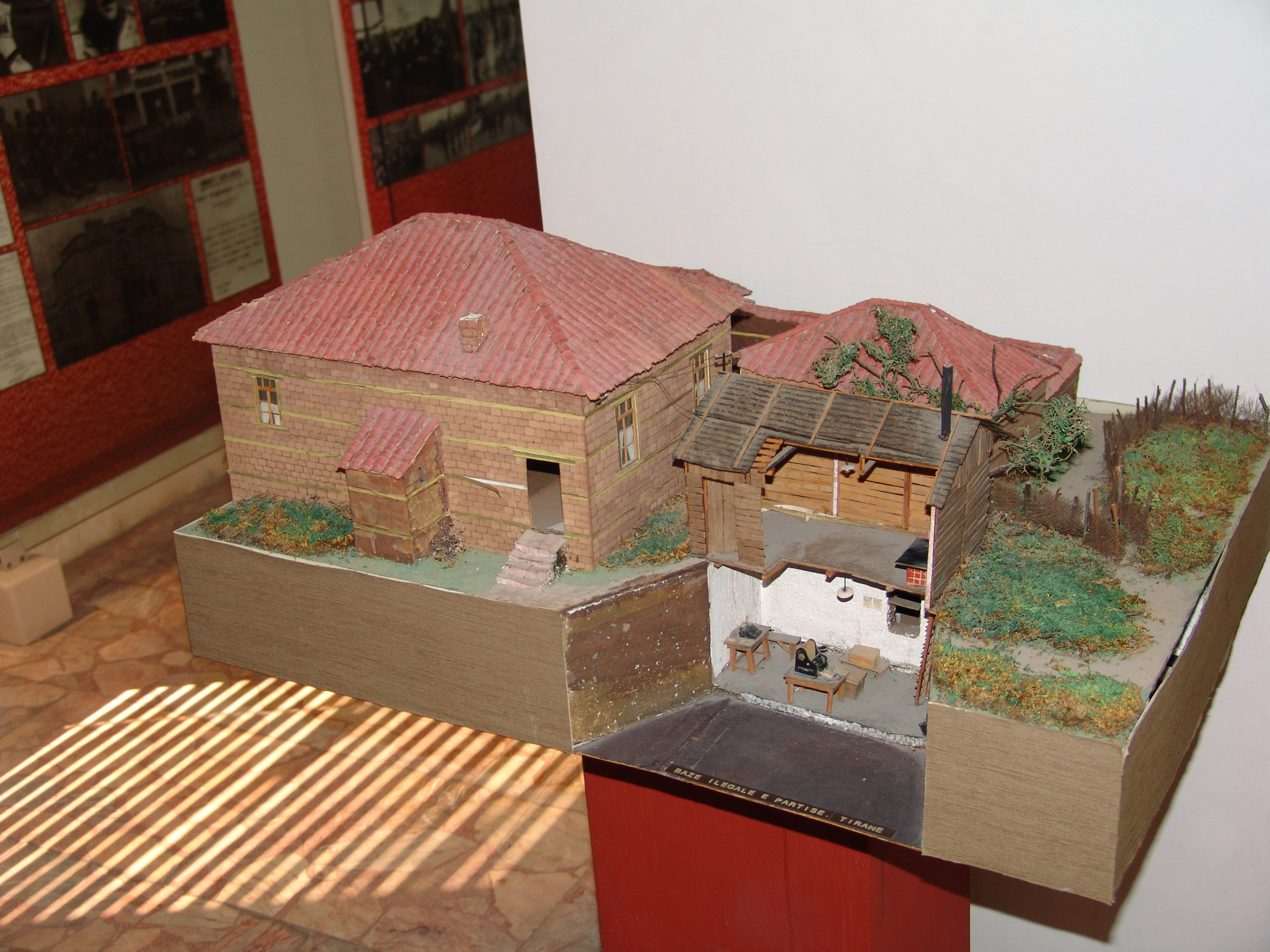
A model of an Albanian house.

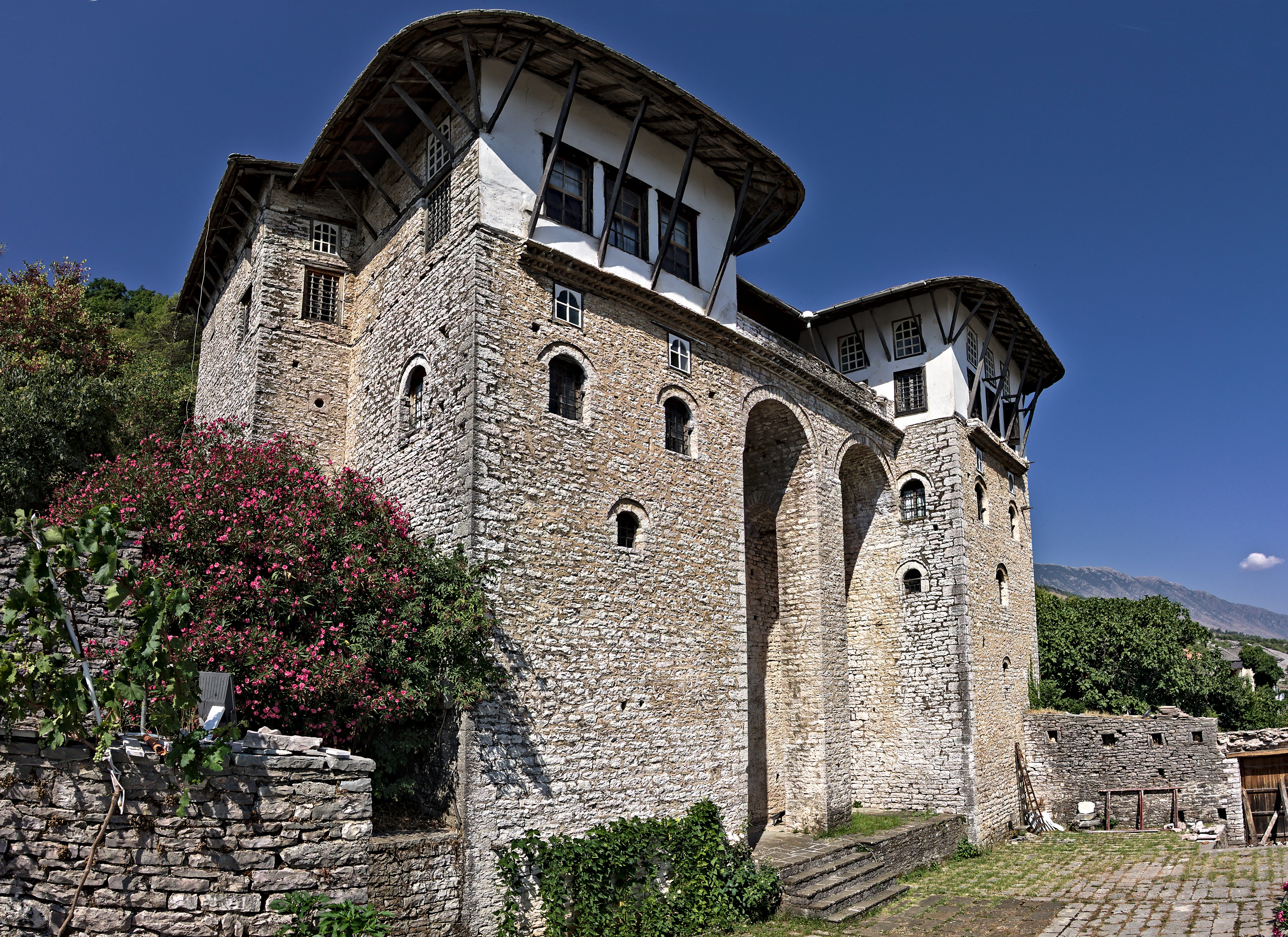
Zekate House in Gjirokastër.

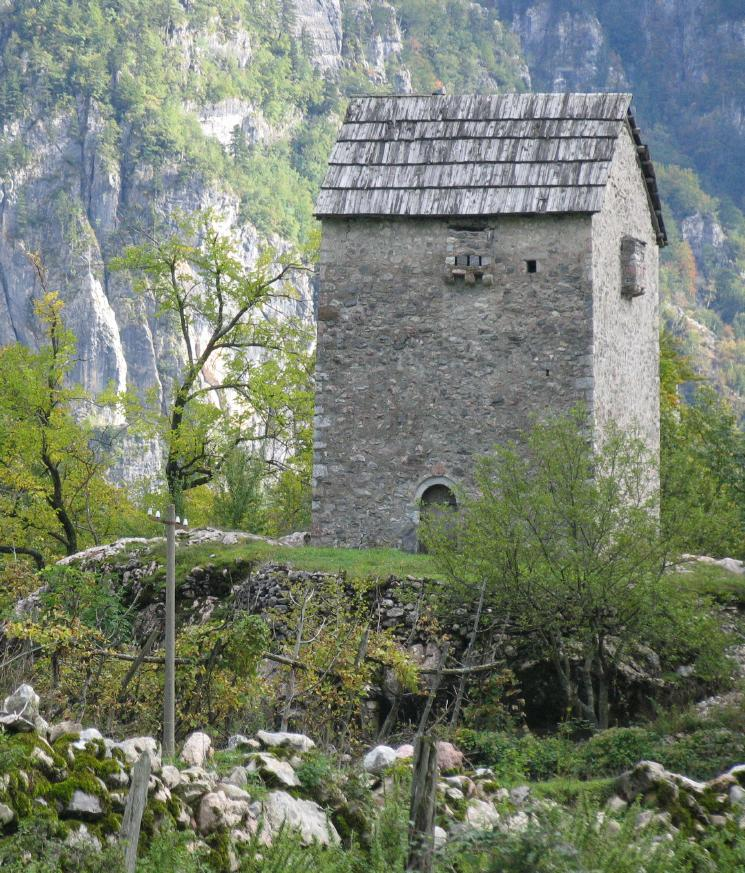
So-called "locked tower" in Theth within the Albanian Alps in the north of Albania.

Kulla were fortified tower houses that flourished between the 17th and 19th centuries as a result of resistance to the Ottoman conquest, national Renaissance and emergence of capitalism. In most cases, they take the form of an extended family house. However, a house for two brothers can also be found.

According to their spatial and planning composition, Albanian houses are classified and separated into four major groups:

- Houses with vater zjarri, or fireplace/hearth: These types of houses are primarily found in Tirana County and characterized by the house of fire (Shtëpia e Zjarrit), which takes up the height of two floors, with surrounding areas interacting around it.
- Houses with hajat, or porch: A distinguishing feature of this style is the relationship of the house with the backyard and natural environment. Oftentimes, these houses are built on flat grounds, with the ground floor used by inhabitants for agricultural purposes. For example, the Shijaku House in Tirana is surrounded by adobe walls with a large gate entrance, and almost always covered with a simple roof.
- Houses with çardak, a type of balcony found on the top floor reserved for guests or relaxation: They are mostly found in Berat, and less so in Kruje and Lezha. The cardak is a dominant element of the building's outer composition being on the main facade of the house, originally designed to be open. The cardak is extensively used by dwellers in the warm season by exploiting the natural sunlight. It also serves as liaison with other areas of the house. These houses are divided into several sub types: houses with cardak on the front area, on one side, or at the center. An example of such structures is Hajdar Sejdini House in Elbasan.
- Urban or civic kulla: They are found in Gjirokaster (see Zekate House), Berat, Kruje, and Shkoder used for defensive and warehouse purposes. The interior showed the extent of family's wealth, while the ground floor served as a safe place for cattle in the winter, and to keep water reserves for the dry summer months.

The southern urban or civic Kullas are found in the cities and surroundings of Berat, Gjirokastër, Himara and Këlcyrë. Tower-houses in Gjirokastër were built in the 13th century predating Ottoman conquest. The northern Kullas are a heavily fortified residential building built in the north of Albania and Dukagjin region of Kosovo. They contain small windows and shooting holes because their main purpose was to offer security from attack. Further they have been initially built from wood and stone and eventually only from stone.

The first Kullas were built in the 17th century, a time when there was continuous fighting in the Dukagjini region, although most of the ones that still remain are from the 18th or 19th century. They have been almost always built within a complex of buildings with various functions but Kullas in villages exists mostly as standalone structures. They are also positioned within the complex of buildings so that the inhabitants can look out over the surrounding area. Kullas in towns are usually built as standalone structures, while in villages they are more commonly found as a part of a larger ensemble of Kullas and stone houses, usually grouped together for the family clan they belonged to.

Certain Kullas were used as places of isolation and safe havens or "locked towers" (Kulla Ngujimi) intended for the use of persons targeted by blood feuds; an example can be found in Theth.

Most of the Kullas are three-story buildings. A characteristic unit of its architectural structure in "Oda e Burrave" (Chamber of Men or Gathering Room of Men), which was usually placed in the second floor of the Kulla, called Divanhane, while the ground floor served as a barn for cattle and the first floor was where the family quarters were located. The material from which the Divanhane is constructed, either wood or stone, is sometimes used to classify Kullas.

== See also ==
- Albanian art
- Culture of Albania
- Tourism of Albania
