= Krasniqi (surname) =

Krasniqi (Albanian pronunciation: [kɾas'nici]) is an Albanian surname. It is the most common surname in Kosovo. Notable people with the surname include:

- Adrijana Krasniqi (born 1997), Albanian-Swedish singer-songwriter and rapper
- Agim Krasniqi (born 1951), Albanian rebel commander
- Agim Krasniqi (politician), Albanian economist, civil servant and politician
- Albin Krasniqi, multiple people
- Ali Krasniqi (1952–2024), Kosovar Roma writer and activist
- Arben Krasniqi (born 1974), Kosovan basketball coach
- Arjanit Krasniqi (born 1999), midfielder
- Armela Krasniqi (born 1976), Albanian journalist and public official
- Artur Krasniqi (born 1977), Kosovo Protestant Evangelical Church leader
- Besnik Krasniqi (born 1990), Kosovan footballer
- Bledian Krasniqi (born 2001), Swiss-Kosovan footballer
- Blerim Krasniqi (born 1996), Albanian footballer
- Bleron Krasniqi (born 2002), Kosovan footballer
- Demir Krasniqi (born 1950), Kosovan musician and journalist
- Dion Krasniqi (born 2003), Kosovan footballer
- Distria Krasniqi (born 1995), Kosovan judoka
- Elbert Krasniqi (born 1986), Kosovar politician and communist
- Ermal Krasniqi (born 1998), Kosovan footballer
- Florin Krasniqi (born 1964), Kosovar-American businessman, activist, politician, and one-time arms smuggler
- Gaspër Krasniqi (died 1876), Roman Catholic Vicar Apostolic of the Diocese of Skopje
- Gëzim Krasniqi (born 1990), Albanian footballer
- Hysni Krasniqi (born 1942), Albanian painter
- Ilir Krasniqi (born 2000), Kosovan footballer
- Islam Krasniqi, Kosovan didactician, educational theorist and university professor
- Jakup Krasniqi (born 1951), Albanian politician
- Jetmir Krasniqi (born 1995), Swiss footballer
- Kamer Krasniqi (born 1996), Kosovan footballer
- Kreshnic Krasniqi (born 1994), Kosovan footballer
- Kreshnik Krasniqi (born 2000), footballer
- Laurit Krasniqi (born 2001), Kosovan footballer
- Liridon Krasniqi (born 1992), Kosovo Albanian footballer
- Luan Krasniqi (born 1971), German boxer
- Mark Krasniqi (1920–2015), Albanian scholar
- Matej Krasniqi (1763-1827 or 1829), Roman Catholic Archbishop
- Mazhar Krasniqi (1931–2019), New Zealand Muslim community leader
- Memli Krasniqi (born 1980), Kosovar singer-songwriter, musician and politician
- Mergim Krasniqi (born 1992), Swedish footballer
- Mujë Krasniqi (1967–1998), Albanian military personnel
- Olsi Krasniqi (born 1992), Albanian-born English rugby league player
- Qendresa Krasniqi (born 1994), Albanian footballer
- Rexhep Krasniqi (1906–1999), Albanian politician, historian, and nationalist
- Robin Krasniqi (born 1987), German boxer
- Shefqet Krasniqi (born 1966), Kosovar Muslim cleric and Islamist
- Shkelqim Krasniqi (born 1996), Swedish footballer
- Vanessa Krasniqi (born 1994), Albanian-German singer
- Zana Krasniqi (born 1988), Kosovar beauty pageant winner
