= List of people from Prizren =

The following are notable people who were either born, raised or have lived for a significant period of time in Prizren.

== List ==
- Almen Abdi, Swiss international football player
- Anton Atanasov, Bulgarian from the Bulgarian Volunteer Corps
- Nikola Evtov, Bulgarian from the Macedonian-Adrianopolitan Volunteer Corps during the Balkan wars (1912–1913)
- Aleksa Mandušić (also known as Jake Allex), Serbian-American Medal of Honor recipient
- Süleyman Askerî, army officer of the Ottoman Empire.
- Arjan Beqaj, Albanian international football player
- Llukë Bogdani, Albanian poet
- Pjetër Bogdani, Albanian writer
- Nikollë Bojaxhiu, Albanian businessman, politician, and the father of Mother Teresa
- Burim Myftiu, Visual Artist, Curator and Photographer
- Petrit Çeku, Albanian classical guitarist
- Bersant Celina, Albanian-Norwegian footballer
- Ivan Iliev, Bulgarian from the Macedonian-Adrianopolitan Volunteer Corps during the Balkan wars (1912–1913)
- Ivica Dačić, Serbian politician, former Prime Minister of Serbia
- Ylfete Fanaj, politician
- Bekim Fehmiu, Albanian actor
- Dimitar Simov, Bulgarian from the Bulgarian Volunteer Corps
- Elder Grigorije, Serbian Orthodox clergyman and writer
- Shaban Gashi, Cinematographer and photographer
- Sima Andrejević Igumanov, Serbian merchant who made a fortune through tobacco trade
- Vuk Isaković, Serb military commander in Austrian service during the Austrian-Ottoman Wars
- Voycho (Kolcho) Vassilev, Bulgarian from the Bulgarian Volunteer Corps
- Joanikije II, first Serbian Patriarchate of Peć
- Trifon Lukich, Bulgarian from the Macedonian-Adrianopolitan Volunteer Corps during the Balkan wars (1912–1913)
- Katarina Josipi, Albanian actress
- Anđelko Karaferić, Serbian musician, Professor of Counterpoint and Associate Dean at the University of Pristina Faculty of Arts
- Matej Krasniqi, Albanian Catholic cleric
- Lazar the Serb, Serbian Orthodox monk who invented and built the first known mechanical public clock in Russia in 1404
- Milosh Nedelkov, Bulgarian from the Macedonian-Adrianopolitan Volunteer Corps during the Balkan wars (1912–1913)
- Mark Marku, Albanian singer
- Toma Bogdanovich, a Bulgarian from the Bulgarian Volunteer Corps
- Nikola Bogdanov (1841 – 1919), Bulgarian military from the Bulgarian Volunteer Corps
- Petar of Koriša, first Serbian anachoretic saint of Medieval Kingdom of Serbia
- Petar Kostić, Serbian writer, Orthodox priest, national worker, and rector of Prizren seminary
- Pjetër Mazreku, Albanian Archbishop of Bar and Bishop of Prizren
- Petar Pavlov, Bulgarian from the Macedonian-Adrianopolitan Volunteer Corps during the Balkan wars (1912–1913)
- Stancho Pavlov, Bulgarian from the Macedonian-Adrianopolitan Volunteer Corps during the Balkan wars (1912–1913)
- Slobodan Surčević Boro, Serbian partisan
- Stoyan Angelov, Bulgarian from the Macedonian-Adrianopolitan Volunteer Corps during the Balkan wars (1912–1913)
- Stoyan Simich, a Bulgarian priest in Northern Dobrudja
- Arta Muçaj, Albanian actress
- Dejan Musli, Serbian basketball player
- Vedat Muriqi, Albanian footballer
- Luka Christov Pavlov, Bulgarian from the Macedonian-Adrianopolitan Volunteer Corps during the Balkan wars (1912–1913)
- Jordan Nikolić, Serbian folk singer who interpreted traditional songs from Kosovo
- Ymer Prizreni, founding member and leader of the League of Prizren
- Agim Shala, UÇK fighter in the Battle of Vërrin
- Kujtim Shala, former Croatian international football player
- Čolak Anta Simeonović, Serbian commander and one of the most important figures of the First Serbian Uprising
- Nenad Stojković, Serbian football player
- Tayna, Albanian singer
- Edis Tatli, Finnish boxer
- Xhevdet Doda, Albanian teacher and partisan
