= Krasniqi =

Region in the Accursed Mountains of northeastern Albania; historic Albanian tribe

Coordinates: 42°11′N 20°18′E

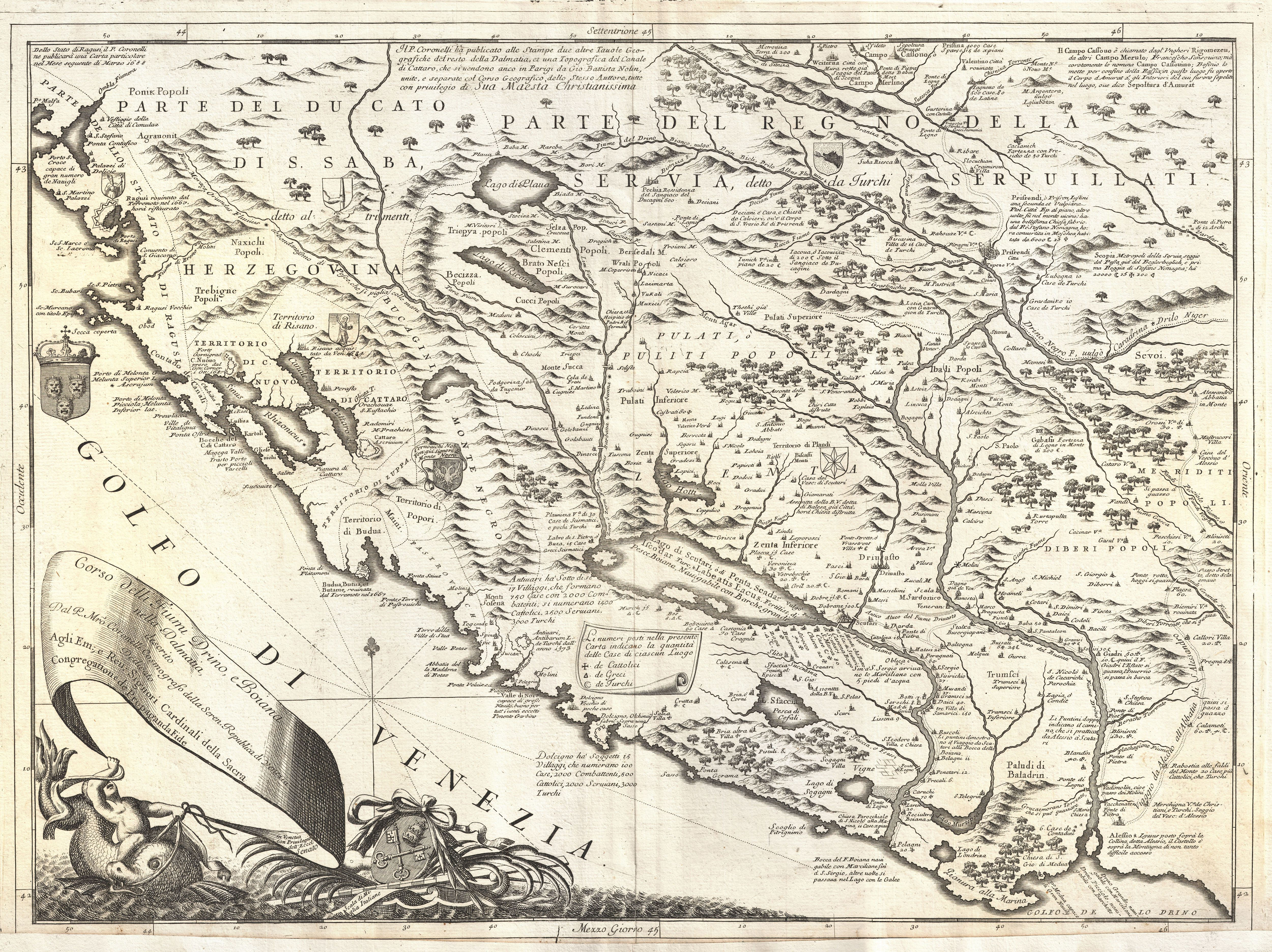
Grastenicchia Fiume (the river of Krasniqja, Valbona) in 1688 by Venetian cartographer, Vincenzo Coronelli

Krasniqi is a historical Albanian tribe and region in the Accursed Mountains in northeastern Albania, bordering Kosovo. The region lies within the Tropoje District and is part of a wider area between Albania and Kosovo that is historically known as Gjakova highlands (Highlands of Gjakova). Krasniqi stretches from the Valbona river in the north to Lake Fierza in the south and includes the town Bajram Curri. Members of the Krasniqi tribe are also found in Kosovo and North Macedonia.

== Geography ==
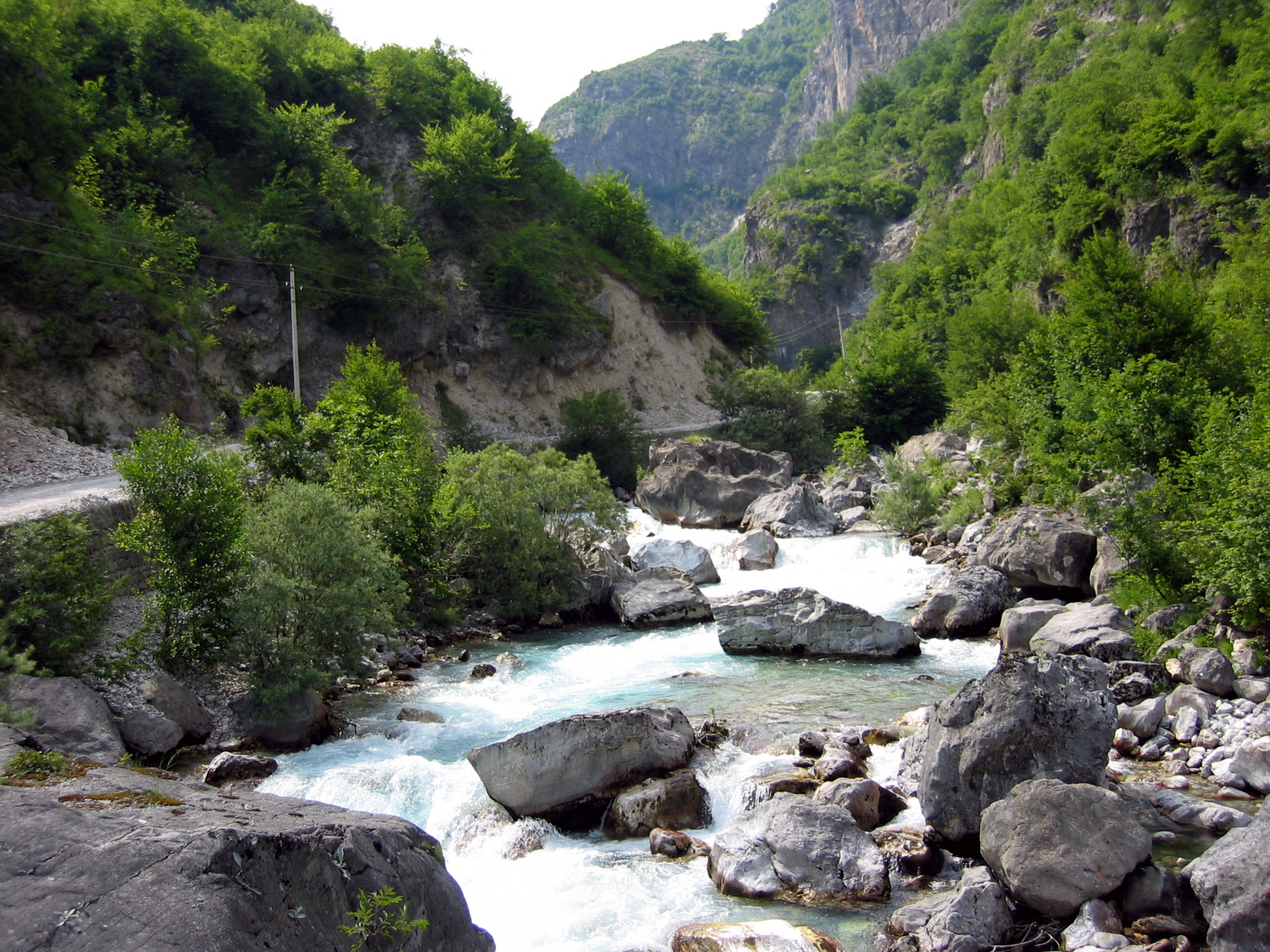
Valbona

The region is called Krasniqe (Krasniqja in definite Albanian) and its people are called Krasniqë. The Krasniqi region is situated in the District of Tropoja and stretches from the Montenegrin border in the north to Lake Fierza in the south, from the Mërturi region in the west to the District of Has in the east, and includes most of the upper Valbona valley. It borders on the traditional tribal regions of Bugjoni to the south, Gashi to the northeast, Nikaj-Mërtur to the west, and Bytyçi to the east. The main settlements of the region are the town of Bajram Curri, Bujan, Shoshan, Kocanaj, Dragobia, Bradoshnicë, Degë, Llugaj, Murataj, Margegaj, Lëkurtaj, Bunjaj.

Krasniqi has its roots in the highlands of Gjakova, but over the centuries has spread to neighbouring areas. Thus, today many descendants of the Krasniqi fis are found within present-day Kosovo, especially in the western part (to the east of Krasniqi itself), having settled there since late 17th century. On the Kumanovo side of the Skopska Crna Gora, descendants of the Krasniqi fis were recorded in the villages of Gošince, Slupčane, Alaševce (in Lipkovo) and Ruđince (in Staro Nagoričane) in 1965. A group of them migrated to Istanbul.

== Oral traditions ==
Oral traditions and fragmentary stories were collected and interpreted by writers who travelled in the region in the 19th century about the early history of Krasniqi. Johann Georg von Hahn recorded the first oral tradition about Krasniqi's origins from a Catholic priest named Gabriel in Shkodra in 1850. According to this account, the first direct male ancestor of the Krasniqi was Kastër Keqi, son of a Catholic Albanian named Keq who fleeing from Ottoman conquest settled in the Slavic-speaking area that would become the historical Piperi tribal region in what is now Montenegro. His sons, the brothers Lazër Keqi (ancestor of Hoti, Ban Keqi (ancestor of Triepshi), Merkota Keqi (ancestor of Mrkojevići) and Vas Keqi (ancestor of Vasojevići) had to abandon the village after committing murder against the locals, but Keq and his younger son Piper Keqi remained there and Piper Keqi became the direct ancestor of the Piperi tribe. The name of the first ancestor, Keq, which means bad in Albanian, is given in Malësia to only children or to children from families with very few children (due to infant mortality). In those families, an "ugly" name (i çudun) was given as a spoken talisman to protect the child from the "evil eye. The name Kastër has also been recorded as Krasno, Kras or Krasto.

Edith Durham recorded a similar story from Marash Uci, elder of Hoti. According the story, the ancestors of the Krasniqi are said to have stemmed from Bosnia and migrated through Montenegro to the area of Reç, north of Shkodra. Then, sometime after 1600, they moved inland to the area of Dushaj i Epërm, east of Fierza, in what is broadly their present region. Here they took over land that had been settled by the Gashi and gradually drove the latter tribe eastwards. In the process of establishing themselves as a tribal unit, they also drove the Thaçi westwards across the Drin River. The reference to Bosnia might actually refer to the region of Plav (eastern Montenegro), where the mountains of Hoti (malet e Hotit) are located.

The name Kastër and its variants correspond to a settlement that appears in the Decani chrysobulls of 1330 as Krastavljane and in the defter of the sanjak of Scutari in 1485 as Hrasto. This toponym's etymology probably comes from the Slavic word hrasto (oak). It had ten households and its head household was that of Petri, son of Gjonima. One of the household heads, Nika Gjergj Bushati was related to the Bushati fis. Villages that later were part of Krasniqi that appear in the defter of 1485 are Shoshan (20 households) and Dragobia (six households). These villages were not part of the same community or the same administrative unit as other tribes of northern Albania and Montenegro like Hoti or Piperi which were in the process of their final formation at that time.

Most Krasniqi form a fis (tribe) in the sense that they are patrilineally descended from the same male progenitor. Most brotherhoods of Krasniqi come from Kolë Mekshi who lived in the mid 16th century. After 1550, he and his brother Nikë Mekshi are acknowledged as the first, historical, direct ancestors of the Krasniqi and Nikaj tribes. To Kolë Mekshi trace their descend the Kolmekshaj brotherhoods and their branches. They form the population of Shoshan and Dragobia. They also founded Bradoshnicë, Degë, Kocanaj, Murataj and Margegaj.

== Genetics ==
Lauka et al. (2022) tested Krasniqi and Nikaj men to test the correlation of oral traditions with genetic data. The Krasniqi and Nikaj men have the same patrilineal ancestor. As such, they both belong to the same branch haplogroup J2b-M241>L283. J-L283 is a Paleo-Balkan lineage which has been found in samples throughout the region from coastal Dalmatia (Bronze Age) to eastern Dardania (Roman era) as well as in Iron Age Daunians (Italy). It represents 14-18% of Albanian lineages. The oldest J-L283 sample in northern Albania is found in MBA Shkrel as early as the 19th century BCE. In northern Albania, IA Çinamak (Kukës County), half of the men carried J-L283.

The Krasniqi and Nikaj lineages diverge after 1500 CE which is consistent with their origin story from the two brothers Kolë and Nikë Mekshi. The Margegaj belong to the Krasniqi lineage which confirms the oral tradition which considers them descendants of Kolë Mekshi. The Krasniqi and the Nikaj share the same progenitor with Gashi tribe ca. 1200 CE. Their connection indicates that their lineage was present in its present location (Tropojë) in the Middle Ages. The Krasniqi share no close patrilineal relation with all other fis which their traditions connect them with. This highlights that oral traditions do not necessarily reflect "real" kinship relations, but are complex social constructs which are influenced by many different factors.

== History ==
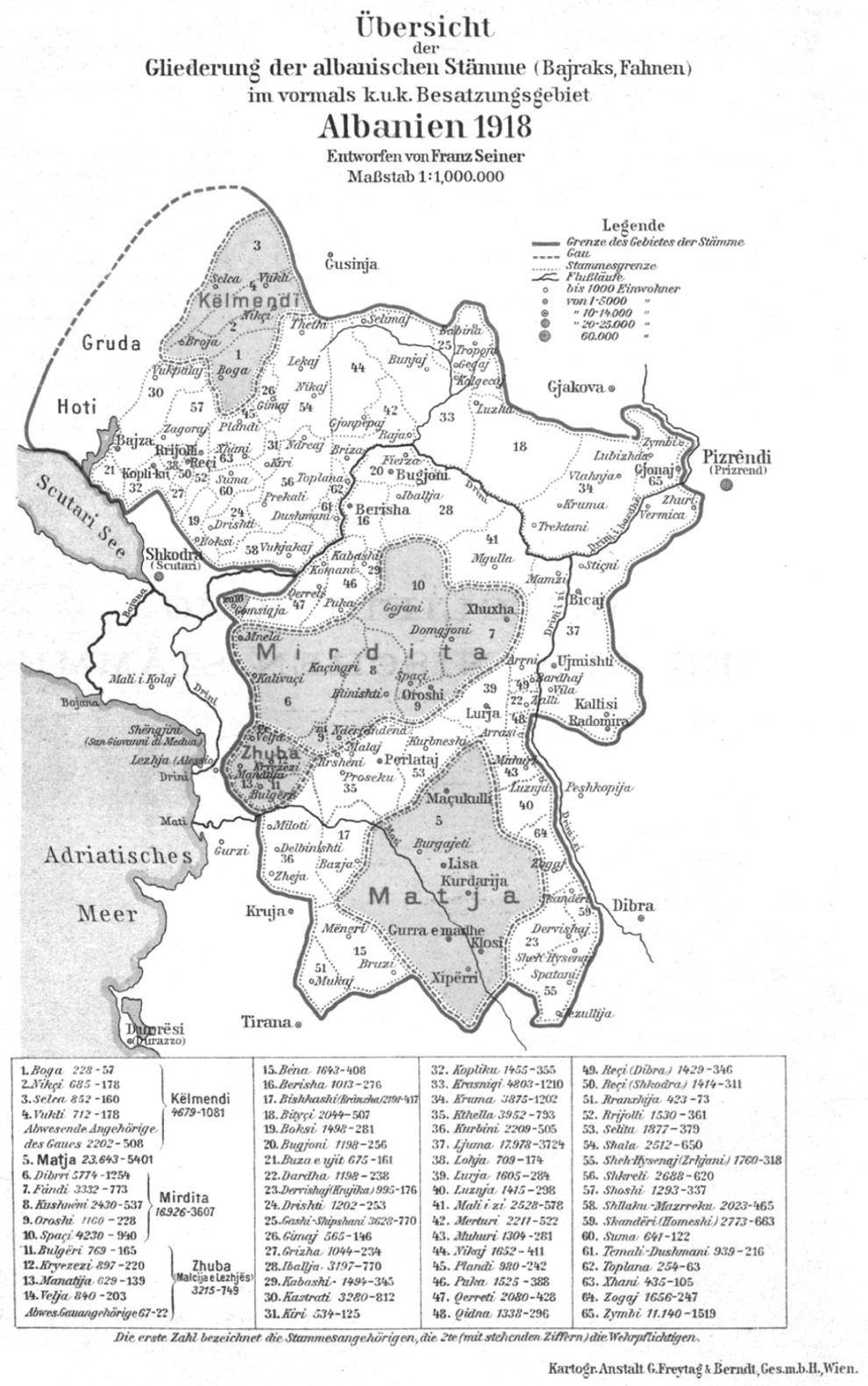
Albanian bayraks as of 1918. Krasniq covers section 33 of the map.

As for much of its history Krasniqi was a Catholic community, its early history is traced through official reports of Catholic clergy to the Vatican. In the 1628 report of Benedetto Orsini, they are mentioned for the first time as Crastignichieia. The tribe's name was recorded in 1634 as Crastenigeia in a report of the Catholic bishop Gjergj Bardhi and four years later, his nephew, bishop Frang Bardhi passed through Krasniqi territory and noted that they had their own church. These reports highlight that by the early 17th century, the Krasniqi community had been fully established. Daniele Farlati in "Illyricum sacrum VII" (1817), p.261, mentions it as Castranichius. The settlement of Krasniqi at that point had 60 households with 475 people. He also remarked the extreme poverty that the Krasniqi were enduring. In 1671, both Krasniqi and Nikaj are mentioned in the report of Shtjefën Gaspari. Between 1685 and 1690, historical records mention for the first time the newly formed Krasniqi villages of Kolgeci, Kolmekshi, and Bujup (present-day Margegaj), located further north of the main Krasniqi settlement. At the time, these villages collectively comprised 82 households and around 500 inhabitants. In 1690, the main Krasniqi village had 120 houses with over 1,000 inhabitants.

Heavy taxation against Catholics and Ottoman repression kickstarted the conversion of the population to Islam at the end of the 17th century. This process was mostly finished by the middle 19th century, but the Krasniqi community in and around the towns of Gjakova and also Prizren remained Catholic. From these Krasniqi families stem Catholic archbishop Matej Krasniqi and apostolic vicar Gaspër Krasniqi. The Catholics of Krasniqi were put under the Austrian kultursprotektorat in the late 1760s, which gave some religious freedom to Catholics in the Ottoman Empire under the state protection of the Austrian Empire. This allowed for the Catholic parishes of Gjakova and Prizren to rebuild their churches and schools.

== Traditional customs ==
The tribe's (historical) patron saint is St. George, whom they still revere after Islamization. The Krasniqi tribe is known to follow the Kanuni i Malësisë së Madhë, a variant of the Kanun, the Albanian traditional customary law.

== Notable people ==
- Bajram Curri, politician
- Shpend Dragobia, rebel
- Rexhep Krasniqi, Albanian MP, Minister of Education, and anti-communist
- Matej Krasniqi, Catholic Archbishop of Skopje
- Arben Vitia, is a Kosovar medical doctor and politician
- Gaspër Krasniqi, Catholic priest
- Binak Alia, from Mulosmanaj clan of Krasniqi, guerrilla fighter of the Albanian Revolt of 1845 and League of Prizren
- Mic Sokoli, was an Albanian guerrilla fighter from the Highlands of Gjakova.
- Haxhi Zeka, Member of the League of Prizren
- Behgjet Pacolli, is a Kosovar businessman and politician, who served as President of the Republic of Kosovo
- Dah Polloshka, was an Albanian warrior from Gjakova who fought Ottoman Tanzimat-reforms.
- Mark Krasniqi, Kosovar academic in ethnology and anthropology
- Luan Krasniqi, is a German former professional boxer.
- Robin Krasniqi, is a German professional boxer
- Shefqet Krasniqi Kosovar Muslim cleric
- Distria Krasniqi, is a Kosovan judoka and current Olympic champion in the extra-lightweight event
- Memli Krasniqi, Kosovo-Albanian politician
- Zana Krasniqi, Albanian model
- Vanessa Krasniqi, German-Albanian singer
- Olsi Krasniqi, Albanian professional rugby league footballer
- Jakup Krasniqi – Former Chairman of the Assembly of Kosovo
- Ejup Maqedonci - Minister of Defense of Kosovo

== See also ==
- List of Albanian tribes
- Krasniqi (surname)

== Sources ==
- Lauka, Alban; Muhaj, Ardian; Bojaxhi, Gjergj (2021). "Prejardhja e fiseve Krasniqe Nikaj nën dritën e të dhënave gjenetike, historike dhe traditës burimore [The origin of North Albanian tribes of Krasniqe and Nikaj based on Y-DNA phylogeny, historical data and oral tradition]" (PDF). Studime Historike. 3–4.
- Lazaridis, Iosif; Alpaslan-Roodenberg, Songül; et al. (26 August 2022). "The genetic history of the Southern Arc: A bridge between West Asia and Europe". Science. 377 (6609) eabm4247. doi:10.1126/science.abm4247. PMC 10064553. PMID 36007055.
