= Koshare =

Koshare may refer to:

- Koshare, Ferizaj, a village in Kosovo
- Koshare, Gjakova, a village in Kosovo
- Koshare, order of the Pueblo clown
- Koshare Indian Museum and Dancers
