= Bajram Curri (town) =

Town in Albania

- Administrative unit
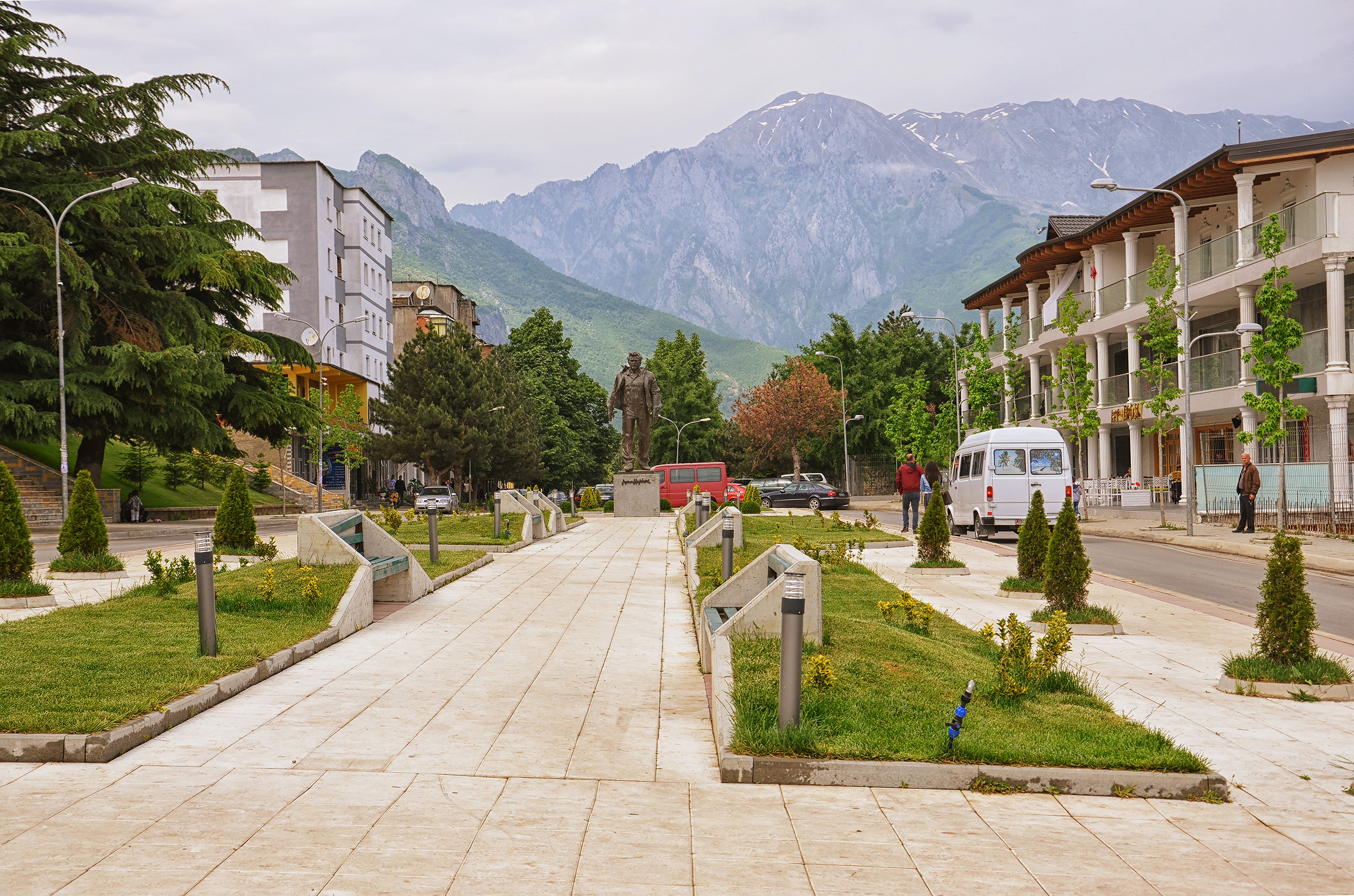
- Bajram Curri

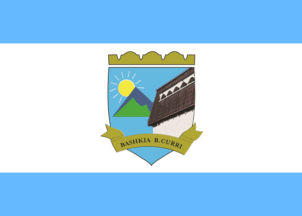
- Flag
- Interactive map of Bajram Curri
- Location within Albania Location within Balkans
- Coordinates: 42°21′30″N 20°04′34″E
- Country: Albania
- County: Kukës
- Municipality: Tropojë
- Named for: Bajram Curri

Population (2023)
  - Total: 4,113
- Time zone: UTC+1 (CET)
  - Summer (DST): UTC+2 (CEST)
- Postal code: 8701–8706
- Area code: +355 (0) 213
- Vehicle registration: BC

Bajram Curri (Albanian: [bajˈɾam t͡suri]), formerly known as Kolgecaj until 1952, is a town and administrative unit in the municipality of Tropojë, northeastern Albania, within the historical ethnographic region of the Gjakova Highlands. The town is located in a remote and mountainous region of the Albanian Alps, within the Valbonë Valley, and close to the border with Kosovo. It is named after Bajram Curri, a national hero who fought for ethnic Albanians, first against the Ottoman Empire and later against the Albanian government.

== History ==
Bajram Curri was founded in the year 1957 to serve as the center of the Tropoja district. The village was previously known as Kolgecaj. The newly formed city was built based on socialist principles. Historic Tropojë region was inhabited by the Berisha tribe and due to it geographic location had trading routes to the east (Kosovo vilayet) and to the west (Scutari vilayet) enabling the import of products from the Adriatic Sea region. One of the main trade goods was salt, which was exchanged for agricultural products. The center of Tropojë was an old city of Gjakova in the high mountains. The mountain pass "Tropojë e Vjetër" was used to relocate herds of cattle to graze in the green fields during summer and to return in autumn. People from all over the region went through this pass during the summer to enjoy fresh and cool air in high mountains. In modern times, these highlands also attract foreign tourists, especially from Europe and Israel.

== Geography ==
Bajram Curri is located down the valley of the river Valbonë. It is the main access point by road to the villages of Valbona and Rrogam. Water from the mountains flow into the waters of the Valbonë, the latter being famous for having the clearest river water in Albania. It is an administrative unit and the seat of the municipality of Tropojë.

=== Climate ===
Bajram Curri has a humid subtropical climate (Köppen climate classification: Cfa).

Seeing silent lightning is very common in the summer nights of Bajram Curri.

Climate data for Bajram Curri
Month	Jan	Feb	Mar	Apr	May	Jun	Jul	Aug	Sep	Oct	Nov	Dec	Year
Mean daily maximum °C (°F)	4.9 (40.8)	7.5 (45.5)	12.2 (54.0)	16.9 (62.4)	21.9 (71.4)	25.8 (78.4)	28.5 (83.3)	28.5 (83.3)	24.3 (75.7)	17.8 (64.0)	11.2 (52.2)	6.7 (44.1)	17.2 (62.9)
Daily mean °C (°F)	1.6 (34.9)	3.7 (38.7)	7.6 (45.7)	11.9 (53.4)	16.5 (61.7)	20.3 (68.5)	22.6 (72.7)	22.4 (72.3)	18.5 (65.3)	13.0 (55.4)	7.6 (45.7)	3.5 (38.3)	12.4 (54.4)
Mean daily minimum °C (°F)	−1.6 (29.1)	−0.1 (31.8)	3.1 (37.6)	6.9 (44.4)	11.1 (52.0)	14.8 (58.6)	16.7 (62.1)	16.4 (61.5)	12.8 (55.0)	8.3 (46.9)	4.1 (39.4)	0.3 (32.5)	7.7 (45.9)
Average precipitation mm (inches)	126 (5.0)	114 (4.5)	106 (4.2)	105 (4.1)	93 (3.7)	65 (2.6)	52 (2.0)	58 (2.3)	92 (3.6)	119 (4.7)	154 (6.1)	151 (5.9)	1,235 (48.7)

== Economy ==
The municipality of Tropojë has many agricultural products and is famous for its chestnuts, apples, nuts, grapes, and especially blueberries.

Large reserves of platinum, rhodium, ruthenium, palladium, iridium, and osmium have been discovered in Tropojë. Albanian, Italian, and Chinese engineers, working for Albanian Minerals and Bytyci Sh.p.k in Tropojë, suggest the area may have more than 500 million tons of chrome ore and more than two billion tons of olivine.

== Demography ==
As of the 2023 census, the administrative unit of Bajram Curri had an estimated population of 4,113 of whom 2,026 were men and 2,087 women.

== Notable people ==
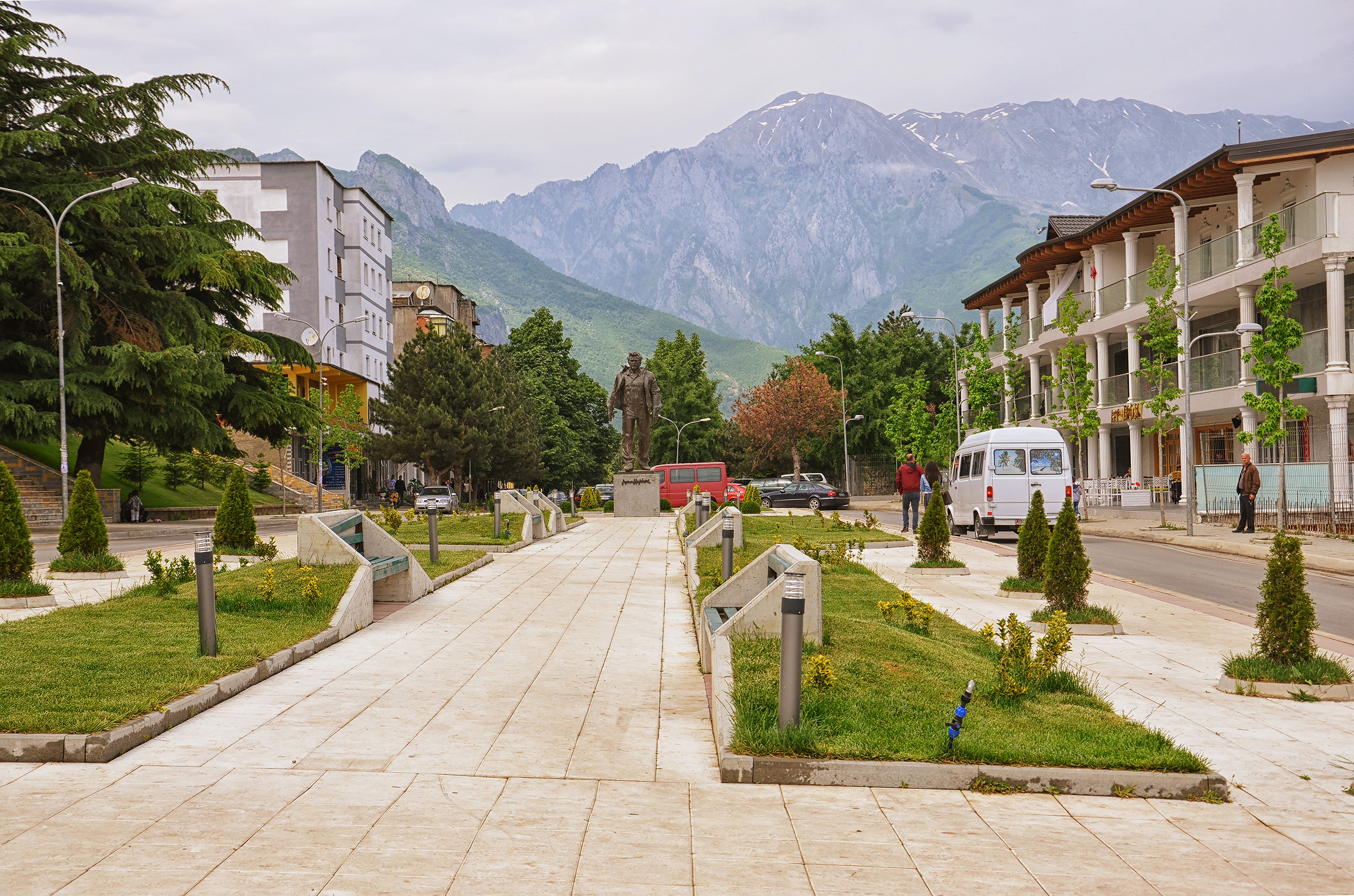
Azem Hajdari Square recently renovated in central Bajram Curri

- Sheh Ali Nimani – founded the first school in Tropoja in village called Tpla
- Sali Berisha – President of Albania from 1992 to 1997 and its Prime Minister from 2005 to 2013
- Zhaneta Byberi – Miss Universe Albania 2014
- Azem Hajdari – anti-Communist activist
- Besnik Mustafaj – 62nd Minister of Foreign Affairs of Albania
- Gerhard Progni – footballer
- Fatime Sokoli – folk singer
- Fatmira Breçani – folk singer
- Ibrahim Kadri Malaj – intellectual
- Tahir Sinani – commander of Kosovo Liberation Army (KLA)
- Bajram Mal Gjongecaj – intellectual, sports trainer, basketball coach
- Erxhan Osmani, basketball player

== See also ==
- Rosujë
