= Fatmira Breçani =

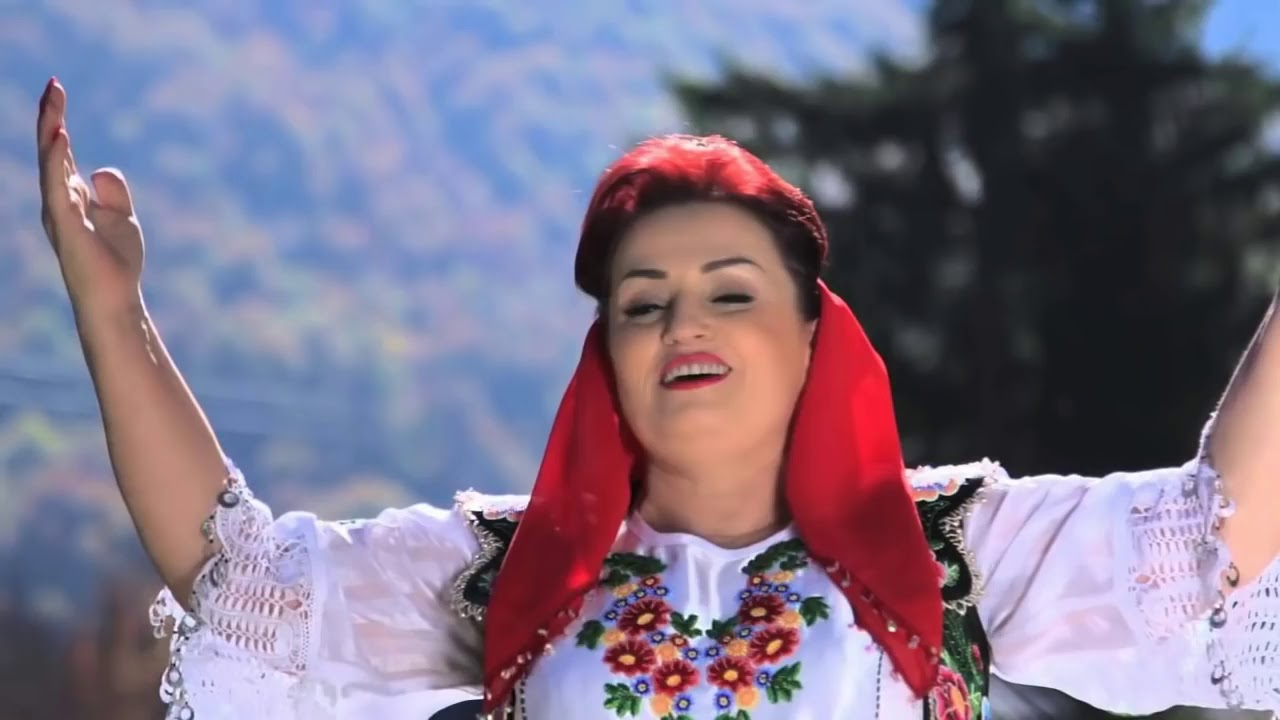
- Fatmira Brecani singing

Background information
- Born: Fatmira Breçani; May 8, 1960 (age 66); Markaj, Tropojë, Albania
- Genres: Albanian folk
- Occupation: Singer
- Years active: 1970s–present

Fatmira Breçani (born 8 May 1960) is an Albanian folk singer from Tropoja. She began performing in the 1970s . Over her career she has received a presidential decoration for her contributions to Albanian culture.

== Biography ==
=== Early life ===
Fatmira Breçani was born in the village of Markaj, Tropoja, northern Albania. She was raised in a family of twelve children. In the late 1970s she trained under veteran folk singer Fatime Sokoli.

=== Career ===
Breçani made her debut on the Albania folk stage in the mid‑1970s.

== Discography ==
=== Albums ===
- Hite (26 November 2024)
- Lujma, Lujma Doren
- Hajde Ne Bahçe
- Hidhe Vallen
- Oj Lulja e Blinit
- Dola n’ Penxhere
- N’ Dërrasë të Vëkit
- Potpuri
- Kërcimtaja
- Çikat Hedhin Vallë
- Lulja e Bjeshkës
- Dil Moj, Dil te Kroni
- Në Dasmën Tonë S’ndalet Gëzimitdrhzre

Tropojane Jam

- Jam e Bukur
- Tropojane
- Xinxilushe
- Hitet
- Tropojane Jamë
- Valle Tropojane

=== Singles ===
- "E vogla e nanës" (2013)
- "Me zemër të bardhë" (2021)
- "Gzimi i shpis" (2023)
- "Shqiptari" (2023)
- "Merri syt e mi" (2024)
- "Kolazh" (14 April 2025)
- "Kolazh Tropoje" (26 February 2025)
- "Kolazh 100 Vjet Muzikë" (26 February 2025)
- "E Bukura" (14 June 2025)
