= Tahir Sinani =

Albanian military commander (1964–2001)

- Born: 25 May 1964; Gri, near Bujan, Tropojë, Albania
- Died: 29 July 2001 (aged 37); Near Gostivar, Republic of Macedonia
- Cause of death: accidental explosion at an ammunition depot
- Burial place: Prizren, Kosovo
- Children: Rezart Sinani (Son); Rugova Sinani (Daughter); Another Daughter
- Relatives: Skënder Sinani (Brother); Mic Sokoli (great great grandfather); Sokol Rama (great great great grandfather); Binak Alia (Uncle of Mic Sokoli)
- Military career
- Allegiance: Albania; Kosova
- Branch: Kosovo Liberation Army; Kosovo Protection Corps; Liberation Army of Preševo, Medveđa and Bujanovac; National Liberation Army
- Service years: 1998–2001
- Rank: Commander
- Unit: 116 Brigade (NLA)
- Commands: Pashtrik Operational Zone (KLA); Third Operational Zone (KPC)
- Conflicts: Kosovo War: Battle of Paštrik; Insurgency in the Preševo Valley; 2001 insurgency in Macedonia ‽
- Awards: Hero of Kosovo

Tahir Sinani (25 May 1964 – 29 July 2001) was one of the commanders for the Kosovo Liberation Army (KLA) and National Liberation Army (NLA).

== Biography ==
Sinani was born in the village of Gri, near the town of Bujan within the Highlands of Gjakova, Albania, on 25 May 1964. During the Kosovo War, he was the commander of the Paštrik Operational Zone, which comprised areas near the cities of Prizren and Gjakova. Around this time, he took part in the Battle of Paštrik where he commanded the 122nd Brigade.

After the war, he was appointed the commander for the Third Operational Zone of the Kosovo Protection Corps, however he would also be involved in the insurgency in the Preševo Valley. During the 2001 insurgency in Macedonia, he was the commander of the 116th Brigade of the NLA.

On 16 July 2001, Sinani was added to the list of terrorists by the European Union and later on Macedonia's list of terrorists on 27 July 2001.

On 29 July 2001, along with four other fighters, an accidental explosion occurred which led to the deaths of all five including Sinani at an ammunition depot near Gostivar. On 24 May 2002, he was buried in the Martyrs' Cemetery in Landovica, Prizren.
