= Shkelqim =

Shkelqim or Shkëlqim is an Albanian masculine given name. Notable people with the name include:

- Shkëlqim Cani (born 1956), Albanian banker and politician
- Shkelqim Demhasaj (born 1996), Swiss and Kosovan footballer
- Shkelqim Krasniqi (born 1996), Swedish footballer
- Shkëlqim Muça (born 1960), Albanian footballer and coach
- Shkëlqim Troplini (1966–2020), Albanian wrestler
- Shkelqim Vladi (born 2000), Swiss and Kosovan footballer
