= Dah Polloshka =

Albanian warrior

Dah Polloshka or Abdullah Polloshka (1800–1845) was an Albanian warrior from Gjakova who fought Ottoman Tanzimat-reforms. He fell in the Albanian revolt of 1845 fighting the Ottomans in Nakarade, Gjakova. The Polloshka family, alongside the Vula family, were the founding families of Gjakova. Polloshka family derives from the Krasniqi and Geghyseni. Polloshka's house was burned twice by the Ottomans.

== Life ==
In March 1845, the insurgency against giving away the weapons continued in Gjakova, to which the Gjakova Highland tribes were joined led by Binak Alia and Sokol Rama. Around 8000 insurgents liberated Gjakova. But, the secretary of Rumelia, the perpetrator of Manastir Massacre, Reşid Mehmed Pasha, managed to crush the insurgency, massacring many insurgents. Dah Polloshka organized an assassination against Reshit pasha, and when he approached his tent he was noticed by pasha’s bodyguards and arrested, and with the order from serasker, his body was butchered. His mother hardly managed to get the permission from serasker to bury her son near the scene. A series of national songs dedicated to his heroism are still preserved.

He is mentioned in Albanian epic folklore.
