= Albanian revolt of 1845 =

Uprising in Ottoman Albania

- Part of the Albanian revolts against the Tanzimat
Date	May 1845 – 6 July 1845
Location	Ottoman Albania; Modern-day northern Albania, Kosovo (Yakova highlinds) and western North Macedonia (Reka region)
Result	Suppression of the revolt by the Ottomans

Belligerents
Ottoman Empire	Albanian rebels

Commanders and leaders
Ali Pasha of Gusinje; Bib Doda Pasha	Binak Alia; Sokol Rama

Strength
Unknown number of regular soldiers 3,000 irregulars from Malësia; Unknown number of irregulars from Plav-Gusinje and Mirdita	c. 8,000

The Albanian revolt of 1845, known Revolt of 1845 between Albanians was one of the 19th-century uprisings in Ottoman Albania directed against the Ottoman Tanzimat reforms.

== Background ==
The revolt came in continuity of a series of mistrust events between the Ottoman Empire and the Albanian population following the demise of Ali Pasha Tepelena, the Massacre of Monastir, 1830, and the suppression of the Pashalik of Shkodra. The Tanzimat reforms triggered a series of uprisings in Albanian Vilayets. After the revolts suppression, the Albanians lost their elite position within the Empire, established since the Köprülü family, and the seeds of the Albanian Nationalism were sown.

== Events ==
After the suppression of the Albanian Revolt of 1843-1844, the Ottoman troops were conscripted in Dibra and, with the exception of Shkodra, all districts were ordered to give up their arms. Winter then put an end of all further operations.

In mid-May 1845, the region of Gjakova rose again. Reşid Pasha had forbidden the population from bearing arms the year before, but the district refused to comply. The revolt started with around 2,000 people from Gjakovë area, and spread to the highlands. The highlanders (Krasniqi, Gashi, Bytyçi, and Tropoja) gathered under Krasniqi leaders Binak Alia (1805-1895) (Mulosmanaj clan) and Sokol Rama (1790-1860) (Gjonbalaj clan) both from Bujan. Sokol Rama is also referred as Sokol Arami or Sokol Aram. Other leaders were Haxhi Brahim Bajraktari, Sulejman Abaz Lushaj and Niman Uka Bajraktari. The uprising spread to the region of Reka (today's part of Mavrovo and Rostuša municipality in North Macedonia). The rebels comprised about 8,000 men. They drove the Ottoman garrison out of Gjakova.

Reşid Pasha, Wali of Rumelia, initially instructed to make use of irregular troops that the other districts of Albania had to provide, likewise in the previous revolts. These were about 3,000 men from Shkodra, primarily Catholic Malësia highlanders from the tribes of Hoti, Shkreli, Kastrati, Reçi, Lohja, Shala, Shoshi, and Postriba tribes, as well as men from Mirdita and Mat. In early June, imperial troops retook Gjakova and the irregular forces advanced on Reka and the mountains through Junik. The rebel sent most of the women and children to take refuge in the mountains near Bellaje (Deçan area). The revolt was initially successful, but when the irregular troops were reinforced by imperial forces with artillery, they were able to take the Morina Pass in Bytyçi area, and when the rebels were put to flight on 1 July, the troops marched into Gashi and Krasniqi.

In order to defeat the rebels completely, Reşid Pasha ordered further irregulars from Shkodra on the other side of the mountains to advance in order to block their escape route. This operation was carried out successfully by the Malissors of Shala and Shoshi, and by Ali Bey of Gucia from north with a contingent of men from Gucia, Plava, Vasojević, and Kuči. As a result, the revolt was suppressed on 6 July 1845.

Further, the Ottomans arrested a number of suspicious individuals in Yakova and fortified their position in front of local population. Bib Doda Pasha, Catholic Kapidan of Mirdita with his irregulars from Mirdita and Mat, and some from Tetovo went into the mountain valleys to conscript soldiers among the highlanders, therefore enforcing one of the Tanzimat requests. At the same time, many Albanians arrested during previous uprisings received amnesty and were released in an Ottoman attempt to calm down the situation.

== Aftermath ==
The success of the Turkish policy of centralization was, however, ephemeral. As long as Turkish troops were present in full force, some soldiers could be conscripted and some taxes collected by force. In Kosovo, the Tanzimat reforms could not be carried out until 1860.

== See also ==
- Albanian Revolt of 1847
- Dah Polloshka
