= Battle of Slivova =

1881 battle fought in Kosovo

Date	16–20 April 1881
Location	Slivova, modern day Kosovo
Result	Ottoman victory

Belligerents
League of Prizren	Ottoman Empire

Commanders and leaders
Mic Sokoli †; Isa Boletini; Sefë Kosharja †	Dervish Turgut Pasha

Strength
3,000–4,000	20 Battalions: 15,000

Casualties and losses
800	1,800

The Battle of Slivova was fought between the Albanian League of Prizren and the Ottoman Empire in the vicinities of the villages of Slivova and Koshare near modern-day Ferizaj, Kosovo, between 16 and 20 April 1881.

== Background ==
After the Russo-Turkish War of 1877–78, Albanians under the Ottoman Empire feared that their lands would be partitioned amongst Montenegro, Serbia, Bulgaria, and Greece, which fueled further Albanian resistance against Ottoman rule. On the 10th of June, 1878, the League of Prizren - an Albanian political organisation - was created by a group of Albanian intellectuals and community leaders to resist partition among neighbouring Balkan states and to assert an Albanian national consciousness by uniting Albanians into a unitary linguistic and cultural nation. The group of representatives that had eventually come to control the League under Abdyl Frashëri's leadership focused on working towards Albanian autonomy and establishing an Albanian state by strengthening the sense of an Albanian identity that would cut across religious and tribal lines.

Failing to win their claims on a diplomatic level, Albanians embarked on the route of military conflict with their Balkan neighbours to realise their goals. The League consisted of 30,000 armed members and launched a revolution against the Ottoman Empire after the debacle at the Congress of Berlin. The Ottomans had ordered the official dissolution of the League out of the fear that they would seek total independence from the empire. Increasing international pressure to "pacify" the Albanians caused the Ottoman sultan to dispatch a great army under Dervish Turgut Pasha, whose objective was to suppress the League and to ultimately hand Ulqin over to Montenegro

== Battle ==
The battle was fought in 1881 near the village of Slivova in Kosovo. Dervish Pasha, who had come with the aim of breaking the Albanian League of Prizren and the Albanian insurgent forces in Kosovo, Dukagjini and the Gjakova Highlands, led by Sylejman Vokshi, commander of the League's Forces, who had taken up positions in front of Ferizaj, in the villages of Slivovo and Koshare. Isa Boletini also participated in this battle.

On April 16, the Ottoman forces attacked in the direction of Slivova, but the Albanian forces withstood the attack and for 4 days and nights nailed them in front of the hills. A chronicler writes: "Their ambush and pressure (on the Albanians) became so sudden that, at the first moment, the Ottoman army was forced to withdraw. The attack on Albanians was repeated several times."

On April 20, at 6.00, Dervish Pasha attacked on a large scale, targeting Slivova, Shtime, Carraleva Gorge, and then Prizren. About 15,000 Ottoman soldiers attacked in three directions. Although with little ammunition, thanks to their resilience, the Albanians stopped the advance of the enemy for many hours. But their situation worsened when Ottoman field artillery entered action. Dervish Pasha ordered 6 cannons to be brought immediately to the hill near Slivova, which opened fire for more than an hour and a half. He did not hesitate to fire cannon even at the soldiers of one of his battalions (with Albanian nizams) who hesitated to attack, killing 50 of them.

When he saw that the path of the League's men was being bombed, through which they attacked Dervish Pasha's camp, Mic Sokoli performed a rare act of bravery: when he realised that he could not kill the men who operated the cannon alone, he put his chest on the cannon where he got a lot of wounds. The Ottomans got terrified when Mic Sokoli had started to push the cannon downhill, thrusting his chest into the cannon then they fired the ball from fear, where Mic Sokoli fell and died.
