= Bujan Conference =

Political Assembly Held December 1943-January 1944

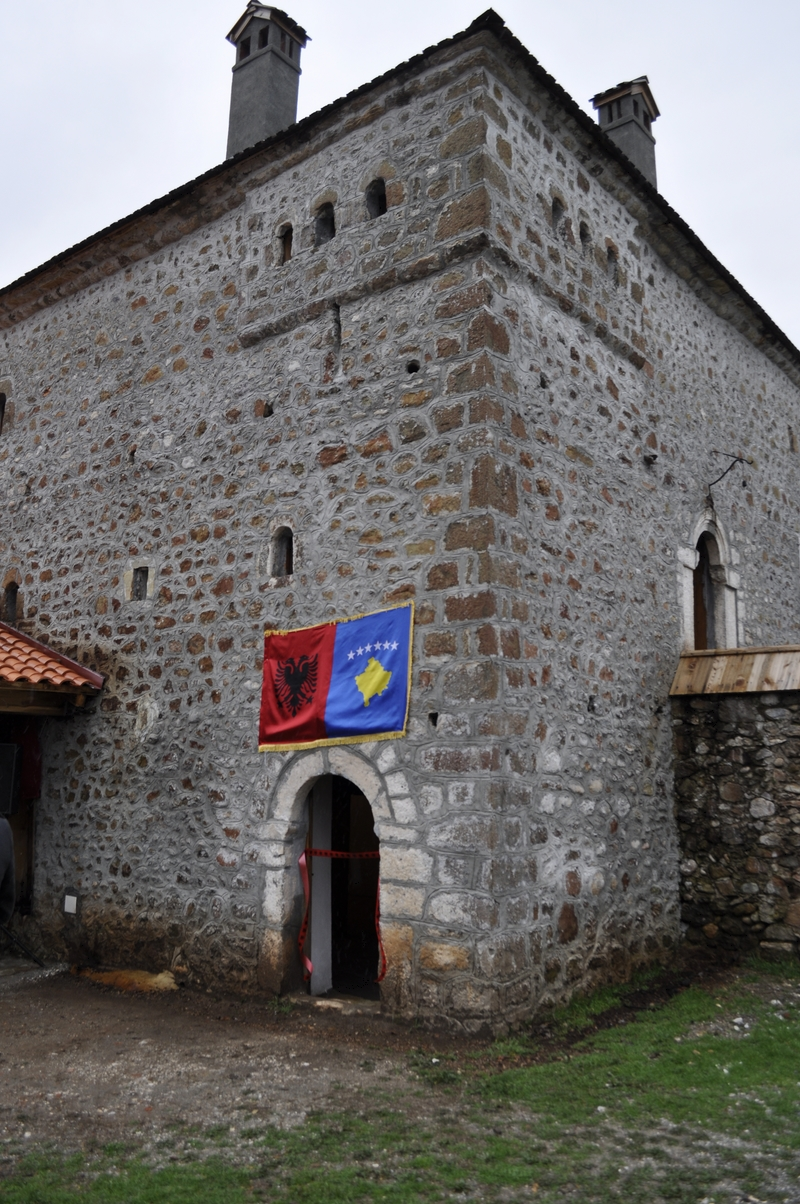
The Kulla where the Conference of Bujan was held in Bujan, Albania.

The Bujan Conference was a political assembly held between December 31st, 1943 and January 2nd, 1944 in Bujan, a village in the Highlands of Gjakova. It was attended by 49 delegates from the Communist Party of Albania and the Communist Party of Yugoslavia. The organization of the conference was fueled by the main political goal among Kosovo Albanians in that era which was self-determination and reunification of Kosovo with Albania. The main resolution voted in Bujan called for the unification of the Socialist Republic of Albania and Kosovo after the end of WWII. The resolution of Bujan was abandoned after German retreat from the Balkans. Kosovo remained part of Yugoslavia, as an autonomous region of SR Serbia. The first uprising against the new Yugoslav regime began in late 1944, a few weeks after Yugoslav leadership made it clear that the unification of Kosovo with Albania would not occur after the war.

== Background ==
The Bujan Conference took place towards the end of World War II, in which many ethnically Albanian lands were under Fascist occupation. Kosovo was also under the control of the Fascists, and although there was not much enthusiasm for Fascist administration, Kosovo Albanians preferred it to oppressive Serbian rule. Tito and the communists originally promised to let the people of Kosovo decide democratically whether they wished to be part of Albania or Yugoslavia, which led to the conference.

The decision to organise the Conference was held during the VIth Council of the Party's Provincial Committee for Kosovo and Dukagjin (Sharri, 3-5 November 1943). Initially, the Conference was to be held in Drenica, but the military and political circumstances at the time were unfavourable. Other important decisions were made at this meeting, such as:

1. To form the Provincial National Liberation Council for Kosovo and the Dukagjin Plateau.
2. Establish the Chief of Staff of the National Liberation Army and the Partisan troops for Kosovo and the Dukagjin Plateau.
3. Change the name "Metohija" to "Dukagjin Plateau ".

The Bujan Conference was opened on 31 December 1943 at 19.00 by Xhevdet Doda, delegate of the Kosovar-Macedonian Brigade. He proposed a 7-member presidency as well as two record-keeping holders, and then the 3-member Mandate Verification Council was elected. The conference took place within the Kulla of Sali Mani, a Bajraktar of the Krasniqi tribe of the Gjakova Highlands. 49 delegates participated in the conference. It was welcomed by Fadil Hoxha - commander of the Chief of Staff of the National Liberation Army for Kosovo and Dukagjin Plateau, P.Jovicevic - on behalf of the Communist Party of Yugoslavia Regional Committee for Kosovo and Dukagjin Plateau, Xhafer Vokshi - on behalf of the Anti-fascist Youth, Sabrije Vokshi - on behalf of the Anti-fascist Women's Front, Xhevdet Doda - on behalf of the Kosovar-Macedonian Brigade and Mehmet Bajraktari - on behalf of Krasniqi National Liberation Council.

== Resolution ==
The Bujan Conference would culminate with an ultimate resolution - Kosovo would be reunified with Albania. The following is an excerpt from the Conference:

Kosovo and the Dukagjin Plateau [Metohia] is a region inhabited by an Albanian majority which has always wanted to be united with Albania, as it does today. We therefore feel it is our duty to show the right way that the Albanian people must take to realise its aspirations. The only way for the Albanian people of Kosovo and the Dukagjin Plateau to be united with Albania is the common war with the other peoples of Yugoslavia against the blood-thirsty Nazi occupiers and their mercenaries. This is the only way to gain freedom – a freedom in which all the peoples, including the Albanian people, will be able to decide on their own fate with the right to self-determination, and even secession. The guarantors of this are the National Liberation Army of Yugoslavia and the National Liberation Army of Albania with which the former is closely linked. Aside from them, this will be guaranteed by our great allies: The Soviet Union, England and America (The Atlantic Charter, the Conference of Moscow and the Conference of Tehran).

Executive: Mehmet Hoxha, Pavle Jovićević, Rifat Berisha, Xhevdet Doda, Fadil Hoxha, Hajdar Dushi, Zekeria Rexha.

Members of the Council:

Ismail Gjinali, Tefik Çanga, Qamil Luzha, Xheladin Hana, Halil Haxhija, Ismet Shaqiri, Adem Miftari, Ismail Isufi, Sabrije Vokshi, Veliša Mičković, Lubomir Canić, Abdyl Kerim Ibrahim, Spira Velković, Xhevat Tahiri, Ymer Pula, Et-hem Zurnaxhiu, Ing. Nexhat Basha, Ajdin Bajraktari, Bejto Šahmanović, Milan A. Mičković, Zymer Halili, Mehmet Dermani, Qamil Brovina, Gani S. Çavdarbasha, Sul B. Alaj, Shaban Kajtazi, Ferid Perolli, Haxhi Morina, Xhavid Sh. Nimani, Reshat Isa, Mehmet Bajraktari, Veli Niman Doçi, Rasim Cokli, Sadik Bekteshi, Jaho Bajraktari, Shaban Haxhija, Alush Gashi, Beqir Ndou, Xhafer Vokshi, Sima H. Vasilević, Enver Dajçi, Maxhun Doçi Nimani.

== Aftermath ==
The conference reflected the politics of Albanian Communists for self-determination and the attempts of Yugoslav Communists to strike a balance between Albanian and Serbian Communists. Tito's first response to the conference was cautious and he called for postponement of a final decision. In an effort to gain popularity in Serbia, the Yugoslav Communists abandoned the resolution of the conference altogether. An uprising against the Yugoslavs in Kosovo followed. In 1945, Kosovo was designated an autonomous region of Yugoslavia within the borders of the Socialist Republic of Serbia.

== Bibliography ==
=== Sources ===
- Meier, Viktor (2005). Yugoslavia: A History of its Demise. Routledge. ISBN 1134665105.
