= Hysni =

- Gender: Male

Origin
- Region of origin: Albania, Kosovo

Hysni is an Albanian masculine given name and may refer to:

- Hysni Curri (died 1925), Kosovar-Albanian military figure and revolutionary
- Hysni Kapo (1915–1979), Albanian military commander and politician
- Hysni Krasniqi (born 1942), Albanian painter and graphic artist
- Hysni Milloshi (1946–2012), Albanian politician and communist activist
