= Slivovo, Ferizaj =

Village in Kosovo

Slivovo
- Village
- Location within Kosovo Location within Europe
- Coordinates: 42°28′2″N 21°5′28″E
- Country: Kosovo
- District: Ferizaj
- Municipality: Ferizaj

Population (2024)
  - Total: 1,339
- Time zone: UTC+1 (CET)
  - Summer (DST): UTC+2 (CEST)

Slivovo is a village in Ferizaj Municipality, Kosovo. According to the Kosovo Agency of Statistics (KAS) from the 2024 census, there were 1,339 people residing in Slivovo, with Albanians constituting the majority of the population.

== History ==
Slivovo was the site of the 1881 Battle of Slivova between Albanian forces of the League of Prizren and the Ottoman Empire.
