= Sefë Kosharja =

Albanian resistance figure

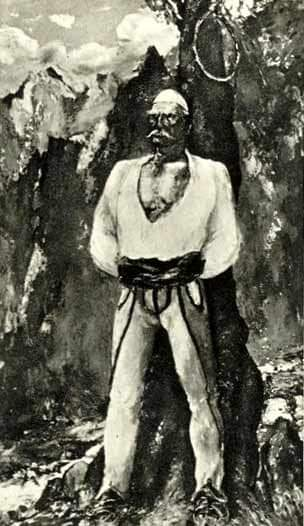
- Born: c. 1825; Koshare, Ottoman Empire, (modern Kosovo)
- Died: 1881; Ottoman Empire, (modern Kosovo)
- Other name: Sefë Qorri
- Occupation: Military
- Years active: 1860-1881
- Known for: Siege of Plevna; Participation in the League of Prizren; Battle of Slivova

Sefë Mahmut Kosharja, also known as Sefë Qorri, was an Albanian resistance fighter and leader during the Albanian National Awakening, serving as a prominent member of the League of Prizren.

== Early life and Ottoman Army ==
Born Sefë Mahmuti sometime around 1825 in the village of Koshare near Ferizaj, Kosharja was recruited into the ranks of the Ottoman army at around 1855, serving for a total of 5 years. As a result of his military merits during his service, he was assigned to a unit of military reserves. He then served another 2 years in Istanbul. Around 1867, he returned to his homeland, married and began a family.

Together with other Albanians that were called to serve in Istanbul for Osman Pasha in 1876, he was stationed in Bulgaria, specifically Plevne, the site of a fierce battle. He led a group of men granted to him by Osman Pasha. During the intense fighting against the Russians, Bulgarians, Moldovans, and Romanians at the battle of Plevna, Sefë was injured and lost one eye. After that he was nicknamed Sefë Qorri meaning "Sefë the blind". After the fighting, he was granted passage home to Koshare, close to Ferizaj. As a veteran of war, he enjoyed the respect of Osman Pasha who had admired Sefë's courage.

Sefë Kosharja was also said to have participated in the extermination of Greek bands that had massacred Muslim Albanian civilians; he is also said to have killed a Greek commander during one of these skirmishes, and thereafter taking the commander's sword as his own weapon. It is possible that he had lost his eye during his battles with the Greeks.

== League of Prizren ==
Sefë Kosharja was one of the most notable figures of the League of Prizren, an Albanian political organisation that sought to create an independent Albania, free from the Ottomans, South Slavs, and the Greeks. He was also close with Mic Sokoli, and is believed to have freed him from the prison of Peja before the Ottoman soldiers could send him to Istanbul. He was a leading figure in the Battle of Slivova.

While serving in the Ottoman army, he was an artilleryman; he had managed to seize Turkish cannons and placed them in front of the hill of the village of Koshare. Along with several other artillerymen, Sefë built two catapults that hit Dervish Pasha's army from behind, enabling fighters like Mic Sokoli to attack the positions of the Ottoman cannons. After Mic Sokoli sacrificed himself by pressing his body towards a Turkish cannon, Sefë Qorri was seriously wounded in the leg and in one hand. He was captured alive by the Ottoman Turks and a military trial led by Dervish Pasha quickly sentenced him to death; he was hung on a tree. The Ottomans warned Sefë's family that there would be consequences if they tried to take his body down before 7 days had passed. During the night, three days past his hanging, his nephews - Asllan and Shaban Emini from the neighbourhood of Hysiqi in Shtime - removed his body from the rope and buried their uncle in a secret location. Afterwards, they contacted their other uncles and showed them where they had buried him. He was given the title of Sefë Kosova for his bravery during his lifetime.

== Hero ==
Sefe Qorri is remembered today as an Albanian National Hero.
