= Bilall Syla =

- Born: March 14, 1965 (age 61); Medveđa, SFR Yugoslavia
- Military career
- Allegiance: Kosova
- Branch: Kosovo Liberation Army
- Rank: Commander
- Conflicts: Kosovo War: Battle of Paštrik

Bilall Syla (born March 14, 1965), is a former commander of Brigade 121 of the Kosovo Liberation Army (KLA; Albanian: Ushtria Çlirimtare e Kosovës—UÇK), including during the Kosovo War. The KLA was an ethnic-Albanian paramilitary organisation that fought for the secession of Kosovo from the Federal Republic of Yugoslavia (FRY) during the 1990s and the eventual creation of a Greater Albania.

== Early life ==
In 1973, his family moved to Pristina, and Bilallicompleted primary school there. Although he had interest in the military art, in the years 1980-1988 he completed high school and military academy in Belgrade.

From 1988 to 1991 he served in Vërnik, Slovenia in the tank brigade, while after the outbreak of the conflict in Slovenia, on August 16, 1991 he deserted from APJ to return to Kosovo. From the fall of 1991 to 1993, as a soldier, he participated in the military training of young people for war. In September 1993, he was arrested by the Serbian UDB and after ten months he was "released" from prison, but not from the accusation. In order not to fall into the hands of the UDBA again, Bilall Syla left Kosovo and immigrated to Germany. While there he came into contact with activists of the People's Movement of Kosovo and first engaged in the collection of financial resources for the Kosovo Liberation Army.

== The War ==
In March 1999, he physically joined the ranks of the KLA. He actively participated in the training of young volunteers who came from the diaspora, while in May–June 1999, as a brigade commander, he was involved in the prepared Battle of Paštrik from the SHP of the KLA.
