= Battle of Paštrik =

1999 military operation during the Kosovo War

- Part of the Kosovo War
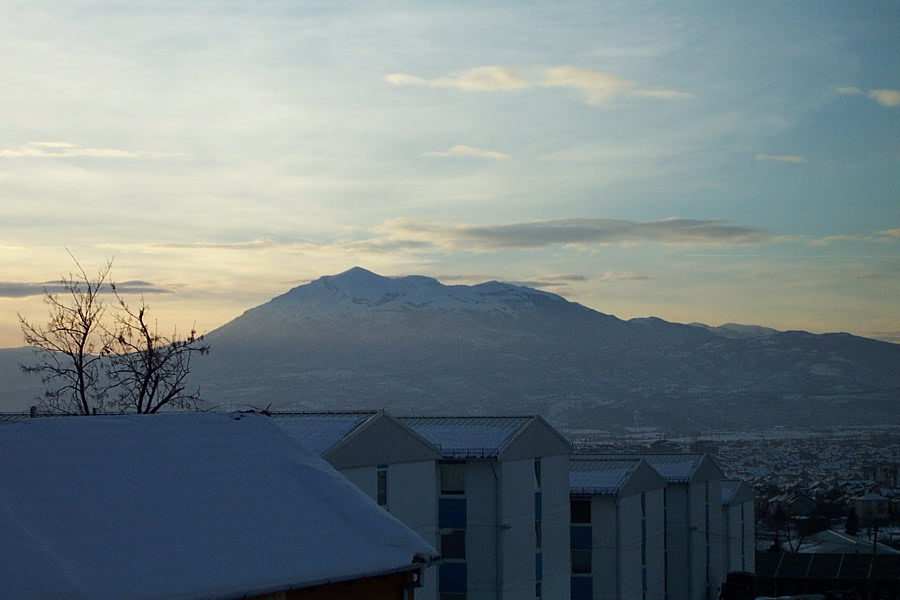
- Mount Paštrik view from Prizren
Date	26 May – 10 June 1999
Location	Paštrik, AP Kosovo, FR Yugoslavia (FR Yugoslav-Albanian border) 42°12′38″N 20°31′24″E
Result	Yugoslav victory; KLA–NATO failure; Kumanovo Agreement; End of the Kosovo War

Belligerents
Kosovo Liberation Army (NATO) NATO; Artillery support: Albania; Medical support: Norway	(Federal Republic of Yugoslavia) Yugoslav Army

Commanders and leaders
Agim Çeku; Bilall Syla; Ekrem Rexha; Sadik Halitjaha; Tahir Sinani; Beqir Sadiku (Albania) Kudusi Lama (NATO) Wesley Clark	(Federal Republic of Yugoslavia) Nebojša Pavković (Federal Republic of Yugoslavia) Vladimir Lazarević (Federal Republic of Yugoslavia) Božidar Delić (Federal Republic of Yugoslavia) Stojan Konjikovac

Units involved
Pashtrik Operational Zone; 121st Brigade “Ismet Jashari”; 122nd Brigade “Myrtë Zeneli”; 123rd Brigade “Suhareka”; 124th Brigade “Gani Paçarizi”; 125th Brigade “Pashtriku”; Atlantic Battalion; Task Forces 0-6; Kukës Division	(Federal Republic of Yugoslavia) Priština Corps Units 549th Motorized Brigade; 72nd special Airborne Brigade; Russian volunteers

Strength
2,000–4,000 (United States) B-52, A-10 and Lockheed AC-130 units Artillery support	(Federal Republic of Yugoslavia) Three infantry battalions, one artillery battalion, one armored battalion, and air defense companies (reinforcements added during the battle

Casualties and losses
15 killed and 40 wounded	(Federal Republic of Yugoslavia) 25 killed and 126 wounded Per NATO: 32 artillery pieces, 9 armored personnel carriers, 6 armored vehicles, 4 other military vehicles, 8 mortar positions and one SA6 surface to air missile
- Location of Pashtrik in Kosovo

The Battle of Paštrik (Serbian Cyrillic: Битка на Паштрику, romanized: Bitka na Paštriku, Albanian: Beteja e Pashtrikut) was a two-week confrontation between the KLA with NATO's support against the Federal Republic of Yugoslavia in 1999, during the Kosovo War. The official goal of the KLA was to seize the border between Albania and Kosovo, and eliminate the Yugoslav units there. The offensive was codenamed Operation Arrow (Albanian: Operacioni Shigjeta) by the KLA.

KLA fighters managed to seize Mount Pashtrik, its northern slopes and the village of Milaj, on the northern bank of the White Drin by the end of May. In spite of heavy NATO air support, which included the use of USAF B-52 bombers, the Yugoslav Army held the line on the White Drin, where they built temporary bridges to maintain their supply lines open, supported by heavy mortars and artillery. The KLA took over the villages of Planeja, Bucare and Ljumbarda and a stretch of the border area northwest of Prizren, but was unable to make further gains by the time of the Kumanovo Agreement on 9 June, which resulted in Yugoslav troops withdrawing from Kosovo.

== Background ==
In April 1999 a month prior to the battle, Albanian refugees from the villages of Gorozhup, Milaj, Gjonaj and Planeja at the slopes of Mount Pashtrik reported that they had been beaten, killed and forcefully driven out of their villages by Yugoslav army, police and paramilitaries. The terrain between Kosovo and Albania which is mountainous only allows a few passages, the Yugoslav army sought to create defensive chain which they believed would repel a ground attack by the KLA. The Pashtrik area was particularly vulnerable if attacked by light infantry; the Yugoslav army was aware of this and established a series of watchtowers and observation posts at strategic points near the Albanian border.

The KLA had received training and arms from the Albanian army and western agencies, during this period the KLA also focused on recruiting ethnic Albanian veterans from the wars in Croatia and Bosnia. Agim Çeku, the most prominent commander during the battle, was an officer in the Croatian army during Operation Medak Pocket and Operation Storm. The KLA high command was vague in their statements about the operation. Their official goal was to capture Mount Pashtrik and the forward operation bases there. Western media reported that the KLA's goal was the capture the highway linking Peja and Prizren several kilometers north of Pashtrik and some even more ambitious reports placed the capture of Prizren as a goal. These scenarios and media reports have been assessed as unrealistic as the KLA could have captured Prizren only under prolonged ground attacks and air strikes. The political goals of the KLA were not to secure a military victory but to put the 549th under fire and send a message that this was a prelude to a much larger NATO ground invasion. The KLA's force was reported to be as high as 4000 men by some western sources. Albanian TV only stated the units involved being the 121st 'Ismet Jashari' Brigade and the 123rd Brigade, both were a part of the Operational Zone Pashtrik. Wesley Clark put the number of KLA insurgents at between 1800-2000. The KLA was supported by tank and artillery fire from the Albanian army and close air support from NATO.

== Battle ==
=== 26–29 May: Initial KLA attack ===
The offensive began at 4 am, when KLA troops attacked across a ten mile front from their operating areas, supported by barrages from the Albanian army and NATO air support. They quickly overran Yugoslav observation points and watchtowers. Once past the border, some units appear to have gone to the northern side of the mountain from which they could observe armored units in Gjakova. Other units went over the mountain or to the forests south of it. When Colonel Delić realized an offensive was underway, he ordered his troops to entrench and responded to the attack with howitzer and mortars. He ordered his artillery to target the avenues leading to the mountain. These barrages compromised the KLA's offensive capabilities for the next two days. Despite extensive use of NATO air strikes, they did little to stop Yugoslav artillery from attacking KLA supply lines within Albania. As combat continued in the border settlements, KLA sources reported that they had overrun Planeja and were moving towards Gjonaj.

=== 1 June: Increased NATO air strikes ===
On 1 June, NATO aircraft launched around 150 sorties on VJ targets. NATO claimed to have hit 32 artillery pieces, 9 personnel carriers, 6 armored vehicles, 4 other military vehicles, 8 mortar positions and one SA6 surface to air missile. NATO throughout the campaign kept the KLA at an arms length. The KLA offensive had reached a stalemate, and the Yugoslav army appeared to be organizing a counter offensive. NATO fearing Milošević would get a better position at the negotiating table if they recaptured the gains made by the KLA stepped up their bombing campaign. According to Dana Priest, Wesley Clark told his officers, "That mountain is not going to get lost. I'm not going to have Serbs on that mountain. We'll pay for that hill with American blood if we don't help [the KLA] hold it." Some NATO air strikes hit KLA positions, however the KLA did not suffer any casualties from NATO friendly fire at that time. These air strikes gave the KLA opportunities to attack. The Yugoslav army responded to this by shelling settlements at the border with Albania including the settlements of Pergolaj, Golaj and Krumë. These strikes didn't hit any civilian targets, but increased the refugee flows in Kukës and put pressure on the administration. Albania responded to this by mobilizing its army to the border and conducting a high profile live fire exercise.

=== 6–9 June: Stalemate ===
On 6 June, the Yugoslav Army launched a counter offensive near Planeja. As the Yugoslav soldiers advanced towards Planeja, they were hit by 82 unguided Mark 82 bombs from two B-52s and a B-1B. There are conflicting accounts about the casualties suffered by the Yugoslav troops. The Washington Post Foreign Service, which also claim that the strike involved the use of cluster munition, put the toll in "several hundreds". According to some testimonies from KLA fighters, they suffered serious casualties but according to other KLA reports most were able to get into safety before the impact. A ground inspection by German KFOR troops following the end of hostilities found no wreckages of any vehicles or tanks. On June 7, bombing and ground fighting continued around Pashtrik. On June 9, the Yugoslav army retreated and the Military Technical Agreement was signed for the withdrawal of all Yugoslav forces from Kosovo.

== Aftermath and result ==
Despite the KLA managing to capture Pastrik, the operation was still regarded as a failure, since NATO and the KLA failed to reach their main objective and suffered heavy defeat. Some sources even reported that the KLA was “creamed” during the battle. According to Milovan Drecun, he described the battle as factor that would decide who would at least in military terms win the war. There have also been claims that the battle was a key factor in Milošević’s decision to sign the Kumanovo Agreement.

== Bibliography ==
- Forage, Paul C. (1 December 2001). "The battle for mount Pastrik: A preliminary study". The Journal of Slavic Military Studies. 14 (4): 57–80. doi:10.1080/13518040108430498. ISSN 1351-8046. S2CID 143238207.
- Smiljanić, Spasoje (2009). Agresija NATO: ratno vazduhoplovstvo i protivvazdušna odbrana u odbrani otadžbine [NATO Aggression: Air Force and Air Defense in Defense of the Fatherland] (in Serbian) (second ed.). Belgrade: Club of Generals and Admirals in Serbia. ISBN 978-86-912285-0-7.
