= Mic Sokoli =

Albanian freedom fighter

- Born: 1839; Fang, Bujan, Tropojë, Scutari vilayet, Ottoman Empire (modern Albanian)
- Died: 20 April 1881 (aged 41–42); Battle of Slivova
- Known for: Thrusting his body in front of an enemy cannon and raising morale
- Parent: Sokol Rama (Father)
- Awards: Hero of the People

Mic Sokoli (1839 – 20 April 1881) was an Albanian guerrilla fighter from the Highlands of Gjakova. He fought in the Battle of Nokshiq (near Plav) against the Montenegrins, and was a notable fighter of the League of Prizren, having fought in Gjakova against Mehmet Ali Pasha. He is remembered by Albanians for an act of heroism in April 1881, in which he sacrificed himself by pressing his body against the mouth of an Ottoman cannon.

== Early life ==
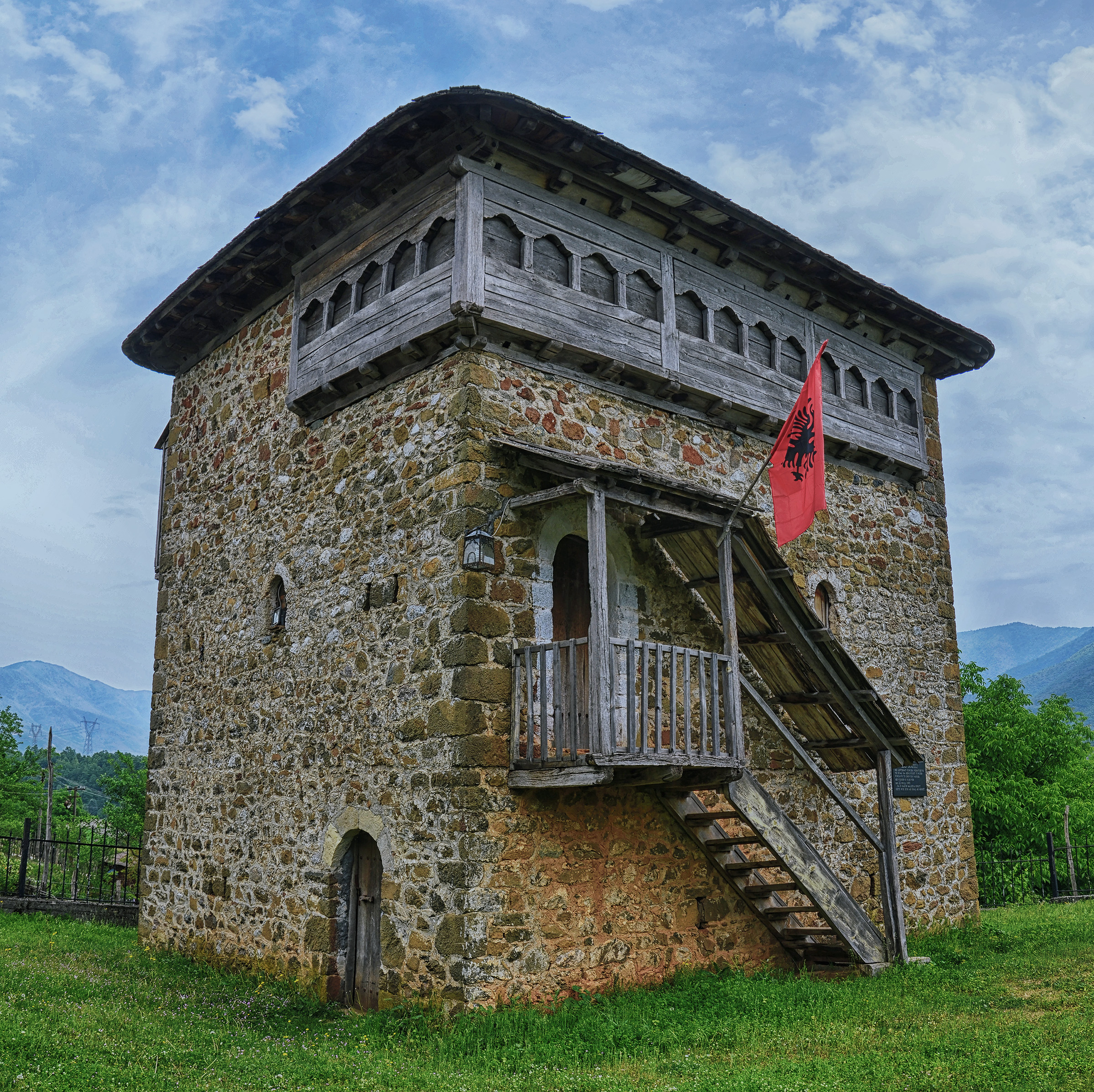
The Sokoli Kulla (Tower House) in Bujan, Tropojë, Albania

Mic Sokoli was born in the village of Fang near Bujan in the Highlands of Gjakova in 1839 to a patriotic family of the Krasniqi tribe. His father, Sokol Rama, and his uncle, Binak Alia, were notable leaders in the Albanian uprisings against the Tanzimat reforms, similar to the leadership role Mic Sokoli would eventually hold with the League of Prizren.

== Activities ==
Mic Sokoli participated in his first battle when he was 16 against the Montenegrins. Mic would lead his fellow fighters out of their encircled position in a battle that the Albanians would eventually win. Sokoli was a veteran of warfare, having participated in many battles during his lifetime; he played an active role in the battles of Üsküb, Ferizaj, Gjilan and Gjakova against Mehmed Ali Pasha, was distinguished during the Battle of Novšiće against the Montenegrins, fought in Plav, Guci, Hoti, Gruda and Tuzi, and ultimately in the battles of Shtimë, Carralevë and Slivovë.

Mic Sokoli had operated in Prizren under the protection of Ymer Prizreni, but after killing a local rich Turk, he moved to Peja and lived with Haxhi Zeka. Mic would continue to carry out other assassinations of Ottoman officials and soldiers. At the age of 18, he was forced to flee to the mountains where he was taken in by Sulejman Vokshi. There he learned about warfare and mountain life, and he distinguished himself as a strong warrior and a capable leader in many battles. He played a major role in the League of Prizren, where he led large military units and was known for capturing spies. Mic Sokoli was the commander of a force of 3,000 malësors. After taking part in the battle in Gjakova against Mehmed Ali Pasha, Sokoli went to the northern parts of the Kosovo Vilayet region (Yeni Pazar etc.) to fight against the Serbians. He would then go and fight in Malësia e Madhe. During the capture of Pristina from the Ottomans, Sokoli led his 3,000 Malësors on a surprise attack against the Ottoman forces from the mountains of Germia. He was wounded during the battle of Üsküb.

== Death ==
At the Battle of Slivove in April 1881, Mic Sokoli noticed that the League's fighters were being bombarded from a strong position. Upon realising that it would be impossible to kill the Ottoman soldiers operating the cannons, Sokoli would press his chest against a cannon and thereby sustain fatal injuries, but his efforts would ensure that the cannon would begin to fall downhill. Mic Sokoli's act of bravery motivated his fellow fighters to continue the battle, and this act is remembered today. He was 42 at the time of his death, and left behind his wife and two children, a daughter and a son. More than a century after, his great great grandson, Tahir Sinani would continue these similar activities, eventually dying during the Macedonian Conflict of 2001.

== Legacy ==
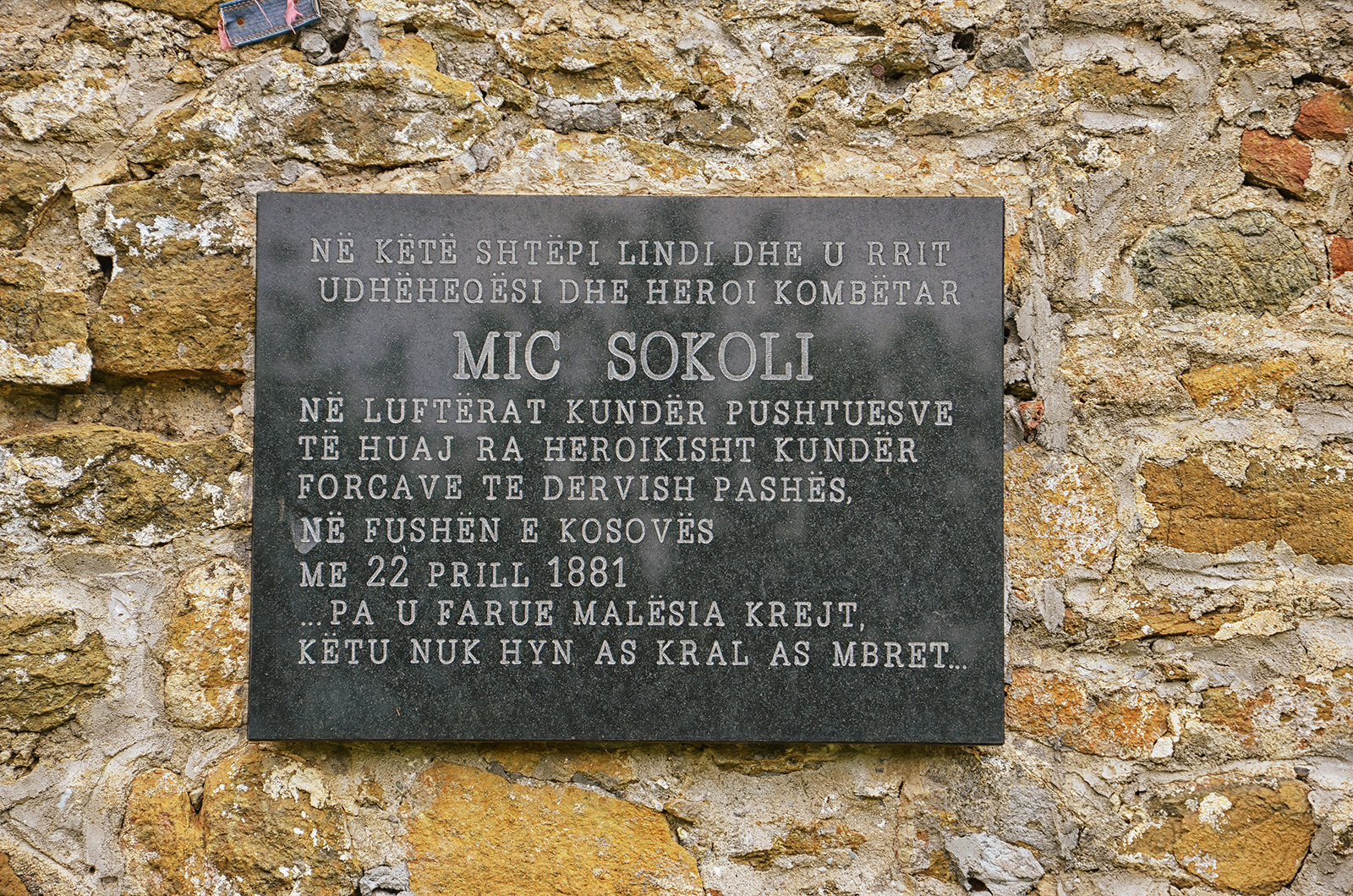
The memorial plaque on the Sokoli Kulla (Tower House) in Bujan, Tropojë, Albania

The stories of Sokoli's braveness in battles have been noted in many traditional Albanian folk songs. The Albanian communist government declared Sokoli a People's Hero of Albania. He was known for his strategic abilities, his dedication to the Albanian cause and his bravery. Many songs are dedicated to Mic Sokoli, and his actions recall era of the League of Prizren and their efforts for Albanian unity. Mic Sokoli is a notable figure of the League, known as a leader of the Krasniqi, the son of Sokol Rama. His actions turned into legend, and songs dedicated to him are performed in the present day.

Sylejman Krasniqi wrote the novel ′Mic Sokoli′, which was awarded by the Republic. Sali Shijaku's painting of Mic Sokoli's final moments as he presses his chest against the cannon was honoured with many awards. There are several artistic societies, schools etc. named after Mic Sokoli.

Below is a famous Albanian song dedicated to Mic Sokoli:

Albanian original

Mic Sokoli n’dy tagana,
Udhamarë! mi ka than nana,
Lufto bir, ti për Shqipni,
Mos i len turqit ktu me hi,
N’koftë nevoja, vi me ty.
Mic Sokoli: ni fjalë po e flet,
Po i thotë nanës: - Ti mir mbetç!
Pa u farue Malsia krejt,
Ktu nuk hin as krajl as mret!

English Translation

Mic Sokoli with two yatagans,
Safe travels! His mother said,
Fight, son, for Albania,
Do not let the Turks enter,
If need be, I'll come with you.
Mic Sokoli: speaks a word,
He says to his mother: - farewell!
Unless the Highlands are wiped out,
No one will enter, nor krajl, nor king!

== See also ==
- League of Prizren
- Sefë Kosharja
