= Albana Osmani =

Albanian model (born 1980)

- Born: Albana Osmani; 17 August 1980 (age 45); Tropojë, Albania
- Education: Academy of Music and Arts of Albania
- Occupations: Model; presenter; philanthropist
- Years active: 2000–present
- Notable credit(s): Top Channel; Albanians Got Talent

Albana Osmani (born 17 August 1980) is an Albanian philanthropist, model and former television presenter known for her appearance on Top Channel.

== Early life ==
Osmani was born in Tropojë, Albania, on 17 August 1980. When she was 13 years old, she moved to Tirana, where she attended high school. She later pursued higher education in the arts, studying at the Academy of Music and Arts of Albania.

== Career ==
Osmani's career spans television, modeling, philanthropy, and visual arts. She became known in Albania through her work with Top Channel, one of the country's main television networks, hosting the Albanians Got Talent show, which significantly boosted her popularity in Albania.

Her work often merges her artistic inclinations painting, graphics with media. She founded and leads a philanthropic organization called You Are a Sunflower 'You're a Sunflower Foundation' which supports children with serious illnesses, especially in Albania and neighboring regions.

== Personal life ==
On the show Opinion, Albana Osmani stated that she is anti-LGBTQ and against same-sex marriage and is pro-holy family.
