= Shaban Gashi =

Kosovar photographer

Shaban Gashi (1939–1990) was a Yugoslav cinematographer and photographer.

== Biography ==
Born in Prizren, Shaban Gashi began as a photographer at the age of seven and after finishing high school he enrolled at the film academy in Zagreb. During the years 1976 - 1980 he studied and obtained a diploma at the Academy of Film and Photography in Zagreb, Croatia. In the 1960s he owned a photographic firm in Croatia.

In 1971, Shaban Gashi was hired as a camera operator in the Radio Television of Belgrade In 1974 he founded "Radio Television Priština" as an independent public television station in Kosovo. With the establishment of Kosovafilm he helped build the company's first documentary film that filmed the first 35 mm in Kosovo.

He died in 1990.

== Filmography ==
=== Cameraman ===
- Shtënja në ajër (1976) (TV)
- Dita e mërgimtarëve (1975) (assistant)
- Ditari i Lec pazhecit(1975) (TV mini) (assistant)
- Trimi (1975) (TV) (assistant)
- Por (1974) (TV) (assistant)
- Pasqyra televizive (1966–1973) (TV series) (assistant) (1971–1972) (cameraman) (1971–1973)
- Shkëndija (1971) (TV) (assistant)
- Sofra (1971) (TV) (assistant)
- Të ngujuarit (1971) (TV) (assistant)

=== Cinematographer ===
- Reportezhe nga Turqia (1977) (TV)
- Bujku (1973) (TV)
- Shkolla ime (1972) (TV)
