= Bujan =

- Administrative unit
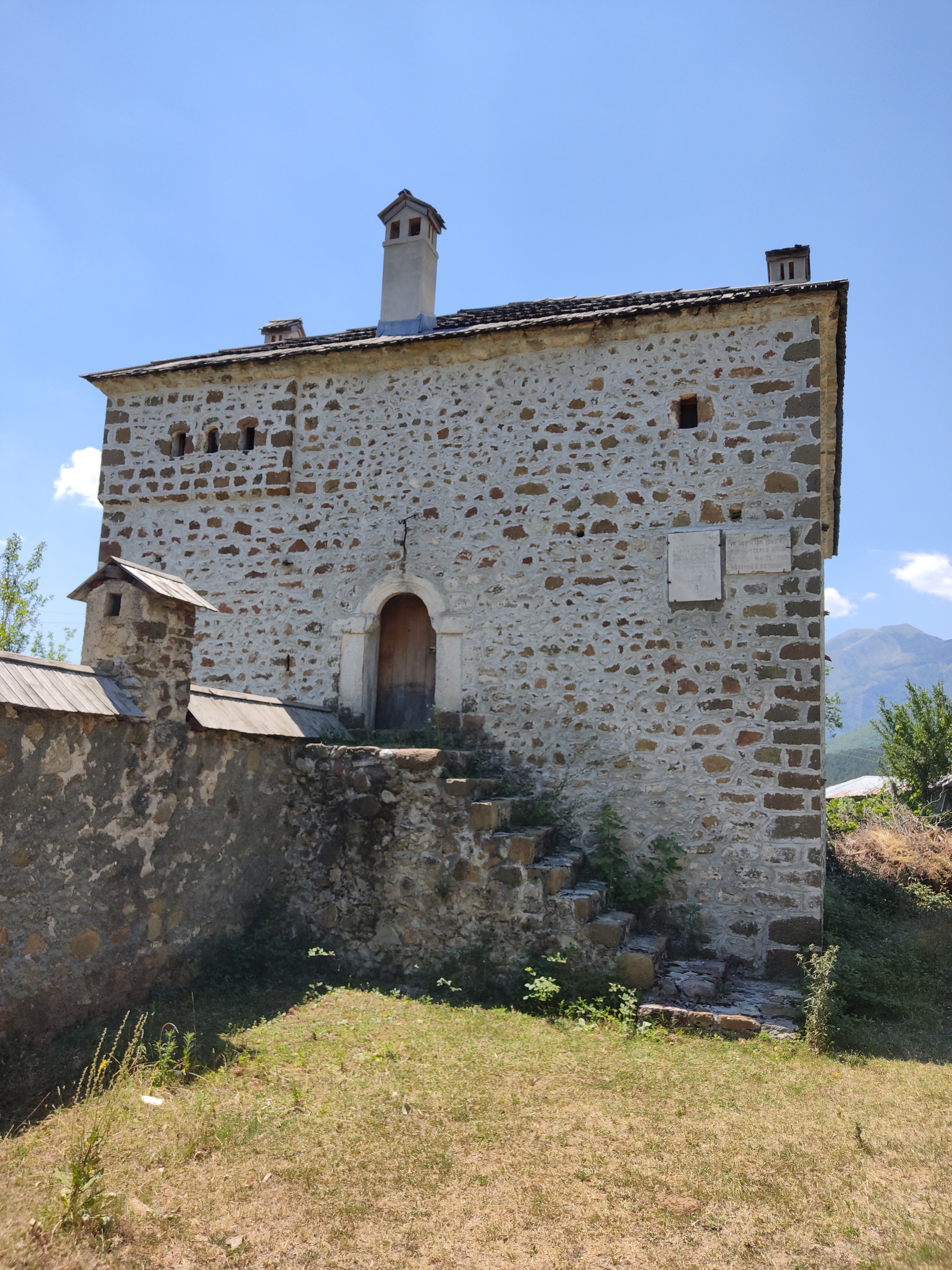
- Bujan Conference Kulla

- Location within Albania
- Coordinates: 42°19′27″N 20°4′20″E
- Country: Albania
- County: Kukës
- Municipality: Tropojë

Population (2023)
  - Administrative unit: 1,738
- Time zone: UTC+1 (CET)
  - Summer (DST): UTC+2 (CEST)

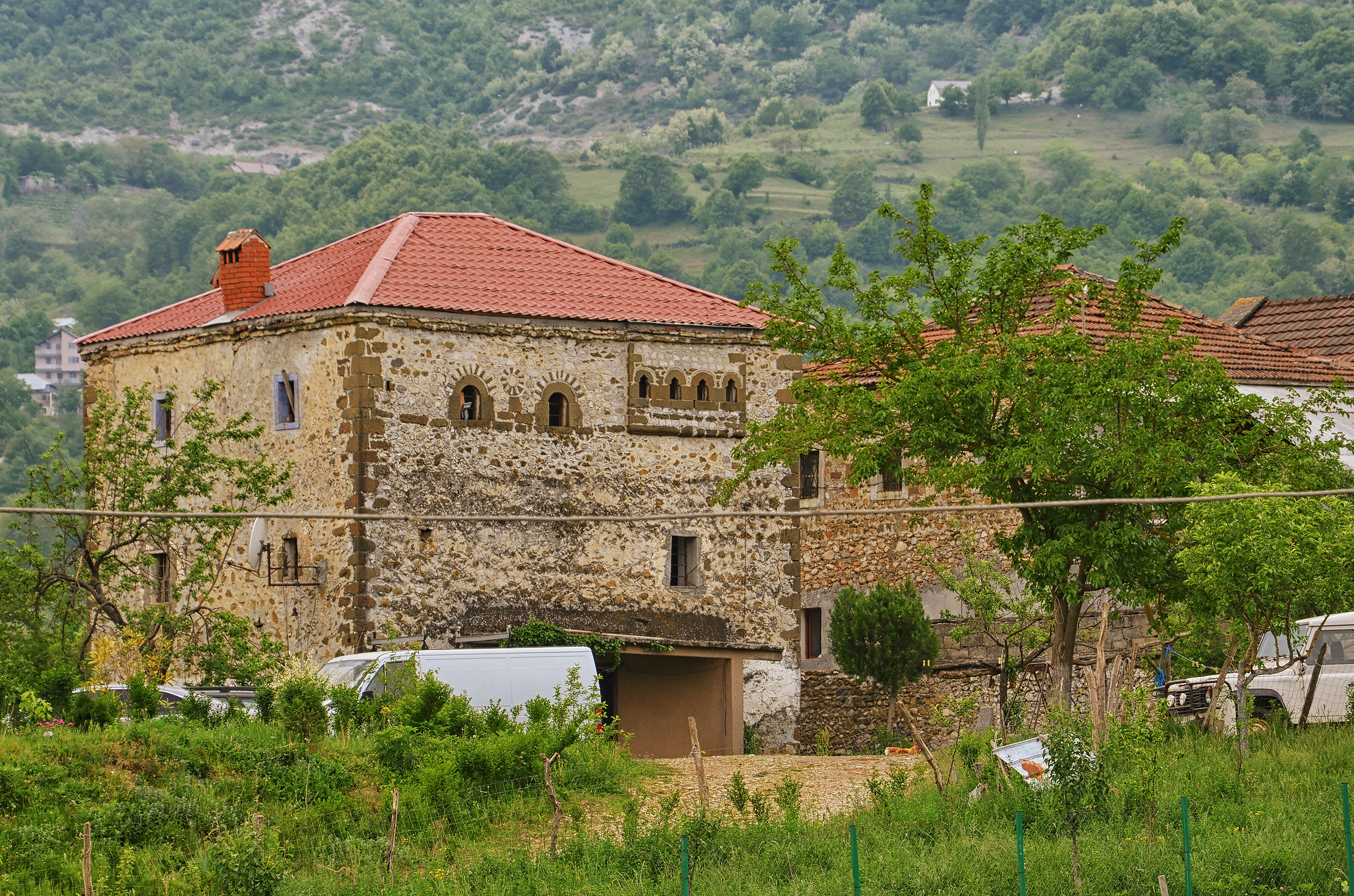
A kulla in Bujan

Bujan is a village and a former municipality in the Kukës County, northern Albania. At the 2015 local government reform it became a subdivision of the municipality Tropojë. The population at the 2023 census was 1,738.

It is part of the Highlands of Gjakova, an ethnographic region of Albanian and Kosovo, and is known for hosting the 1943 Bujan Conference.

Bujan is part of Krasniqi tribal territory.

== Etymology ==
According to Eqrem Çabej, the etymology of the village derives from a term referring to a "pond with a lot of water", but due to the location of the village, the etymology may have to do with the Albanian term bujë.

== Notable people ==
- Mic Sokoli (1839–1881), People's Hero of Albania
- Tahir Sinani (1964–2001), Albanian KLA and NLA fighter
- Binak Alia (1805–1890), leader of the Revolt of 1845, participant in the League of Prizren
