= Albin Krasniqi =

Albin Krasniqi may refer to:

- Albin Krasniqi (footballer, born 2001), football player
- Albin Krasniqi (footballer, born 2003), football player
