= Xhevdet Doda =

Xhevdet Doda (Serbo-Croatian: Џевдет Дода, Dževdet Doda; 1906–1945) was a Yugoslavian teacher by profession who was active in the resistance against German occupation in Kosovo during World War II. Doda was member of the Yugoslav Partisans and member of the Liberation Council of Kosovo. He was arrested by Gestapo in 1944 and killed in the Mauthausen concentration camp (Bicerk-1). He was posthumously proclaimed People's Hero of Yugoslavia in 1973.

== Biography ==
Doda was born in Prizren in 1906 into an ethnic Albanian family, whom spoke Albanian in the Gheg dialect. For a short time, Doda worked as a lecturer at an Albanian school in Novi Pazar, Sandžak. He was, like many other teachers, posthumously decorated with the "Naim Frashëri" title by President of Albania Sali Berisha in his Decree No. 811 of 11 April 1994, in his case for opening Albanian language schools.

During the People's Liberation War, he served as a battalion commander and deputy commander of the 1st Kosovo-Macedonia Offensive Brigade that mounted the Kosovo Operation (1944). As a member of that Brigade, he attended the Bujan Conference from 31 December 1943 to 2 January 1944. A visible decision-maker at this conference, he attracted the attention of the Gestapo, which arrested him for treason and imprisoned him in Tirana, subsequently transferring him to the Banjica concentration camp near Belgrade and then to the Mauthausen-Gusen concentration camp complex, where he died in 1945. He was subsequently declared a Hero of the People of Albania and People's Hero of Yugoslavia.
