= Trimi =

Trimi is both a surname and a given name. Notable people with the name include:

- Arjola Trimi (born 1987), Italian Paralympic swimmer
- Trimi Makolli (born 1992), Swedish footballer
