= Fatime Sokoli =

Albanian singer (1948–1987)

- Born: 18 June 1948; Dragobi village in Margegaj, Albania
- Died: 6 August 1987 (aged 39); Tropojë, Albania
- Genres: Folk
- Occupation: Singer
- Instrument: Çifteli
- Works: 1960–1987

Fatime Sokoli (18 June 1948 – 12 August 1987) was an Albanian folk singer, renowned for her powerful voice and contributions to the traditional music of Northern Albania. She is remembered as a cultural icon who broke gender barriers in a male-dominated musical tradition.

== Early life ==
Sokoli was born on 18 June 1948 in the village of Dragobi, part of the Margegaj administrative unit in Tropojë, Albania. Raised in a region steeped in Albanian patriotic traditions, she was immersed in the rich oral and musical heritage of the Gjakova Highlands from an early age. Her upbringing in this mountainous area deeply influenced her artistic development.

At the age of 12, Sokoli made her first public appearance during a commemorative event at the Cave of Bajram Curri, where she performed a song dedicated to the national hero. Dressed in traditional male attire and playing the çifteli, a traditional Albanian string instrument, her performance astonished attendees and marked the beginning of her musical journey. This act was particularly significant as it challenged prevailing gender norms, with Sokoli becoming one of the first women in her region to perform publicly with the çifteli.

== Career ==
Recognizing her talent, local authorities facilitated Sokoli's enrollment at the "Jordan Misja" Artistic Lyceum in Tirana, where she pursued formal music education. Upon completing her studies, she returned to Tropojë and began working as a music teacher while actively participating in the local Folk Ensemble.

Sokoli's repertoire primarily consisted of songs celebrating Albanian history, heroism, and the natural beauty of the Northern Highlands. Her performances were characterized by a deep emotional resonance and a commitment to preserving and promoting traditional Albanian music. She gained widespread acclaim across Albania, Kosovo, North Macedonia, and various European countries, often participating in national folklore festivals, including those held in Gjirokastër.

Throughout her career, Sokoli received numerous accolades for her contributions to folk music, solidifying her status as a leading figure in Albanian cultural heritage.

== Personal life and death ==
Sokoli died on 12 August 1987, at the age of 39, after a battle with kidney disease's. She never married or had any child.
