= Gaspër Krasniqi =

Roman Catholic priest

Gaspër Krasniqi (died 1876; in Italian: Gasparo or Gaspare Crasnich), also referred as Joshtar Krasnik, Gashpar Krasnik, or Don Karlo Krasnik, was an Albanian Roman Catholic priest who served as Vicar Apostolic of the Diocese of Skopje.

Krasniqi served as abbot of the St. Alexander church in Orosh, Mirdita, in today's Albania. On 24 June 1839, he was appointed Vicar Apostolic of the Roman Catholic Diocese of Skopje.
In 1849, he functioned as intermediate between Bid Doda Pasha and Mark Prenk Lleshi, representatives of Mirdita, and the Internal Minister of the Principality of Serbia Ilija Garašanin, regarding Mirdita's cooperation with Serbia and Montenegro against the Ottoman Empire. Again, during the Montenegrin–Ottoman War (1861–62), he helped organizing the Northern Albanian Catholic tribes for an uprising against the Ottomans, with the support of French emissaries of Napoleon III. He was subsequently arrested by the Ottomans.
He died in 1876.

== See also ==
- Pjeter Bogdani
- Krasniqi
