= Faculty of Islamic Studies (Pristina) =

Islamic higher education institution in Kosovo

The Faculty of Islamic Studies (FSI; Albanian: Fakulteti i Studimeve Islame) is a higher education institution based in Pristina, Kosovo.

== History ==
Seeing the need for higher-quality Islamic education in Kosovo, the Islamic Community of Kosova Assembly founded the Faculty of Islamic Studies under by-law 443/92. The school began operations in December 1992, electing Dr. Rexhep Boja its first dean, Mr. Quemajl Morina as its first vice dean, and Sabri Bajgora as its first secretary.

The first seminar on Islamic apologetics was given by the doyen of Islamic journalism in Kosovo, Sherif Ahmeti, who taught a course for three years on aqidah.

Enrollment and employment were light in the early days, with only one doctor of science, one master’s holder, and a few other theologians on staff. By its 10th anniversary in 2002, however, the school had graduated 4 doctors of Islamic Sciences, 5 masters’ candidates, and 6 lecturer-theologians preaching in Cairo, Beirut, Amman, and Damascus among other places.

== Student amenities ==
Students enroll from throughout the Albanian diaspora, including Kosovo, North Macedonia, Montenegro, Albania, and the Preševo Valley. A Student Association organizes events such as conferences with FSI and visiting professors. The student publication is known as Zgjimi Islam (“Islamic Awakening”).

The FSI library includes several hundred old manuscripts and several thousand theological and other spiritual works.
