= Binak Alia =

Albanian activist and leader from the Highlands of Gjakova

- Born: 1805; Bujan, Tropojë, past Ottoman Empire, present-day Albania
- Died: 1895 (aged 89–90)
- Other names: Binak Alija; Binak Ali Mulosmanaj
- Known for: Albanian Revolt of 1845

Binak Alia (1805–1895) was an Albanian leader from the Highlands of Gjakova. He is remembered mainly for his participation in the Albanian Revolt of 1845, and as a wise old man who helped resolve blood feuds in the area.

== Life ==
Alia was born in 1805 in Bujan, Ottoman Empire, in present day Tropojë municipality of Albania. He belonged to the Mulosmanaj clan of the Krasniqi tribe. He is mentioned as the Albanian Revolt of 1845, together with Sokol Rama (1790-1860) from the same village. The revolt was in the chain of Albanian revolts against the Sublime Porte and especially against Tanzimat reforms. The rebels were initially successful. They drove out the Ottoman garrison of Yakova. The revolt spread in the area of Reka, and in up to Deçan, with their number reaching 8,000. Ultimately the Ottomans managed to quell the revolt.

His name is mentioned again during the Revolts of 1860, and specifically as a participant of the League of Prizren sessions, though at an old age. Another note, Mic Sokoli, a People's Hero of Albania was Alia's nephew.

== Trivia ==
Alia is remembered as a wise man. Numerous blood feuds were resolved with his intervention. People from around the highland came to his oda to discuss and receive advice conforming to the Kanun law.

A street in Tirana, Albania is named after him.

== See also ==
- Sulejman Vokshi
- Albanian Revolt of 1843–44
- Sefë Kosharja
