= Shefqet Krasniqi =

Kosovar Muslim cleric and scholar of Islam

Haxhi Dr. Shefqet Krasniqi
- Title: Hoxhë

Personal life
- Born: June 20, 1966 in Siboc, Obiliq, Kosovo
- Region: Europe
- Main interest(s): Hadith, Fiqh, Tajweed

Religious life
- Religion: Sunni Islam
- Jurisprudence: Hanafi

Shefqet Krasniqi (born June 20, 1966) is a Kosovar Muslim cleric and scholar of Islam. He formerly held posts of lecturer at the Faculty of Islamic Studies (Pristina) and Imam of the Imperial Mosque (Pristina). He is an expert in Islamic law, author, translator and publisher.

Krasniqi has been the focus of controversy for his provocative comments concerning other faith communities, traditional gender roles and alleged radicalism. His name was mentioned in the U.S. State Department’s "International Religious Freedom Report for 2013" for allegedly negative views of the Catholic community and "anti-Semitic rhetoric".

He was acquitted by a Pristina Basic Court panel on hate incitement charges in March 2018.

== Biography ==
Krasniqi was born in the village of Sibofc, Obiliq municipality, Kosovo. He attended high school at the local madrassa "Alauddin" in Pristina. In 1986, he enrolled and later graduated from Medina University in Saudi Arabia, where he attained a doctorate in Islamic jurisprudence (fiqh). He left Medina and fought for the Kosovo Liberation Army in 1999, Returning to Medina after the war and living in Kosovo starting in 2001. Upon returning to Kosovo, Krasniqi was appointed professor at the Faculty of Islamic Studies, and later Imam at the Great Mosque in Pristina. He held the position of professor for five consecutive years while also functioning as Imam.

== Legal Controversies ==
Shefqet Krasniqi was taken in for questioning by Kosovo Police during September 2014, in an operation aimed at curbing the recruitment of fighters to join radical Islamic groups in Syria and Iraq. Despite being dismissed from his position at the Grand Mosque in 2015, Krasniqi was later released and continued to preach publicly on television, radio, and social media websites.

On February 27, 2017, Kosovo’s Special Prosecutor (SPRK) filed an indictment against Krasniqi, on charges of inciting terrorism, propagating national, racial, and religious intolerance and tax evasion. The indictment alleged that Krasniqi intentionally distributed public messages classifying some religious groups as enemies of Sunni Muslims, inciting and spreading hatred, disunity and intolerance of other religious groups. The indictment also contended that Krasniqi used harsh language during his sermons, promoted via online social networks, encouraging others to travel to conflict zones in Syria and Iraq and commit terrorist acts.

On March 23, 2018, a Pristina Basic Court panel acquitted Shefqet Krasniqi of all charges from the 2017 indictment. The presiding judge cited contradictory statements and lack of evidence as reasons for the acquittal. On October 1, 2018, the appellate court upheld the lower court’s decision, acquitting Krasniqi on all charges.
