= Shkelqim Krasniqi =

Swedish footballer

Personal information
- Date of birth: 18 February 1996 (age 30)
- Place of birth: Borås, Sweden
- Height: 1.81 m (5 ft 11 in)
- Position: Forward

Team information
- Current team: Husqvarna

Youth career
- Norrby
- Elfsborg

Senior career*
Years	Team	Apps	(Gls)
2014–2016	GAIS	20	(2)
2015	→ Qviding (loan)	9	(2)
2016–2019	Norrby	28	(2)
2018	→ Husqvarna (loan)	8	(3)
2019	Sparta	3	(0)
2019–	Husqvarna	17	(6)

International career^{‡}
2014	Sweden U18	5	(1)
2015	Sweden U19	2	(0)
- * Club domestic league appearances and goals as of 20 December 2019 ‡ National team caps and goals as of 18:02, 22 July 2019 (UTC)

Shkelqim Krasniqi (born 18 February 1996) is a Swedish footballer who currently plays as a forward for Husqvarna.

== Club career ==
In August 2018, Norrby sent him on loan to Husqvarna, who loaned him to Greek side Sparta in February 2019.

== Career statistics ==
=== Club ===
As of 22 July 2019.

Club	Season	League			Cup		Other		Total	
Club	Season	Division	Apps	Goals	Apps	Goals	Apps	Goals	Apps	Goals
GAIS	2014	Superettan	7	2	0	0	0	0	7	2
GAIS	2015	Superettan	9	0	2 (Note: Appearances in the Svenska Cupen)	0	0	0	11	0
GAIS	2016	Superettan	4	0	0	0	0	0	4	0
GAIS	Total		20	2	2	0	0	0	22	2
Qviding (loan)	2015	Division 1	9	2	0	0	0	0	9	2
Norrby	2016	Division 1	9	1	0	0	0	0	9	1
Norrby	2017	Superettan	14	0	2	0	0	0	16	0
Norrby	2018	Superettan	5	1	0	0	0	0	5	1
Norrby	Total		28	2	2	0	0	0	30	2
Sparta	2018–19	Football League	3	0	0	0	0	0	3	0
Husqvarna	2019	Division 2	13	6	1	1	0	0	14	7
Career total			73	12	5	1	0	0	78	13
