= Vanessa Krasniqi =

German singer of Albanian origin (born 1994)

- Born: 22 June 1994 (age 30); Iserlohn, Germany
- Genres: Pop, R&B
- Occupation: Singer
- Instruments: Vocals
- Years active: 2008–present

Vanessa Krasniqi (born 22 June 1994) is a German singer of Albanian origin. She rose to fame after taking part in the ninth season of the German talent show Deutschland sucht den Superstar. In 2008 she was a participant at Das Supertalent where she achieved 4th place.

== Biography ==
Vanessa Krasniqi was born in 1994 in Iserlohn, North Rhine-Westphalia to a German mother and an Albanian father from Kosovo. She attended both elementary and high school in her hometown and continued to pursue her professional career.

In 2008 she decided to join Das Supertalent, a national talent show. In her first audition, she received a standing ovation from the judging panel and the audience. She reached the final and was ranked fourth overall.

In 2012 she challenged herself for a talent show again, this time for DSDS, the German franchise of Idols. She successfully passed the first stages of the show and earned a place in the live shows. She was eliminated in the Top 8 on 17 March. Considered a frontrunner of her season, her early elimination shocked the judges and her fellow contestants. RTL stated that she won't return despite angry fans protesting.
