= Matej Krasniqi =

Albanian Catholic cleric (1763-1827 or 1829)

Matej Krasniqi (1763 - 1827 or 1829 ), also referred as Matteo Granisch or Matthaeus Crasnich, was an Albanian Catholic cleric, who served as Archbishop of the Roman Catholic Diocese of Skopje from 8 March 1816 to 1829.

He was born in Prizren on 11 January 1763. He was appointed Archbishop of Diocese of Skopje on 8 March 1816, and ordained bishop on 22 September the same year. He died on October 25, 1827.

== See also ==
- Krasniqi
