= Hysni Krasniqi =

Albanian painter

- Born: March 10, 1942 (age 84)
- Known for: Painting

Hysni Krasniqi^{[a]} (born 10 March 1942 in Lukare/Llukar, near Pristina) is an Albanian painter and graphic artist. After studying art in Pristina he went to Belgrade where he graduated from the Academy of Figurative Arts of Belgrade in 1969.

Thereafter he taught at the Academy of Figurative Arts of Pristina. His works are primarily inspired by rural landscapes and farms.

== Notes ==
a.	Albanian spelling: Hysni Krasniqi, Serbian spelling: Хисни Краснићи, Hisni Krasnići.
