= Koshare, Ferizaj =

Village in Kosovo

Koshare
- Village
- Interactive map of Koshare
- Location within Kosovo
- Coordinates: 42°25′4″N 21°5′46″E
- Country: Kosovo
- District: Ferizaj
- Municipality: Ferizaj

Population (2024)
  - Total: 1,783
- Time zone: UTC+1 (CET)
  - Summer (DST): UTC+2 (CEST)

Koshare is a village in Ferizaj Municipality, Kosovo. According to the Kosovo Agency of Statistics (KAS) from the 2024 census, there were 1,783 people residing in Koshare, with Albanians constituting the majority of the population.
