= Tropojë =

Municipality in Albania

- Municipality
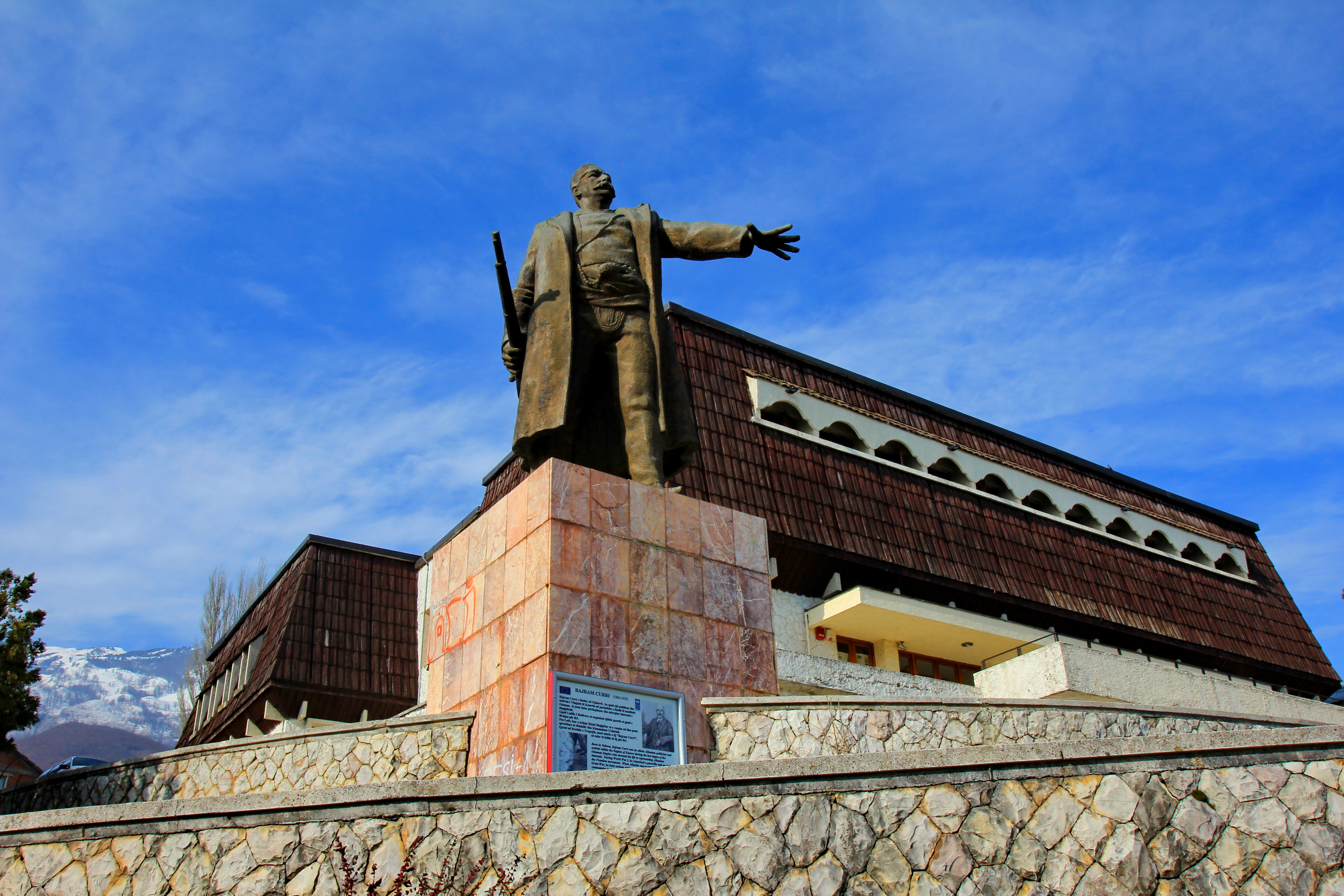
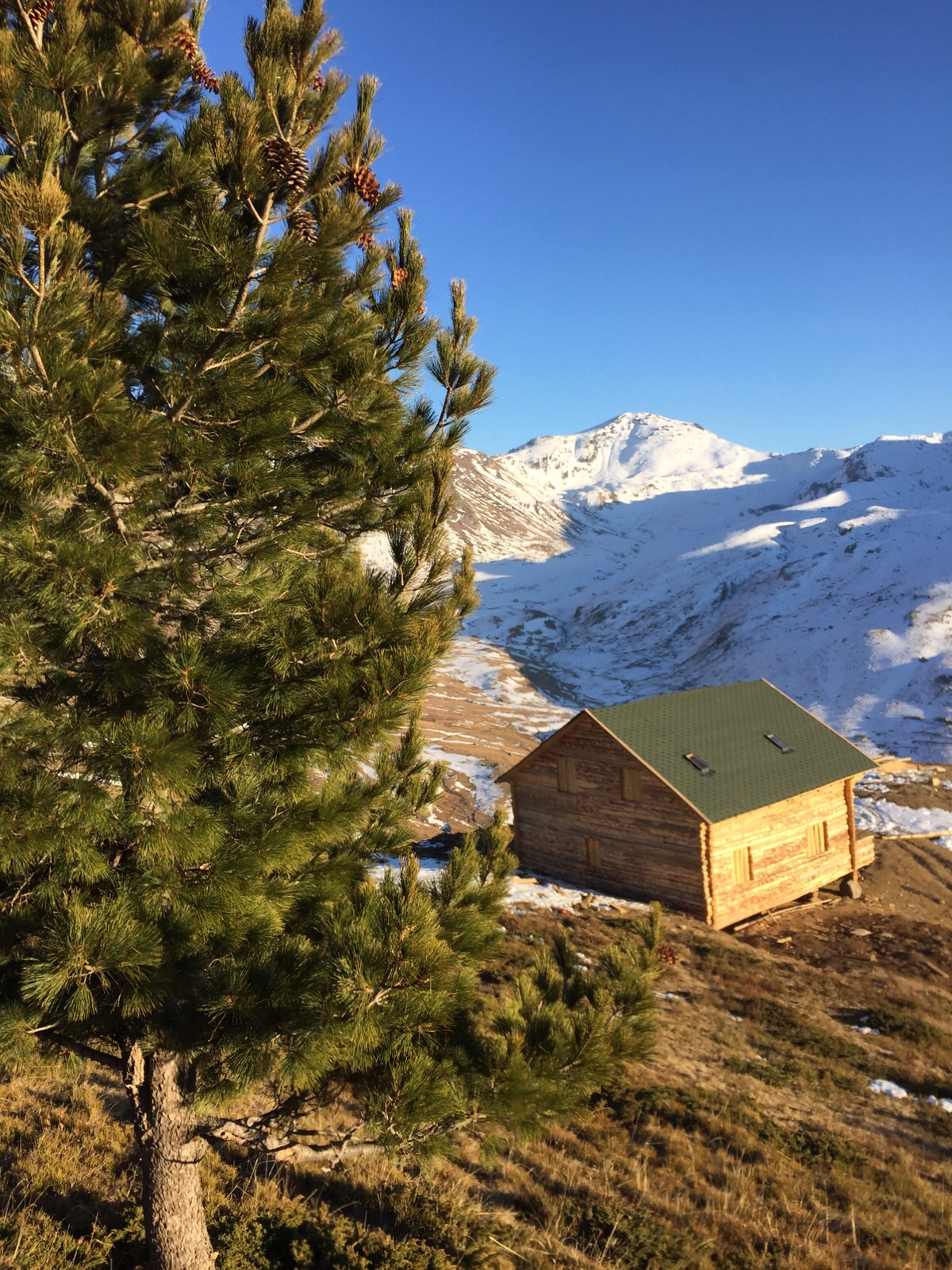
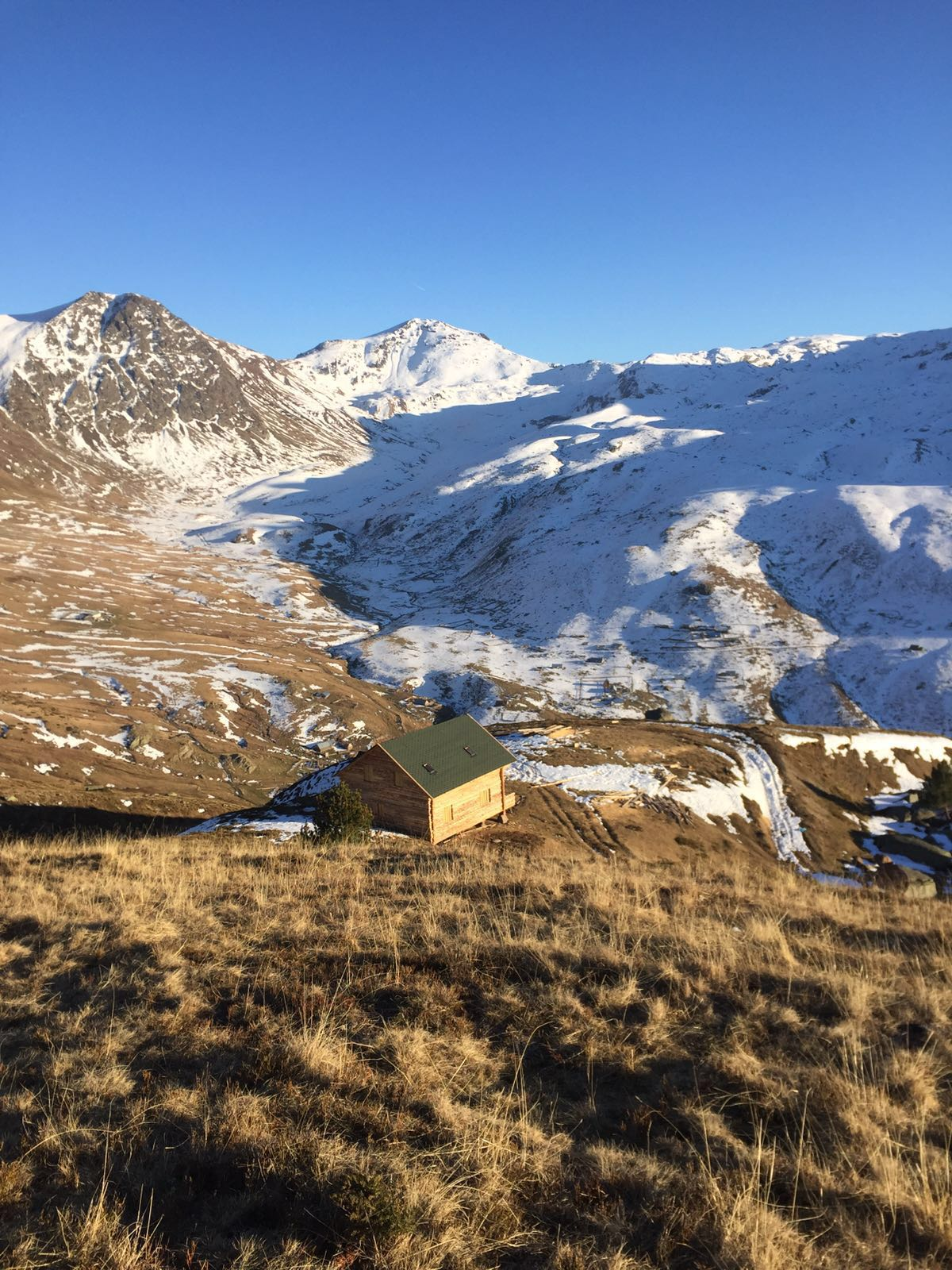
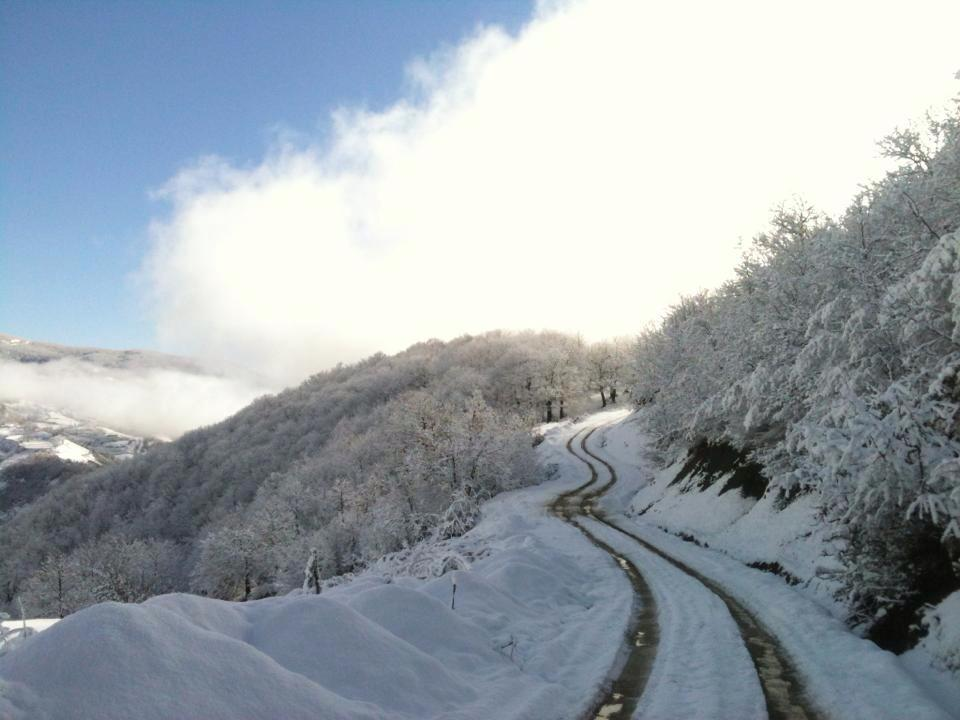
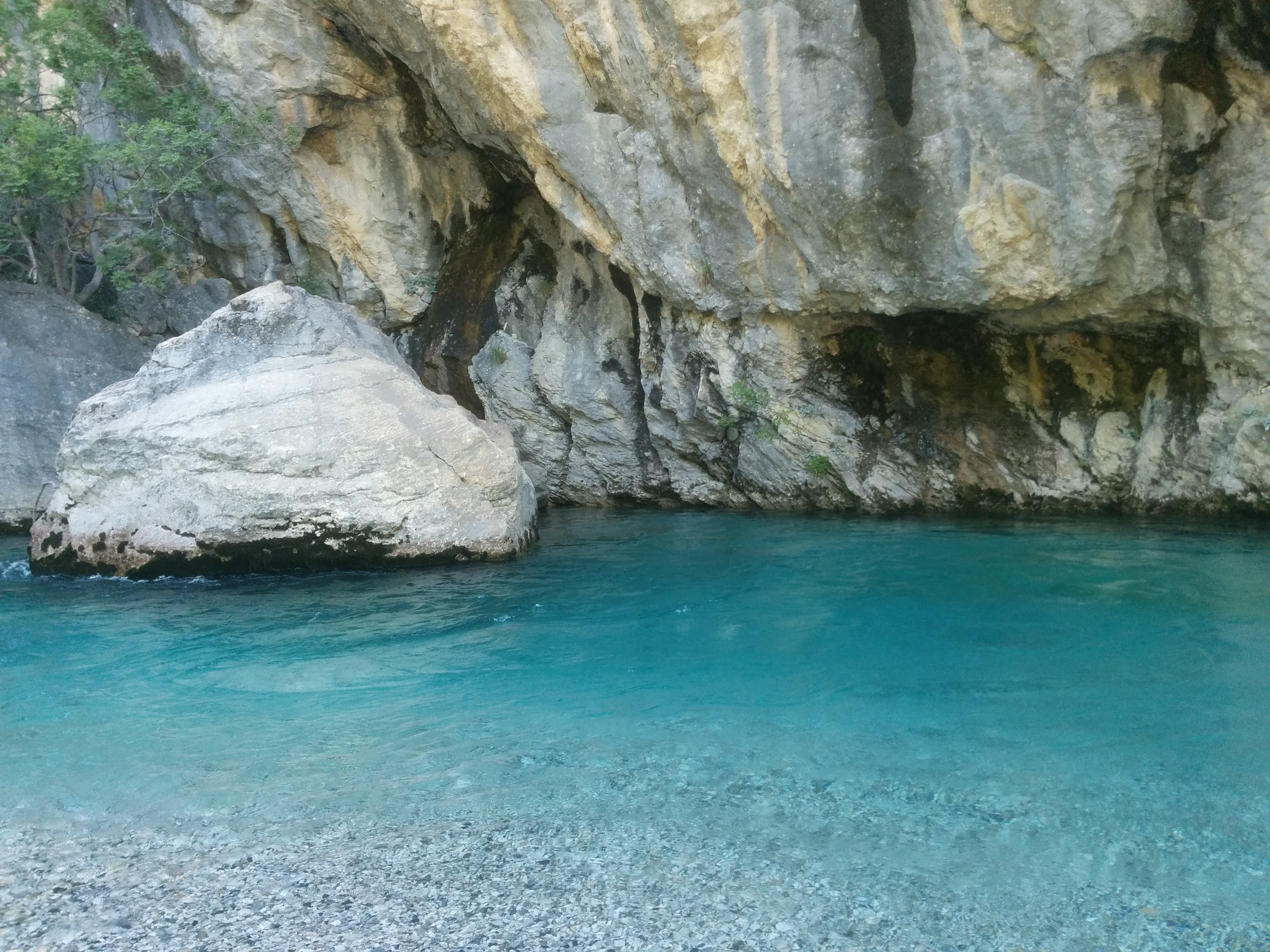
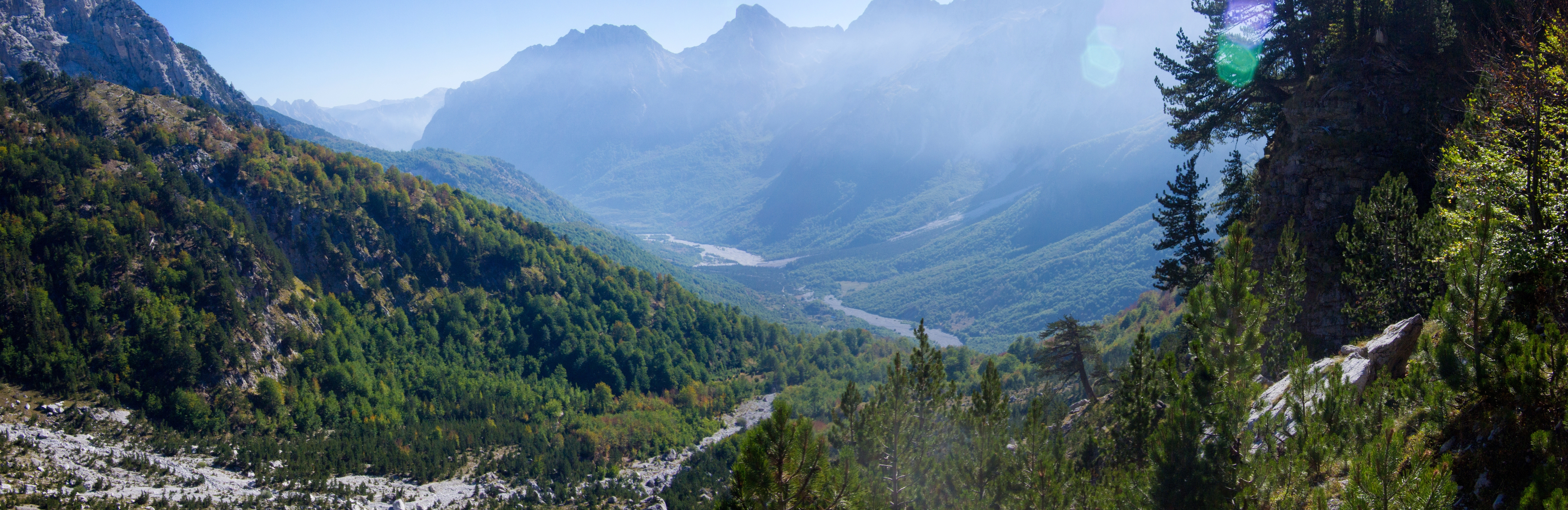
- Clockwise from top: Monument of Bajram Curri with the ethnographic museum in the background, popular tourist destination of Doberdol, Snowing in Tropojë, the Valbonë River and the panoramic view of Valbonë National Park

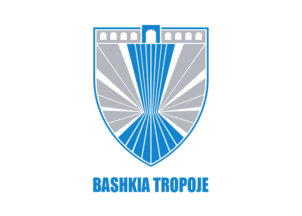
- Flag Emblem

- Location within Albania
- Coordinates: 42°24′N 20°10′E
- Country: Albania
- County: Kukës

Government
  - Mayor: Rexhë Byberi (PS)

Area
  - Municipality: 1,043 km^{2} (403 sq mi)

Population (2023)
  - Municipality: 14,189
  - Municipality density: 13.60/km^{2} (35.23/sq mi)
  - Administrative unit: 2,560
- Demonym(s): Albanian: Tropojan (m), Tropojane (f)
- Time zone: UTC+1 (CET)
  - Summer (DST): UTC+2 (CEST)
- Postal Code: 8702-8703
- Area Code: (0)213
- Website: tropoje.gov.al

Tropojë (Albanian: [tɾɔˈpɔjə]; Albanian definite form: Tropoja) is a municipality in Kukës County, northeastern Albania, within the historical ethnographic region of the Gjakova Highlands. The municipality consists of the administrative units of Bajram Curri, Bujan, Bytyç, Fierzë, Lekbibaj, Llugaj, Margegaj and Tropojë, that became municipal units. The seat of the municipality is the town Bajram Curri. As of the Institute of Statistics 2023 census, there were 2,560 people residing in the municipal unit Tropojë and 14,189 in the municipality.

== Etymology ==
Tropojë's old name was Trebopolje and is recorded in Serbian medieval charters and Ottoman registers. The word itself comes from the old Slavic trebiti, ‘to clean’, and polje, ‘field’, i.e. ‘clean field’.

== History ==
The region was inhabited by Illyrian tribes. Archaeological evidence found in the area, such as castles or tumuli, shows that the area has been populated since the ancient time. The region lies in the geographical span of the Dardani tribes.

== Geography ==
Tropojë Municipality is located on the bank of Valbonë River between the Albanian Alps in northeastern Albania bordering Montenegro to the northwest and Kosovo to the northeast and east. Valbonë Valley National Park sprawls in the northwest of Tropojë and protects the Valbonë Valley and the Gashi River, which has been inscribed on the UNESCO World Heritage list as portion of the Ancient and Primeval Beech Forests of the Carpathians and Other Regions of Europe. The area of the municipality is 1,057.3 km^{2} (408.2 sq mi).

=== Climate ===
According to the Köppen climate classification, Tropojë falls under the periphery of the oceanic climate (Köppen climate classification: Cfb) zone with an average annual temperature of 10.2 °C (50.4 °F).

Climate data for Tropojë
Month	Jan	Feb	Mar	Apr	May	Jun	Jul	Aug	Sep	Oct	Nov	Dec	Year
Mean daily maximum °C (°F)	4.1 (39.4)	6.8 (44.2)	11.7 (53.1)	16.4 (61.5)	21.2 (70.2)	25.1 (77.2)	27.6 (81.7)	27.8 (82.0)	23.6 (74.5)	17.2 (63.0)	10.4 (50.7)	5.8 (42.4)	16.5 (61.7)
Daily mean °C (°F)	0.9 (33.6)	3.0 (37.4)	7.2 (45.0)	11.4 (52.5)	15.8 (60.4)	19.6 (67.3)	21.7 (71.1)	21.8 (71.2)	17.9 (64.2)	12.4 (54.3)	6.9 (44.4)	2.7 (36.9)	11.8 (53.2)
Mean daily minimum °C (°F)	−2.3 (27.9)	−0.7 (30.7)	2.7 (36.9)	6.4 (43.5)	10.5 (50.9)	14.1 (57.4)	15.9 (60.6)	15.8 (60.4)	12.2 (54.0)	7.7 (45.9)	3.4 (38.1)	−0.3 (31.5)	7.1 (44.8)
Average precipitation mm (inches)	115 (4.5)	103 (4.1)	98 (3.9)	99 (3.9)	92 (3.6)	66 (2.6)	55 (2.2)	58 (2.3)	88 (3.5)	112 (4.4)	143 (5.6)	137 (5.4)	1,166 (46)

== Notable people ==
- Albana Osmani
- Azem Hajdari
- Besnik Mustafaj
- Binak Alia
- Erjon Dollapi
- Fatime Sokoli
- Haxhi Zeka
- Marko Hoxha
- Mic Sokoli
- Sali Berisha
- Shpend Dragobia
- Skënder Gega
- Soni Malaj
- Marco from Tropojë, a character from Taken
