= Gashi (river) =

River in Albanian Alps and a tourist attraction in Albania

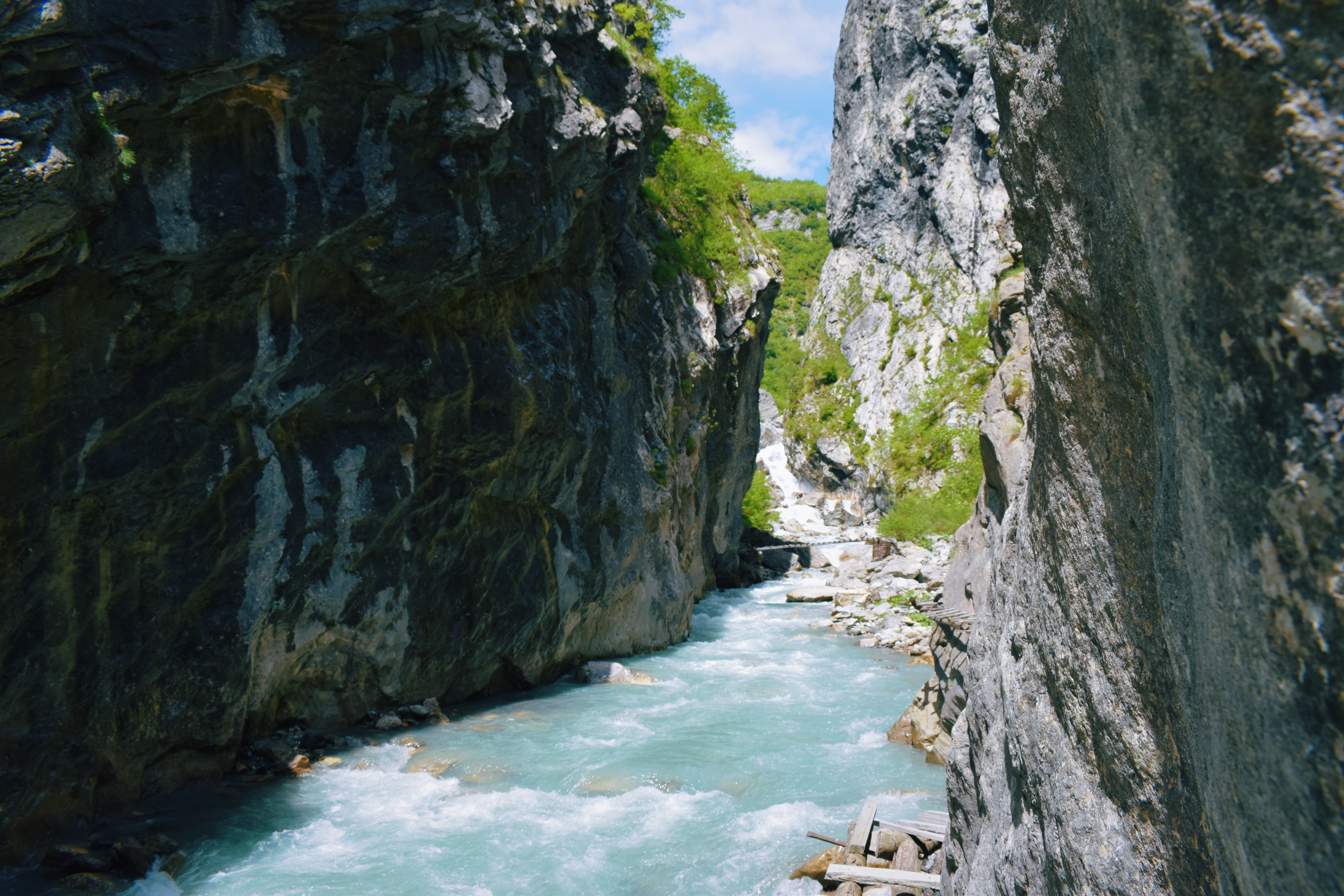
- Gashi River

Location
- Country: Albania
- County: Kukës

Physical characteristics
- Mouth: Valbona
  - coordinates: 42°22′37″N 20°5′47″E
- Length: 27 km (17 mi)

Basin features
- Progression: Valbona→ Drin→ Adriatic Sea

The Gashi (Albanian: Lumi i Gashit) is a 27-kilometre-long (17 mi) river located in Tropojë, northern Albania. It was a nature reserve, spanning an area of 3,000 ha (7,400 acres). The nature reserve forms a part of the European Green Belt and has been declared a UNESCO World Heritage Site within the Primeval Beech Forests of the Carpathians and Other Regions of Europe. In 2022, the protected area was amalgamated to form the Alps of Albania National Park.

The river is located in the eastern part of the Albanian Alps at 2,175 m (7,136 ft) above sea level. It originates at the Dobërdol Pass 2,238 m (7,343 ft) and flows along numerous peaks including the Trekufiri 2,354 m (7,723 ft) in the north, Maja Bogiçaj 2,405 m (7,890 ft) in the northeast and Maja e Shpatit 2,199 m (7,215 ft) in the northwest. The various streams, flowing first to the north and northwest, merge with the Dobërdol pasture in the northwest, then leaving the basin westward. A few kilometres further, the river changes its course southwards and stops the direction in the sequence. It passes the Maja e Shkëlzenit 2,405 m (7,890 ft) on its western side. Farther south, the river passes through a narrow gorge and valley to the Tropoja basin, where the river below flows into the Valbonë river.

The climate is subarctic and oceanic, having cool summers and generally cold winters. Forests occupy the majority of the region's area. The region falls within the Balkan mixed forests and Dinaric Mountains mixed forests terrestrial ecoregion of the Palearctic temperate broadleaf and mixed forests biome. The river is particularly known for the diversity of flora and fauna and is surrounded by swamps and canals that drain the whole local basin such as the region of Malësia e Gashit within the Albanian Alps into the Adriatic sea. Forests occupy the majority of the total area.

The diverse flora is characterized with high endemism due to the combination of southern geographic latitude and high altitude variation. The forests are host to several plants such as beech, Macedonian pine, Bosnian pine, Norway spruce, and silver fir. The fauna is represented by 64 species of mammals, such as the brown bear, gray wolf, chamois, lynx, roe deer, wild boar, western capercaillie, golden eagle, Eurasian otter and 14 species of amphibians.

== See also ==
- Geography of Albania
- Protected areas of Albania
- World Heritage Sites in Albania
- Central Mountain Range
- Valbonë river
- Rivers of Albania
