= Valbona =

Valbona may refer to:

Spain:

- Valbona, Spain, a town

Albania:

- Valbonë, a town
- Valbonë (river)
- Valbona Valley
- Valbona Valley National Park
