= Trekufiri =

Mountain in the Balkans

- Tromedja
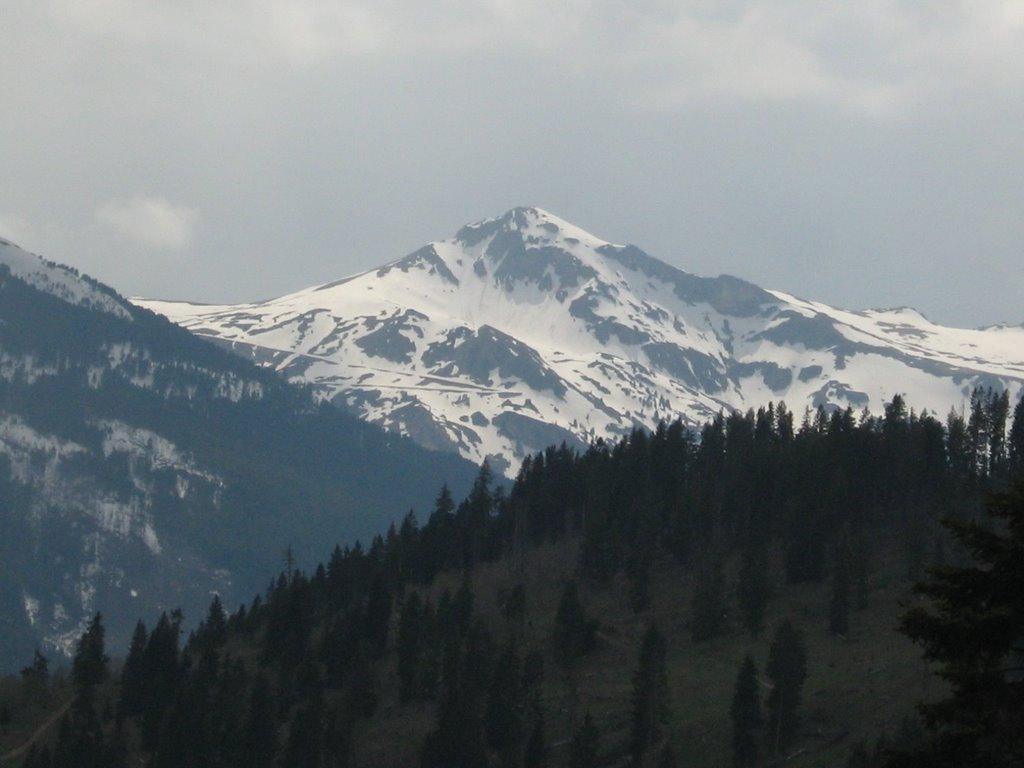
- View of Trekufiri/Tromedja

Highest point
- Elevation: 2,366 m (7,762 ft)
- Prominence: 65 m (213 ft)
- Isolation: 855 m (2,805 ft)
- Coordinates: 42°33′20″N 20°04′46″E

Naming
- English translation: The three-border point

Geography
- Location within Kosovo Location within Montenegro Location within Albania
- Countries: Kosovo; Montenegro; Albania
- Region: Albanian Alps
- Municipality: Junik
- Parent range: Accursed Mountains, Bogićevica

Trekufiri (lit. 'The three-border point'), also known as Tromedja or Тромеђа in Montenegrin Cyrillic, is a mountain located in the Albanian Alps and the Bogićevica range. Perched at 2,366 m (7,762 ft) above sea level, its summit marks the border where Albania, Kosovo and Montenegro intersect. The height of the three-country point varies, with Albanian maps recording the mountain's height as 2,354 m (7,723 ft) (Note: Official map 1:50'000 of the military cartographic office of Albania, sheet K-34-53-A, 1979.) above sea level while official Yugoslavian sources state it as 2,366 m.

After the dissolution of Serbia and Montenegro in 2006, followed by the establishment of the Republic of Kosovo two years later, a binational administrative three-point border emerged.

== Geology ==
Trekufiri is situated in the heart of the Albanian Alps and Bogićevica range, where three ridges converge. The mountain ranges to the west on the Albania-Montenegro border are slightly less elevated. The ridge to the southeast, which forms the border between Albania and Kosovo, leads to Bogiçaj 2,405 m (7,890 ft). The highest mountain in the region, Gjeravica 2,656 m (8,714 ft), is located another four kilometers southeast. The ridge from Trekufiri to the north with the border between Kosovo and Montenegro leads to Maja e Madhe 2,372 m (7,782 ft) after about three kilometers.

The mountain is surrounded by steep grassy slopes that extend up to the peaks. Lim river drains the area to the northwest, which eventually flows into the Black Sea via the Drina, Sava, and Danube. The White Drin catchment basin is located northeast of the mountain. The southern slopes are part of the upper Gashi river basin, a tributary of Valbona, which then flows into Drin, finally discharging into the Adriatic Sea.

== Accommodations ==
On the Albanian side, about 500 meters below the summit, can be found the village of Dobërdol. Inhabited by shepherds in the summer months, the settlement also provides lodging for hikers. The long-distance hiking trail Peaks of the Balkans leads along the slopes of the mountain. The route does not lead over the summit, but determined hikers can easily ascend it.

== See also ==
- List of mountains in Kosovo
- List of mountains in Montenegro
- List of mountains in Albania
