= Thate =

Thate may refer to:

== People ==
- Ajahn Thate (1902–1994), Thai Buddhist teacher and writer
- Carole Thate (born 1971), Dutch former field hockey player
- Hilmar Thate (1931–2016), German actor

== Other uses ==
- Tȟaté (god), a wind spirit in Lakota mythology
- Maja e Thatë, a mountain peak of the Albanian Alps
- Mali i Thatë, a mountain in southeast Albania
