= Shkëlzen (given name) =

- Gender: Male

Origin
- Origin: Shkëlzen, a mountain in northern Albania
- Region of origin: Albania

Other names
- Related names: Shkëlzeni

Shkëlzen is an Albanian masculine given name, taken from the mountain of the same name in northern Albania. Notable people bearing the name Shkëlzen include:

- Shkëlzen Baftiari (born 1986), Albanian pianist and educator
- Shkëlzen Doli (born 1971), Albanian pianist
- Shkëlzen Gashi (born 1988), Albanian footballer
- Shkëlzen Haradinaj (1970–1999), Kosovo Liberation Army soldier
- Shkëlzen Kelmendi (born 1985), Albanian footballer
- Shkëlzen Maliqi (born 1947), Kosovar philosopher, art critic, and political analyst
- Shkëlzen Ruçi (born 1992), Albanian footballer
- Shkëlzen Shala (born 1983), Albanian entrepreneur and veganism activist
