= International Film Summerfest of Durrës =

Durrës International Film Summerfest
- International Film Summerfest of Durrës logo
- Location: Durrës, Albania
- Founded: 2008
- Directors: Anila Varfi
- Producers: Elkjana Gjipali, Jonid Jorgji
- Festival date: late August/early September
- Language: Albanian; English
- Website: www.ifsdurres.al

The Durrës International Film Festival or Durrës International Film Summerfest, officially International Film Summerfest of Durrës (Albanian: Festivali Ndërkombëtar Veror i Filmit në Durrës, is the newest international film festival in Albania. Founded by Durrës Municipality in 2008, the festival has since taken place every year in late August or early September on Durrës Amphitheatre in Durrës, Albania.

The 7th Festival is taking place from 9 to 14 September 2014.

== Awards ==
The Film Festival's principal awards are the Gladiatori i Artë (Golden Gladiator), which is awarded to the best film screened in competition at the festival.. The Jury may also choose to award a Special Gladiator for an overall work to a director or actor of a film presented in the main competition section.

=== Golden Gladiator winners ===
The Golden Gladiator is the festival's highest award for best film in the competition section Durrës (plus the number of the edition).

=== Special Jury Prize ===
A Special Jury Prize is awarded to one or two films in most years.
