= List of World Heritage Sites in Albania =

Location of World Heritage Sites in Albania. Blue dots are cultural sites, green are natural, and red are mixed.

The United Nations Educational, Scientific and Cultural Organization (UNESCO) World Heritage Sites are places of importance to cultural or natural heritage as described in the UNESCO World Heritage Convention, established in 1972. Cultural heritage consists of monuments (such as architectural works, monumental sculptures, or inscriptions), groups of buildings, and sites (including archaeological sites). Natural heritage consists of natural features (physical and biological formations), geological and physiographical formations (including habitats of threatened species of animals and plants), and natural sites which are important from the point of view of science, conservation, or natural beauty. Albania ratified the Convention Concerning the Protection of the World Cultural and Natural Heritage on 10 July 1989, making its historical sites eligible for inclusion on the list.

Albania has four World Heritage Sites and a further four sites on the tentative list. The first site in Albania to be added to the list was the ancient city of Butrint which was inscribed at the 16th UNESCO session in 1992. The historic centre of Gjirokastër was inscribed in 2005 as Museum-City of Gjirokastra. In 2008, the historic centre of Berat was added to the site, to form the Historic Centres of Berat and Gjirokastër. In 2017, the Gashi River and Rrajcë regions were listed as part of the Ancient and Primeval Beech Forests of the Carpathians and Other Regions of Europe that is shared with 17 other countries. In 2019, the site Natural and Cultural Heritage of the Ohrid region, a World Heritage Site in North Macedonia since 1979, was expanded to include the Albanian part of the coast. The site of Butrint was listed as endangered from 1997 to 2005 because of conservation issues.

== World Heritage Sites ==
UNESCO lists sites under ten criteria; each entry must meet at least one of the criteria. Criteria i through vi are cultural, and vii through x are natural.

* Transnational site

World Heritage Sites
Site	Image	Location (county)	Year listed	UNESCO data	Description
Butrint	Ruins of a Greek amphitheater	Vlorë	1992	570; iii (cultural)	Butrint (Latin: Buthrōtum) was an ancient Greek city, then a Roman one and the seat of a late Roman bishopric After a period of abandonment it was occupied by the Byzantines the Angevins and the Venetians. It was finally abandoned in the late Middle Ages. Prominent archeological sites include a Greek theater, a late-antique baptistery, a ninth-century basilica, and fortifications from the period of the Greek colony to the Middle Ages.
Historic Centres of Berat and Gjirokastër	Town with Ottoman-style houses and stone walls	Berat, Gjirokastër	2005	569; iii, iv (cultural)	Berat (pictured) and Gjirokastër are inscribed as rare examples of an architecture typical of the Ottoman period. Berat bears witness to the coexistence of various religious and cultural communities down the centuries. It features a castle, most of which was built in the 13th century, although its origins date back to the 4th century BC. The citadel area has many Byzantine churches, mainly from the 13th century, as well as several mosques built in the 15th century. Gjirokastër features a series of two-storey houses which were built in the 17th century. The town also retains a bazaar, an 18th-century mosque, and two churches of the same period. Gjirokastër was originally listed individually in 2005, Berat was added to the site in 2008.
Primeval Beech Forests of the Carpathians and Other Regions of Europe*	Mountain landscape with trees	Kukës, Elbasan	2017	1133ter; ix (natural)	This transnational site (shared among 18 European countries) encompasses the Gashi River (pictured) in Tropojë, northeastern Albania, and the ancient beech forests of Rrajcë in Perrenjas, in central Albania. They demonstrate the postglacial expansion process of such forests and exhibit the most complete and comprehensive ecological patterns and processes of pure and mixed stands of European beech across a variety of environmental conditions. The site was originally listed in 2007 and expanded three times, the forests in Albania were listed in 2017.
Natural and Cultural Heritage of the Ohrid Region*	Paleochristian mosaic with motifs including a vine and birds	Korçë	2019	99quater; i, iii, iv, vii (mixed)	Lake Ohrid is home to numerous endemic and relict freshwater species. The surroundings have been inhabited since prehistoric times and there are numerous monuments, including churches and monasteries from different periods, especially in the Byzantine style. The lake is shared between North Macedonia and Albania, the part in the former was listed independently in 1979 while the Albanian part was added in 2019. They include the ruins of the paleo-Christian church of Lin, that together with its floor mosaics (example pictured) reveal the presence of Christianity. The historical centre of Pogradec represents an example of 19th to 20th century Albanian vernacular architecture.

== Tentative list ==
In addition to the sites inscribed on the World Heritage list, member states can maintain a list of tentative sites that they may consider for nomination. Nominations for the World Heritage list are only accepted if the site was previously listed on the tentative list. As of 2021, Albania recorded four sites on its tentative list.

Tentative sites
Site	Image	Location (county)	Year listed	UNESCO criteria	Description
Amphitheatre of Durrës	Ruins of a Roman amphitheater	Durrës	1996	v (cultural)	The Roman amphitheatre of Durrës was the largest in the Balkans. The amphitheatre has an elliptical shape with the longest axis of 136 metres (446 ft) and it was 20 metres (66 ft) high. It had a capacity of up to 20 000 spectators. After the 4th century AD, the amphitheatre ceased to serve its purpose and was gradually abandoned. Systematic excavations on the site started in 1966.
Royal Tombs of Selca e Poshtme	Entrance to a tomb	Korçë	1996	iii (cultural)	The Illyrian tombs are located near the town of Pogradec near the village of Selcë e Poshtme. Most tombs were created in the 3rd century BC and were carved into the rock. Initially built for Illyrian kings, some of the tombs were later reused.
The Ancient City of Apollonia	Partially reconstructed ruins of a Greek temple	Fier	2014	ii, iii, x (mixed)	The city of Apollonia was probably founded in the 6th century BC by Greek colonists from Corfu and Corinth. The city flourished in the 4th century BC and was an important trade and economic centre, one of the most important cities of the Adriatic basin. During Roman times, it was one of the gateways to Via Egnatia. Throughout its existence, the culture and the general development of the city maintained a clear Greek character while keeping a close relationship with the Illyrian hinterland. The city was abandoned during the medieval period.
The Castle of Bashtova	An old castle with a keep	Tirana	2017	iv (cultural)	According to Ottoman sources, the castle was built by the Venetians to protect important routes. The Ottomans conquered it in 1478 and made further structural modifications. The castle had a rectangular plan, 60 metres (200 ft) x 90 metres (300 ft), and had three entrances. Two circular towers and one rectangular tower are still preserved today.

== See also ==
- Cultural heritage of Albania
- List of Intangible Cultural Heritage elements in Albania
- UNESCO Memory of the World Programme Lists
