= Amphitheatre of Durrës =

Ancient Roman amphitheater in Durrës, Albania

Coordinates: 41°18′44″N 19°26′42″E

- Amfiteatri i Durrësit (Albanian); Amphitheatrum Dyrrhachinum (Latin)
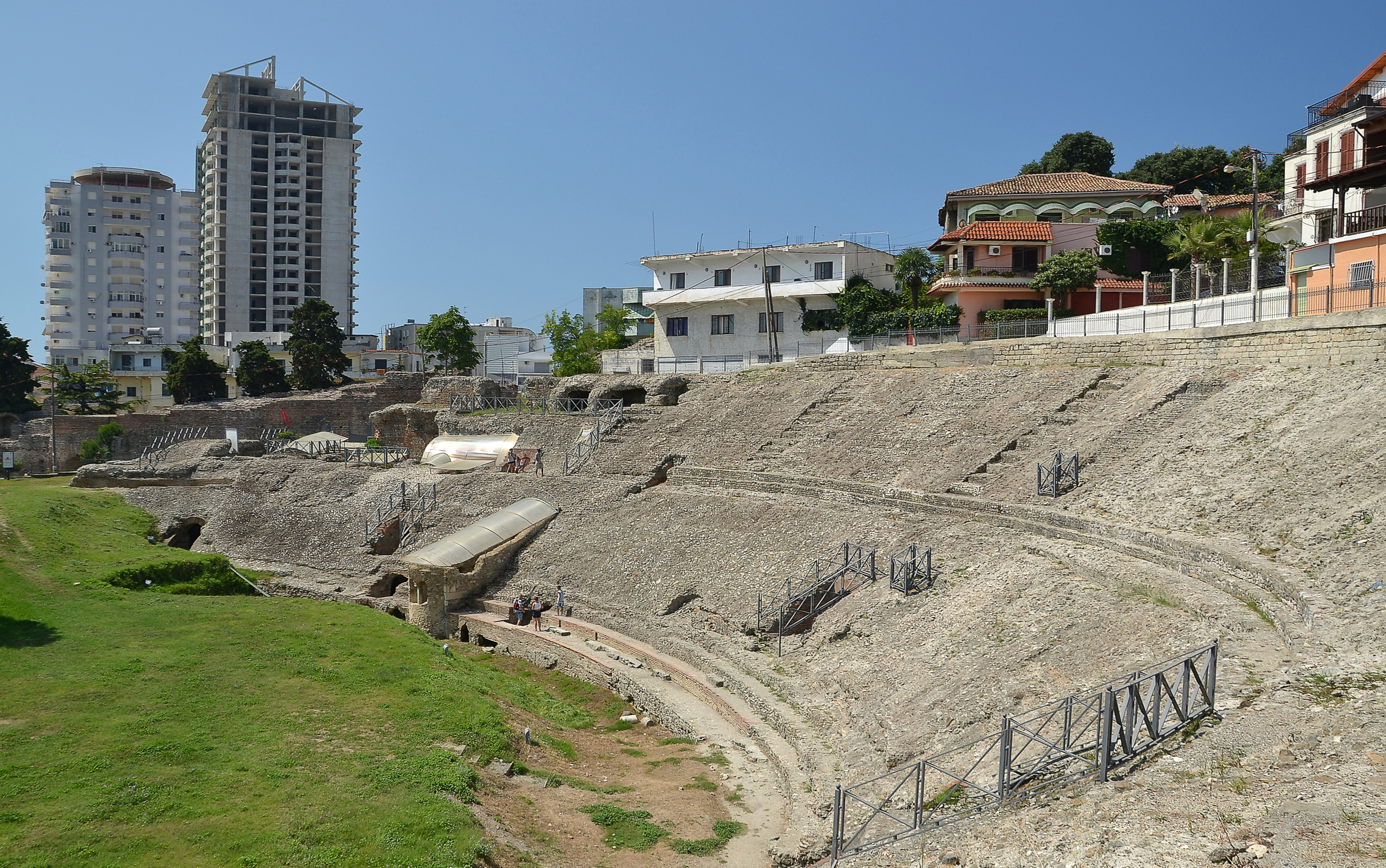
- Amphitheatre of Durrës

- Location in Albania
- Type: Roman amphitheatre
- Periods: Roman Empire
- Location: Durrës, Durrës County Albania
- Region: Illyria

History
- Built: 2nd century AD

Site notes
- Height: 20 metres (66 ft)
- Length: 132.4 metres (434 ft)
- Width: 113.2 metres (371 ft)
- Excavation dates: 1966
- Condition: ruins
- Public access: yes (admission fee)

The Amphitheatre of Durrës (Albanian: Amfiteatri i Durrësit; Latin: Amphitheatrum Dyrrhachinum) is a Roman amphitheatre in the centre of the city of Durrës, Albania. Construction began under the emperor Trajan in the 2nd century AD and it was destroyed twice by earthquakes in the 6th and 10th centuries. It is the largest Roman amphitheatre ever built in the Balkan Peninsula, once having a capacity of 20,000 people.

The amphitheatre is included on the tentative list of Albanian UNESCO World Heritage Sites. It was discovered in late 1966, and has since become a popular tourist attraction.

== History ==
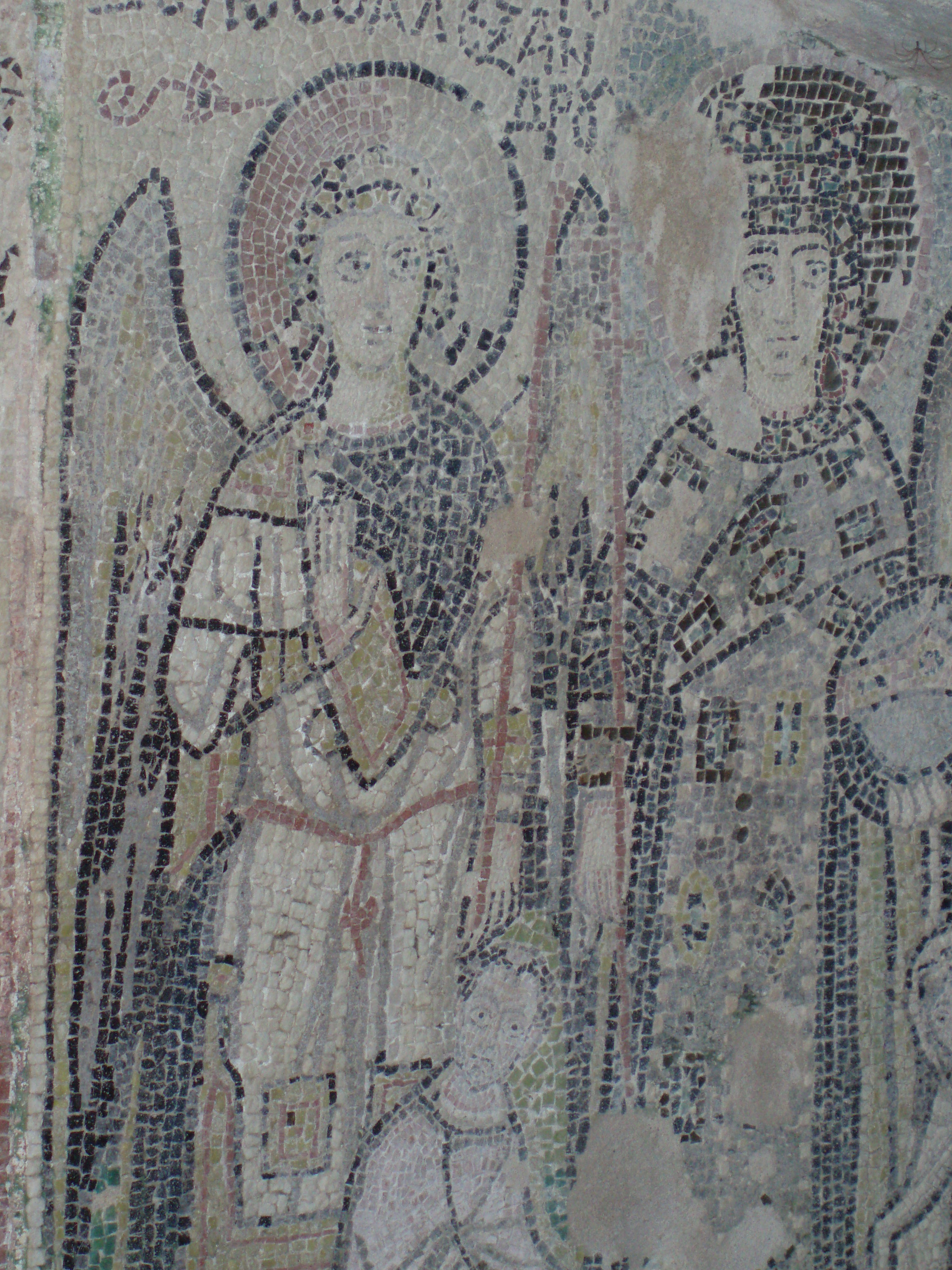
An Early Christian mosaic in the chapel

The amphitheatre was built in the beginning of the 2nd century AD, and was used for performances until the 4th century AD. The earthquake of 345/346 likely damaged the monument and closed the 'ludii gladiatorii'. An early Christian chapel was constructed on the amphitheatre in the second half of the 4th century. The chapel was initially decorated with frescoes; in the 6th century, mosaics were added. A medieval chapel was built in the 13th century, also decorated with frescoes. The amphitheatre was covered over in the 16th century, after the Ottoman occupation, when a wall was built nearby. Marin Barleti described the monument as 'well constructed'.

About one third of the site was discovered and excavated in the 1960s by Vangjel Toci; the rest was excavated in the 1980s by Lida Miraj. After excavation the amphitheater slowly deteriorated, as no conservation efforts were undertaken prior to the 2000s, and construction continued to take place around the site. In 2004, the University of Parma started restoration work to save the monument.

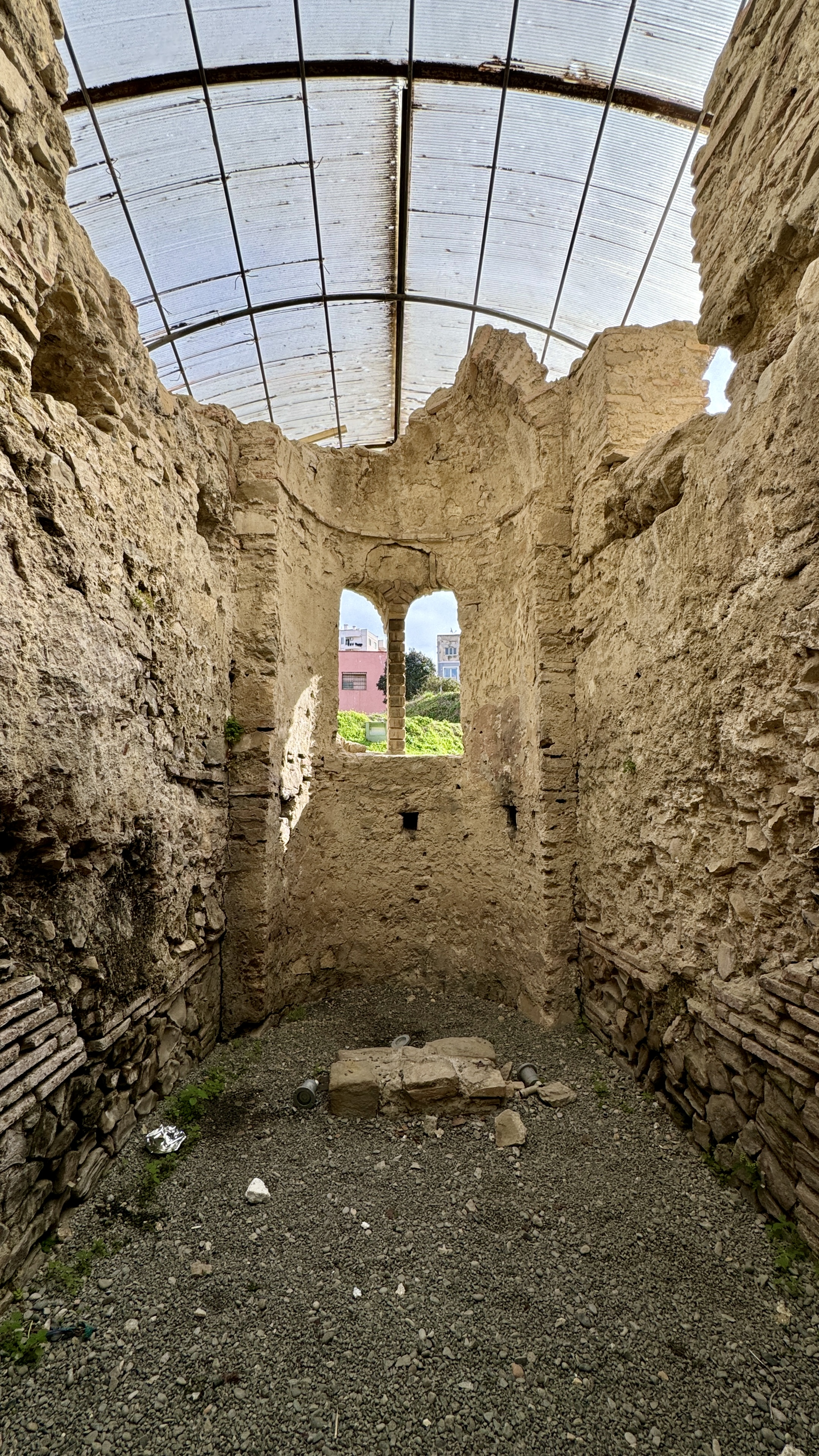
In the sixth century, this small apsed mortuary chapel was constructed in the defunct Amphitheatre of Durrës.

== Site ==
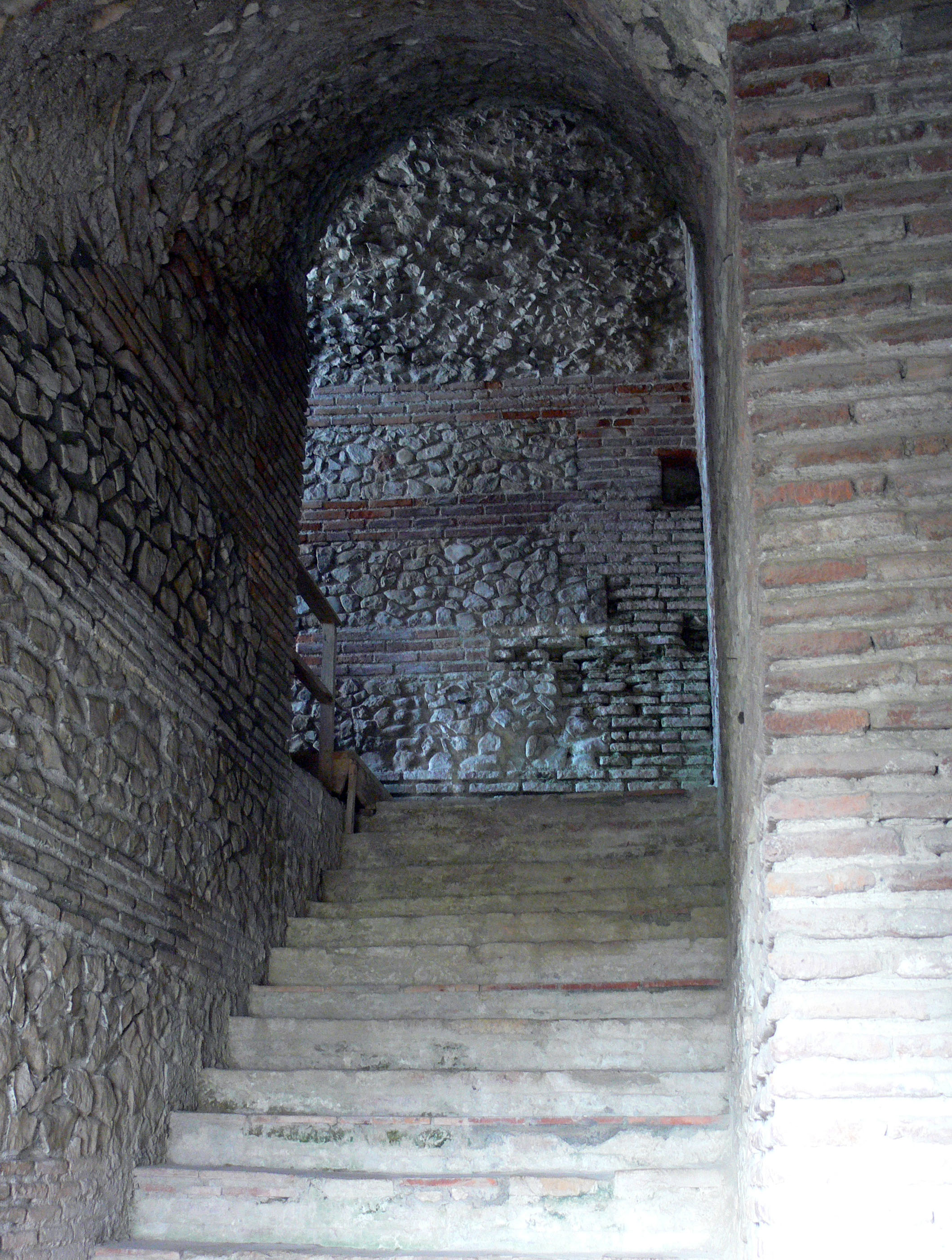
One of the amphitheater's stairwells

The amphitheatre has an elliptical shape with axes of 132.4 metres (434 ft) and 113.2 metres (371 ft). The arena is 61.4 metres (201 ft) by 42.2 metres (138 ft) and is 20 metres (66 ft) high. It is built on a sloping hillside, and inside the amphitheatre there are staircases and galleries at different levels. The chapel with mosaics is preserved.

The site currently functions as a museum and as the stage for the International Film Summerfest of Durrës.

== Dangers ==
The amphitheatre is surrounded on all sides by the city of Durrës, and a section of the arena itself has been built upon with modern housing. Thus, development pressures threaten the long-term preservation of the site. The municipality of Durrës is now planning to remove the houses.

The amphitheatre has serious structural deficiencies, and its mosaics and paintings are slowly decaying.

In 2013, the amphitheatre was shortlisted along with thirteen other sites by Europa Nostra as one of the most endangered cultural heritage sites in Europe.

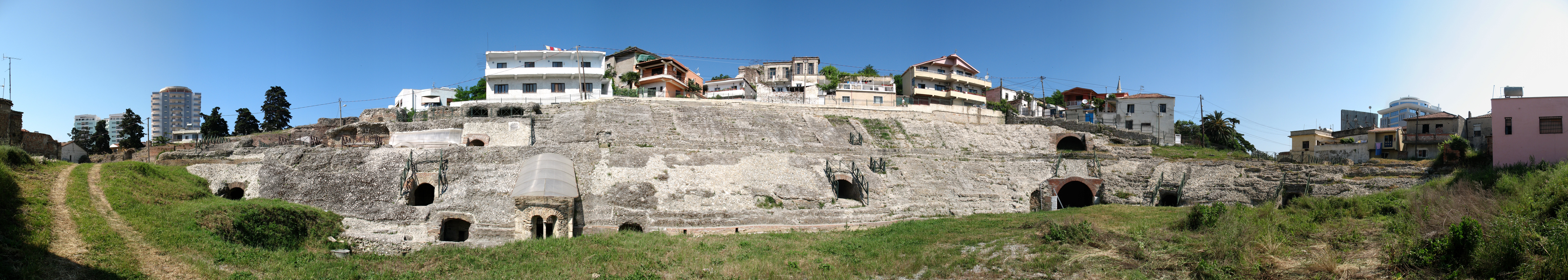
Panorama of Durrës Amphitheatre

== See also ==
- Architecture of Albania
- The Beauty of Durrës
- List of World Heritage Sites in Albania
- List of Roman amphitheatres
