= Maja e Thatë =

Mountain in Albania and Montenegro

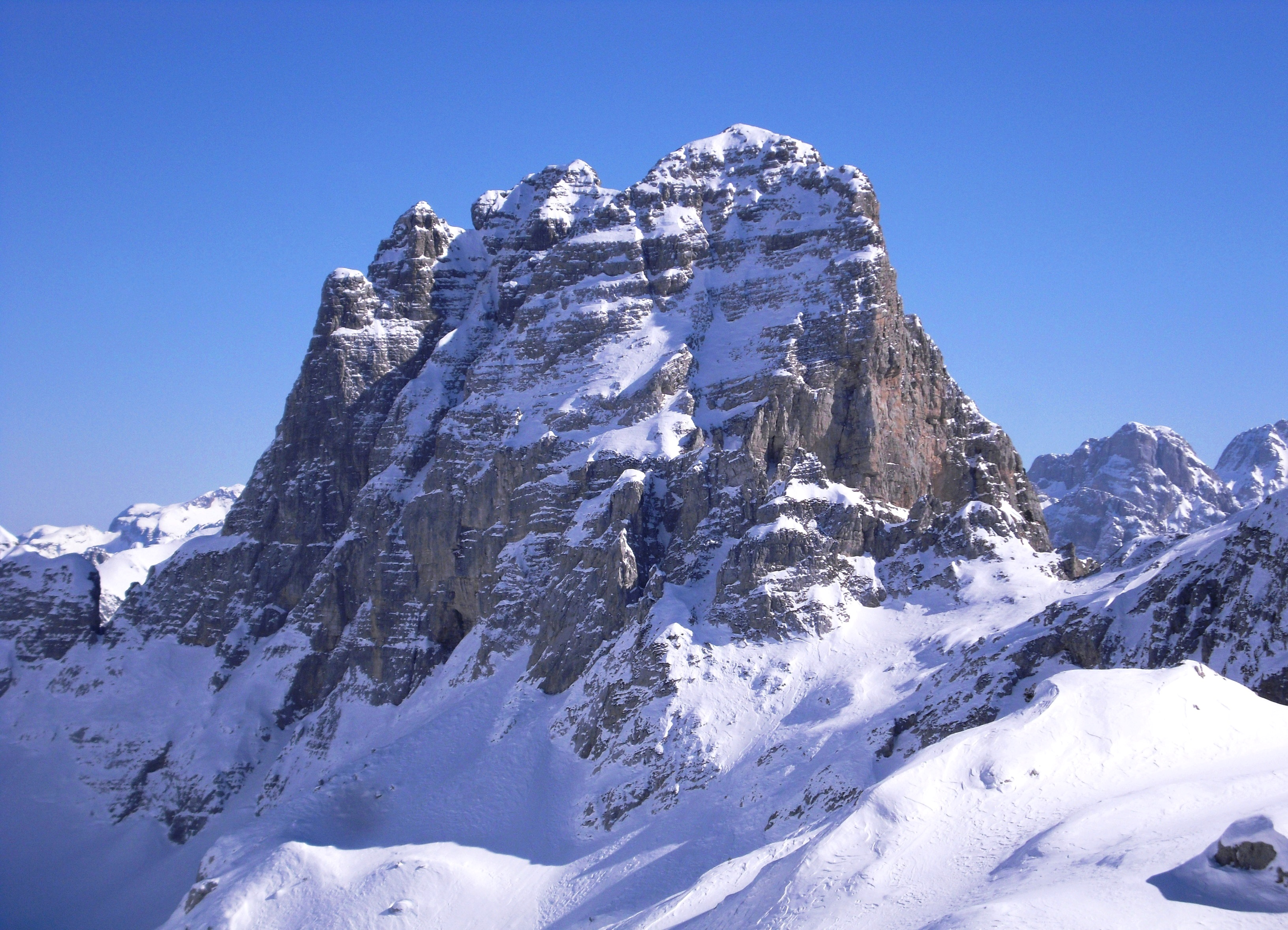
- Northwest view of Maja e Thatë from Rupa trough (Albanian: Lugu i Rupës)

Highest point
- Elevation: 2,406 m (7,894 ft)
- Coordinates: 42°28′06″N 19°52′08″E

Naming
- English translation: Dry peak
- Language of name: Albanian

Geography
- Location within Albania Location within Montenegro
- Location: Albania

Geology
- Rock age: Triassic
- Mountain type(s): dolomite, Limestone

Climbing
- Easiest route: Rock climbing

Maja e Thatë (lit. 'Dry Peak') is a 2,406-metre-high (7,894 ft) summit in the Accursed Mountains, in northern Albania. It is located within Alps of Albania National Park, roughly 2 km (1 mi) northwest of Valbonë and rises more than 1,500 m (4,921 ft) above the village. The mountain's southern and western lower slopes are relatively rich in beech and pine forests, while the higher slopes consist of very steep dolomite and limestone rock walls, suitable for mountaineering and rock climbing.

== Overview ==
Maja e Thatë has an elevation of 2,406 m (7,894 ft) and is located northwest of Valbonë village, in the district of Tropojë, Kukës county, in Albania. It lies within the massif of Kolata, in the eastern part of the Albanian Alps (Accursed Mountains) range. Maja e Thatë rises above the village of Valbonë by more than 1,500 m (4,921 ft), but being surrounded by higher peaks within its massif and because high-altitude mountain passes connect it with them, Maja e Thatë's topographic prominence is insignificant.

The mountain pass Qafa e Rupës (Qafa e Kuqe) at 2130 m elevation, northwest of Maja e Thatë, detaches it from Maja e Rosit (2524 m), while the tectonic-erosive mountain pass of Rrethi i Bardhë (Albanian: Qafa e Rrethit të Bardhë) in the east detaches Maja e Thatë from Maja e Lugut të Ujit (2482 m), which is part of Kolata block. Glacial activity north of the mountain has created several small cirques in its surrounding troughs (Albanian: Lug): Lugu i Rupës, which stretches along east-west direction and Lugu i Persllopit, northeast of the mountain, along SW-NE direction. The shortest trail connects its nearest village, Valbonë with Maja e Thatë through Lugu i Rupës. The mountain can be reached from Vusanje in Montenegro through the mountain pass of Persllopi (2039 m), which is part of the border between the two countries, which subsequently continues with Persllopi trough (Albanian: Lugu i Persllopit) west of Kollata mountain (2555 m) until the feet of the rocky northeastern face of Maja e Thatë. The peak seems insurmountable from the northeast owing to its very steep rocky faces, which start directly from the trough surface.

The summit is a sharp ridge, and its crest has jagged edges. Horizontal monoclines are visible through all the mountain's northern rocky face, giving it an imposing appearance. Maja e Thatë can be seen quite impressively from the highest peaks of Grykat e Hapëta – Zhaborre mountain range, running in southwest-northeast direction, south of the villages Rragam and Valbonë, as well as from Maja e Rosit.

== Geology ==
The whole territory of Albania lies on the assemblage of geological structures called Albanides, which are part of the Alpine orogenic belt. Albanian Alps are included in the External Albanides and form the Alps Zone, consisting of limestone monoclines, combined with smaller anticlines.

Carbonate rocks are the constituents of Kolata massif and Maja e Thatë, as a part of this massif, is entirely composed of Triassic dolomite and limestone formations. On the northern rocky face of Maja e Thatë mountain, monoclines are clearly visible from the level of the trough of Rupa, up to the very summit.

Ice and frost's erosive activity and the periglacial environment on the surface of Kolata massif have led to solifluction, reaching the eluvian stratum.

== Biodiversity ==
Biota is especially rich in the southern and southwestern part of the mountain, mostly favoured by the abundant water sources of Valbonë river and the stream of Kukaj.

The European black pine (Pinus nigra) and Bosnian pine (Pinus heldreichii, P. leucodermis) as well as beech (Fagus Sylvatica L.) are widely spread in the south and west of the mountain. The Norway spruce (Picea excelsa) is sparsely found in the lowest slopes and mostly in the valley of Valbona.

Because of the diversity of natural conditions, a rich variety of animals lives in the Alps region and in Maja e Thatë's area specifically. The most common animals are wolf, fox, the European hare (Lepus europaeus), squirrel, and chamois (Rupicapra rupicapra). Few specimens of the potentially endangered Eurasian lynx (Lynx lynx) still live in the central part of the Albanian Alps, while its hunting is prohibited by law.

Characteristic birds of this region are the chough (Pyrrhocorax graculus), the shore lark (Eremophila alpestris) and the water pipit (Anthus spinoletta). The most widespread species are the rock partridge (Alectoris graeca) and golden eagle, which is also Albania’s national animal.

The waters of Valbonë river are a notable habitat of trout.

== Attractions ==
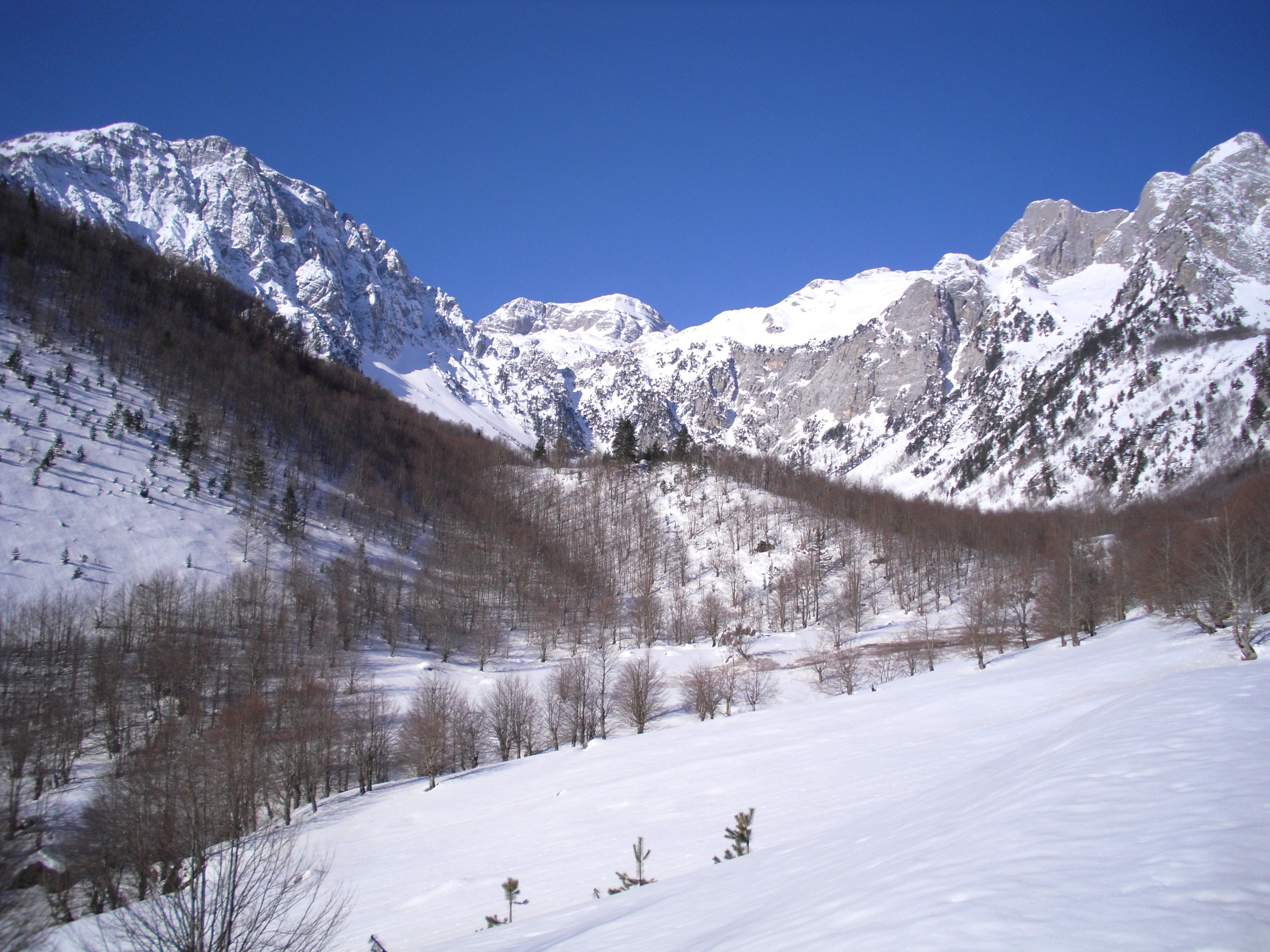
The hanging glacial valley of Kukaj and Maja Jezercë's round summit (2694 m) on the central background

Maja e Thatë has a well-distinguished peak and represents a tourist attraction for nature and mountain lovers, mountaineers and hikers in general. Apart for the mountain's aesthetic values, three natural monuments are located in its southern vicinity.

Cave of Haxhia

The Cave of Haxhia, a Nature Monument of Albania, is located on the southern slopes of Maja e Thatë, near Valbonë village, at 1,630 metres (5,350 ft) above sea level. Its length was previously affirmed as being 120 metres (390 ft) long, but in summer 2009, Polish speleo-expeditions explored 365 metres (1,198 ft) length of the cave. A very cold water spring of +5.4 °C (41.7 °F) was discovered inside it.

Hanging glacial valley of Kukaj

The hanging glacial valley of Kukaj (Albanian: Lugina e varur akullnajore e Kukajt) lies beneath the southwestern slopes of Maja e Thatë, surrounding the stream of Kukaj, (a tributary of Valbonë river) between the massif of Jezercë in the west and that of Kolata in the east. It is 2.7 kilometres (1.7 mi) long and covered by beech forest and European black pine. The valley is a Nature Monument of Albania.

Norway spruce of Valbona

Situated on the valley of Valbonë, between the villages of Rragam and Valbonë, the Norway spruce of Valbona (Albanian: Hormoqi i Valbonës), is the largest forest of its kind in Albania. It is declared a Nature Monument of Albania.

== Cultural works ==
Maja e Thatë and the Valley of Valbona are the subject of several paintings by the Albanian contemporary painter Pashk Përvathi. They are the central theme of his landscape oil painting Maja e Thatë, Valbonë (dimensions 80 centimetres (31 in) by 70 centimetres (28 in)) which was exhibited in Pristina, in the Art Gallery of Kosovo.

== See also ==
- Geography of Albania
- List of European ultra-prominent peaks
