= Shkëlzen =

Massif in Albania

- Mali i Shkëlzenit
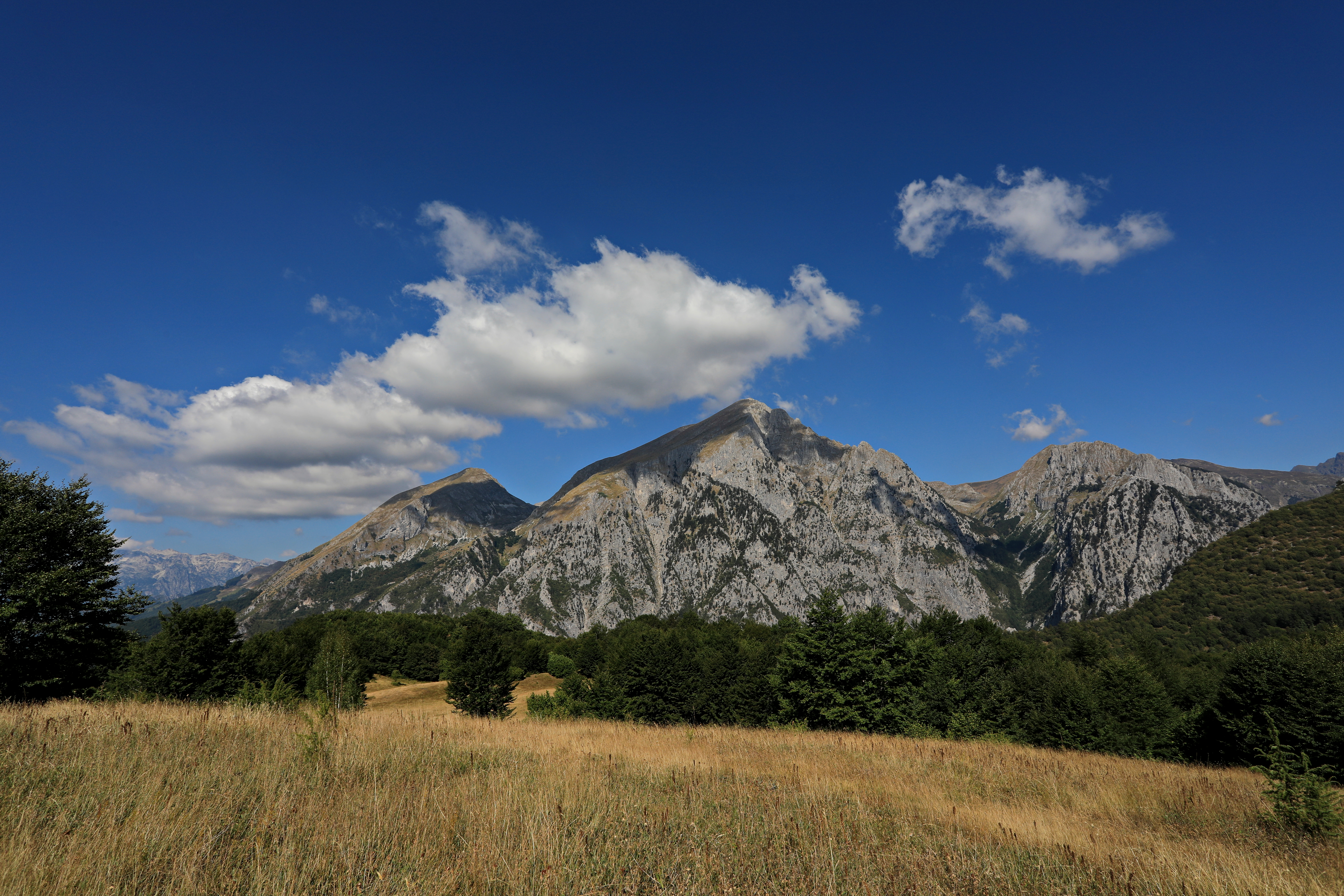
- View of Shkëlzen

Highest point
- Elevation: 2,407 m (7,897 ft)
- Prominence: 384 m (1,260 ft)
- Isolation: 6.9 km (4.3 mi)
- Coordinates: 42°27′24″N 20°07′43″E

Naming
- English translation: To shine

Geography
- Location within Albania
- Country: Albania
- Region: Albanian Alps
- Municipality: Tropojë

Geology
- Rock age: Mesozoic
- Mountain type: massif
- Rock type(s): limestone, dolomite, flysch

Shkëlzen (lit. 'To shine') is a massif situated in the Albanian Alps, bounded by the Tropojë river valley to the northeast, the Gashi river valley to the southwest and the Tropojë basin to the southeast. Its highest of the two peaks, Maja e Shkëlzenit, reaches a height of 2,407 m (7,897 ft).

== Geology ==
Composed primarily of Mesozoic limestone and dolomite, the mountain has an anticlinal structure, with a band of flysch emerging in the north and south. It forms a sharp ridge between the northeastern peak (Shkëlzen) and the southwestern peak of Radesha 2,314 m (7,592 ft), marked by steep slopes that descend sharply into the valleys. Two glacial troughs divide the mountain's summit and both peaks show distinctive pyramid-like shapes with sharp edges. Vegetation is scarce, with shrubs and pines found on its slopes.

== Climbing route ==
A hiking trail leads through hilly terrain into a valley located at the southeastern base of the mountain, a route that takes roughly three hours. From there, a steeper path ascends in about one and a half hours to the alpine pasture of Stani i Berdushit (1,700 m).

From this vantage point, the north face of the eastern summit is clearly visible, marked by two prominent rocky spurs that rise almost vertically toward the peak. Despite the steepness, the formation includes numerous ledges and protrusions.

The descent is generally considered easier via the western ridge, which then leads down the northern slopes toward lower elevations and back to the alpine pasture.

== Holy pilgrimage ==
On the main summit lies a sacred site known locally as the "Good Grave" (Albanian: Varri i mirë). The site is thought to be the burial place of one of the companions of Sarı Saltık, a legendary Sufi figure associated with the spread of Islam in the Balkans during the 13th century.

According to tradition, Sarı Saltık traveled from Anatolia across the Balkans and is said to have passed through the region of Tropojë. Mount Shkëlzen is believed by some to have been one of the places where he stayed during his journey.

== See also ==
- List of mountains in Albania
- Shkëlzen (given name)
