= Margegaj =

- Administrative unit
- Location within Albania
- Coordinates: 42°23′N 20°4′E
- Country: Albania
- County: Kukës
- Municipality: Tropojë

Population (2023)
  - Administrative unit: 1,907
- Time zone: UTC+1 (CET)
  - Summer (DST): UTC+2 (CEST)

Margegaj is a village and a former municipality in the Kukës County, northern Albania. At the 2015 local government reform it became a subdivision of the municipality Tropojë. The population at the 2023 census was 1,907.

The valley of the Valbonë River and the village of Valbonë are located in the municipality. The following settlements belong to the municipality:

- Bradoshnicë
- Çerem
- Dedaj
- Dragobi
- Fushë Lumi
- Koçanaj
- Margegaj
- Lagja Paqës
- Rragam
- Shoshan
- Valbonë

Margegaj may be etymologically related to the word Gheg, which would make sense since it is located in a Gheg region of Albania.

== Notable people ==
- Shpend Dragobia (1853–1918), warrior during the pre-Albanian declaration of independence period
- Haxhi Zeka (1832–1902), Albanian nationalist leader and a member of the League of Prizren
- Fatime Sokoli (1948–1987), folk music singer
