= Valbonë =

- Village
- Location within Albania
- Coordinates: 42.4533°N 19.8878°E
- Country: Albania
- County: Kukës
- Municipality: Tropojë
- Administrative unit: Margegaj
- Time zone: UTC+1 (CET)
  - Summer (DST): UTC+2 (CEST)

Valbonë (Albanian definite form: Valbona) is a village in the Kukës County, northern Albania. It is part of the former municipality Margegaj and situated in the valley of the river Valbonë, south of the mountain Maja e Thatë approximately 1,000 meters above sea level. Following the 2015 local government reform, it became part of the municipality of Tropojë. As one of the main settlements in Alps of Albania National Park, the village offers suitable accommodation for visitors and tourists, primarily in traditional alpine houses or inns (Albanian: hane). The village is situated about 25 miles (40 kilometers) north of Bajram Curri, with access passing through the historic village of Dragobi.

== Housing ==
The village of Valbonë consists of around 30 houses, most of which are traditional Albanian alpine dwellings. These are typically two- to three-storey stone towers with thick walls and roofs made of wooden boards, characteristic of the northern mountainous regions.

== Natural features ==
Alps of Albania National Park covers an area of approximately 80,000 hectares and is one of the most remarkable natural landscapes in the Albanian Alps. The Valbonë River, known for its crystal-clear waters, runs through the valley, originating from alpine springs and fed by tributaries such as the Rragam Waterfall. The waterfall is located near the village of Rragam, from which it takes its name.

Dense forests line the route to Valbonë, including areas near the Bajram Curri Cave, which is located shortly after passing Dragobi.

== Tourism ==
Valbonë Valley is one of the most visited tourist destinations in the Tropojë region, and ranks among the most popular in the Albanian Alps, second only to Theth Valley. It attracts both domestic and international visitors who are drawn to its dramatic alpine scenery, hiking trails, and opportunities to explore the traditions of the northern Albanian highlands.

The journey from Tirana, the capital city, to Valbonë typically takes around five hours. Many travelers choose to include a scenic ferry ride across Lake Koman, considered one of the most picturesque lake journeys in Europe.

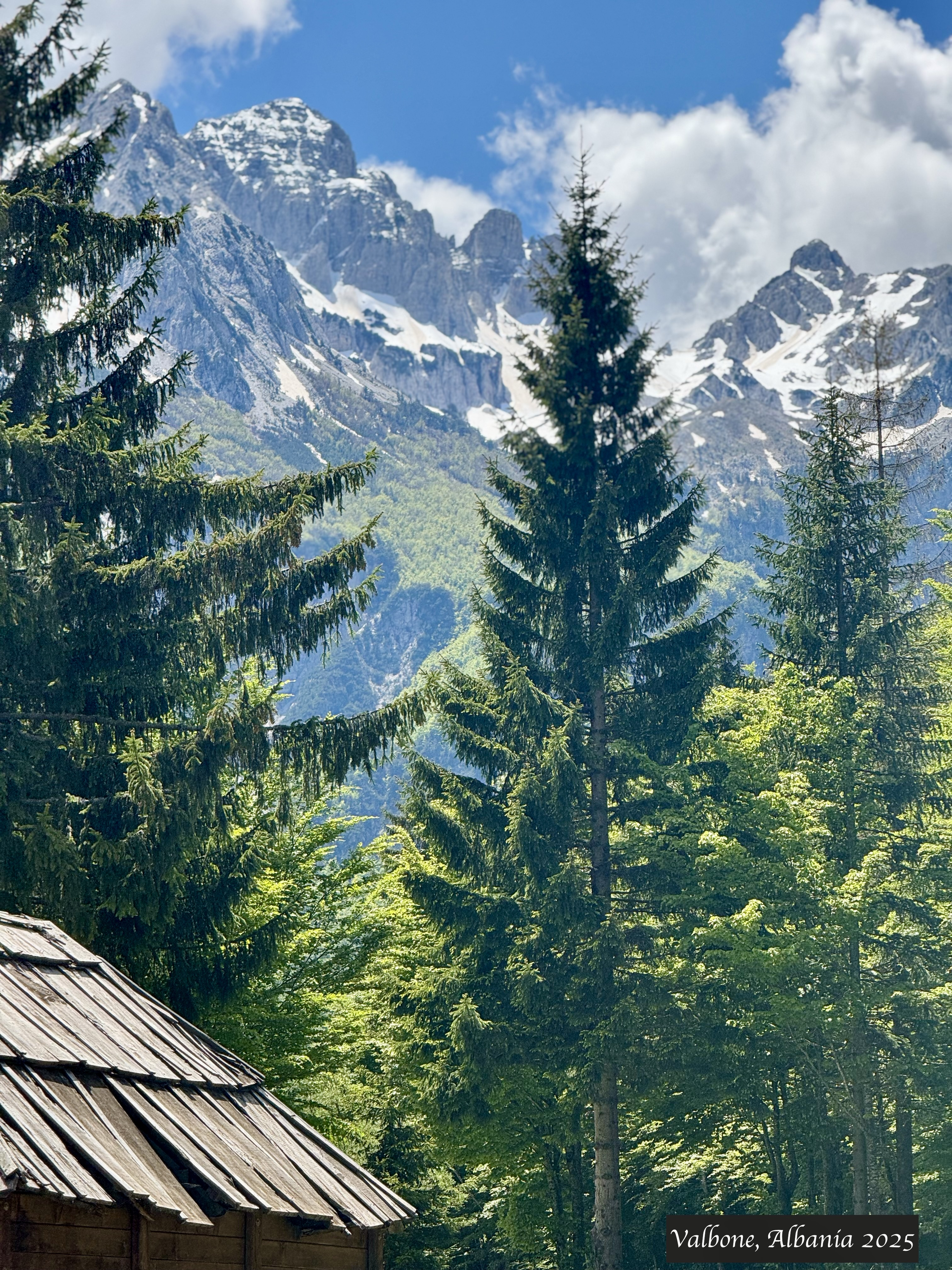

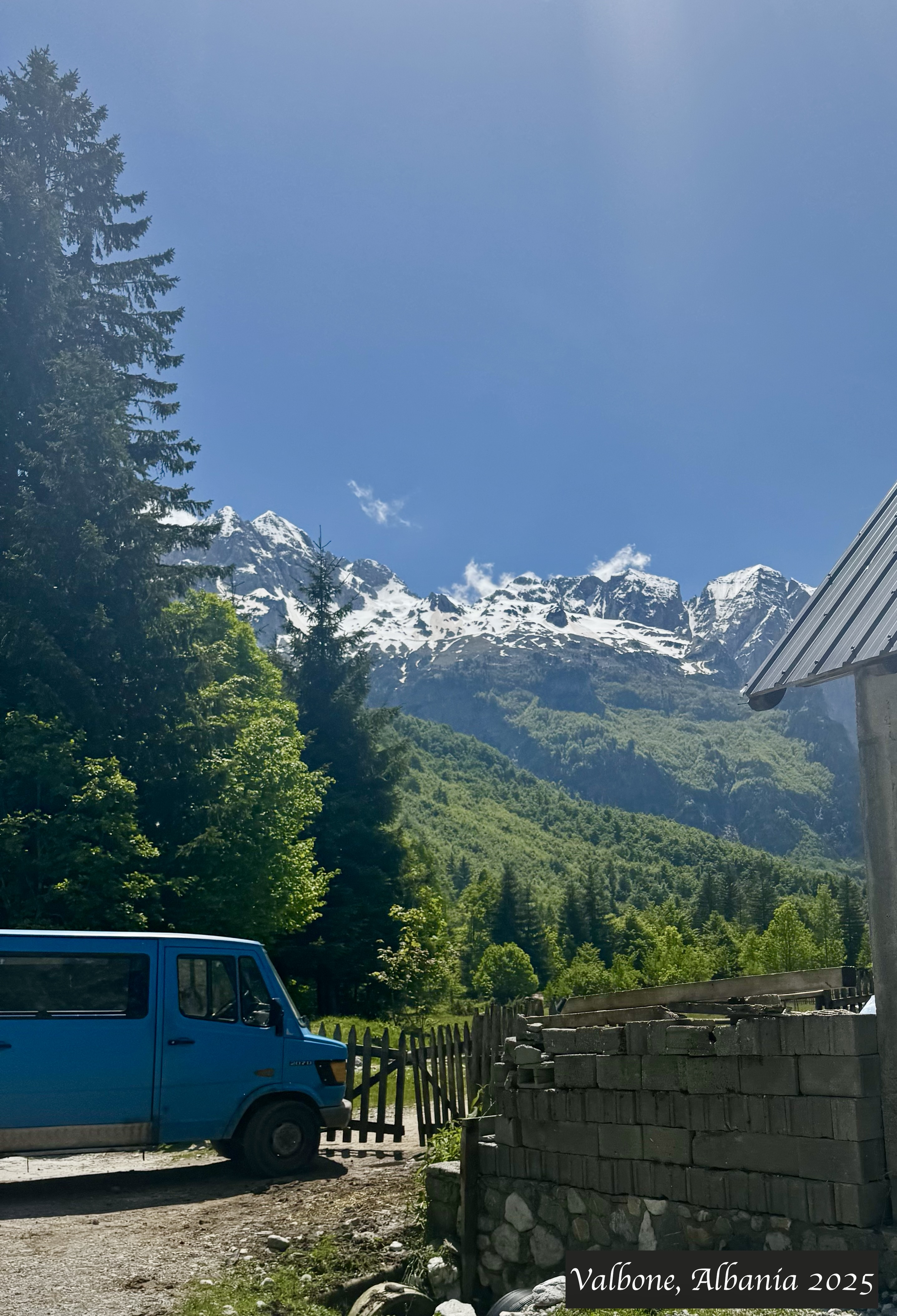

== Gallery ==
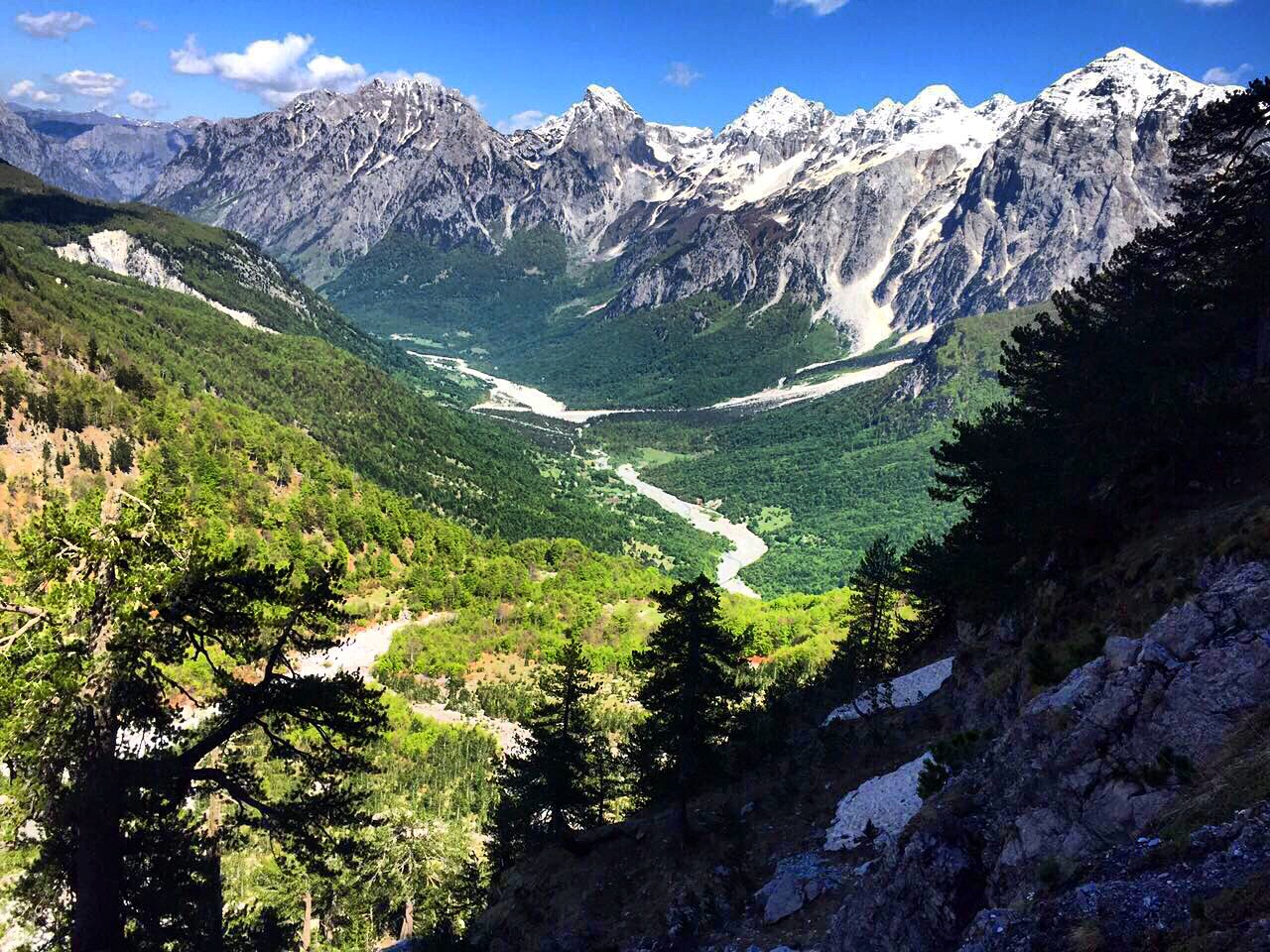

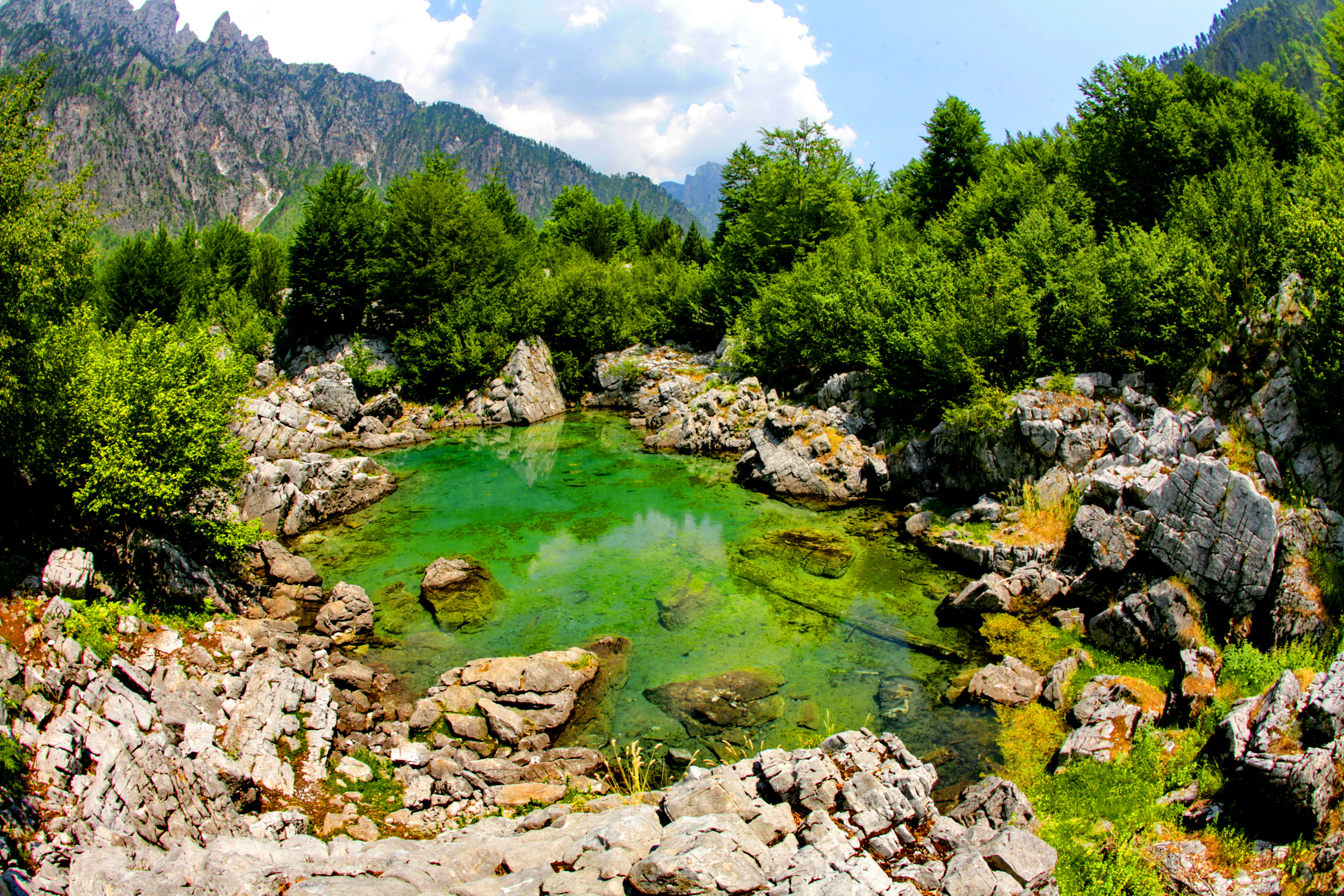

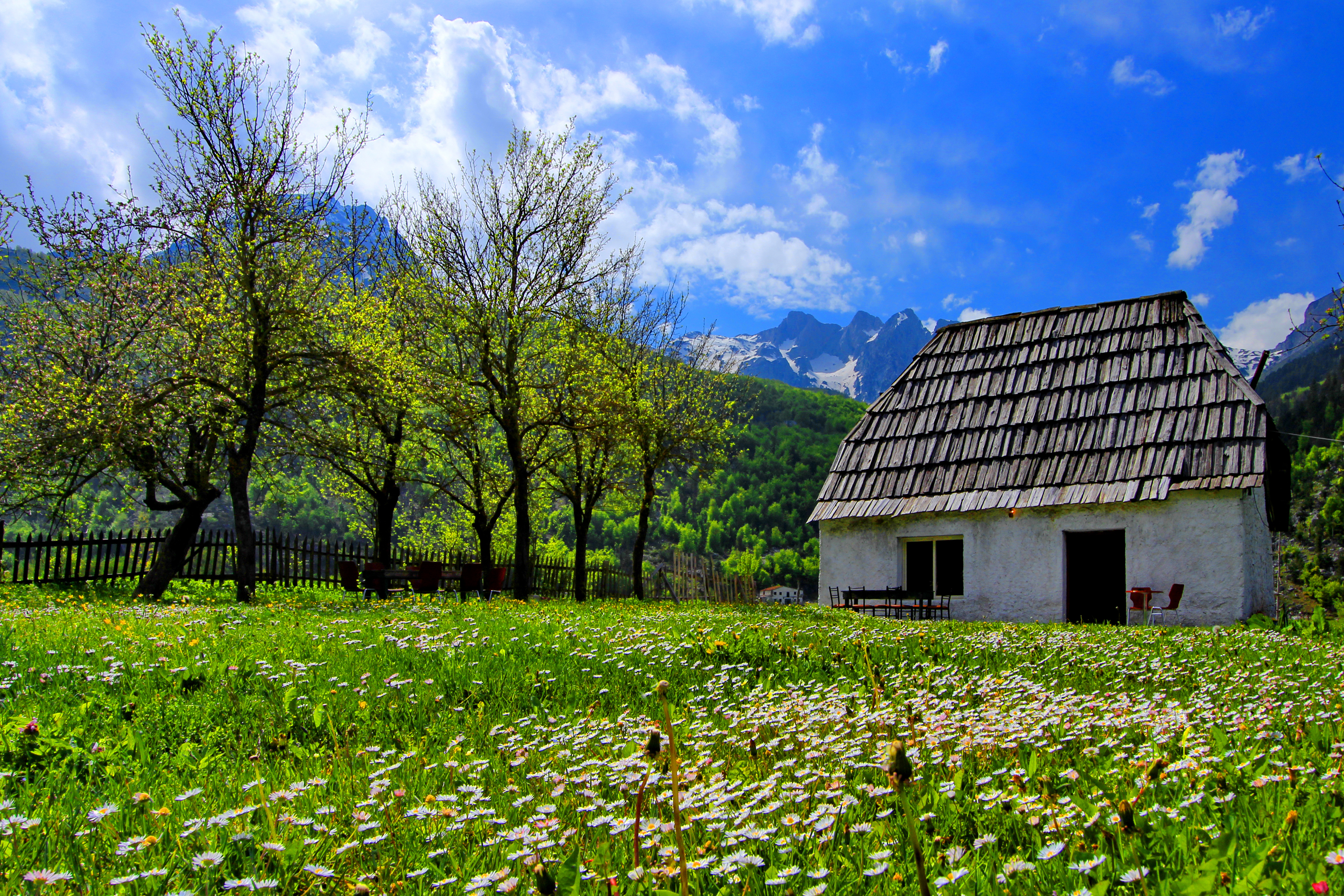

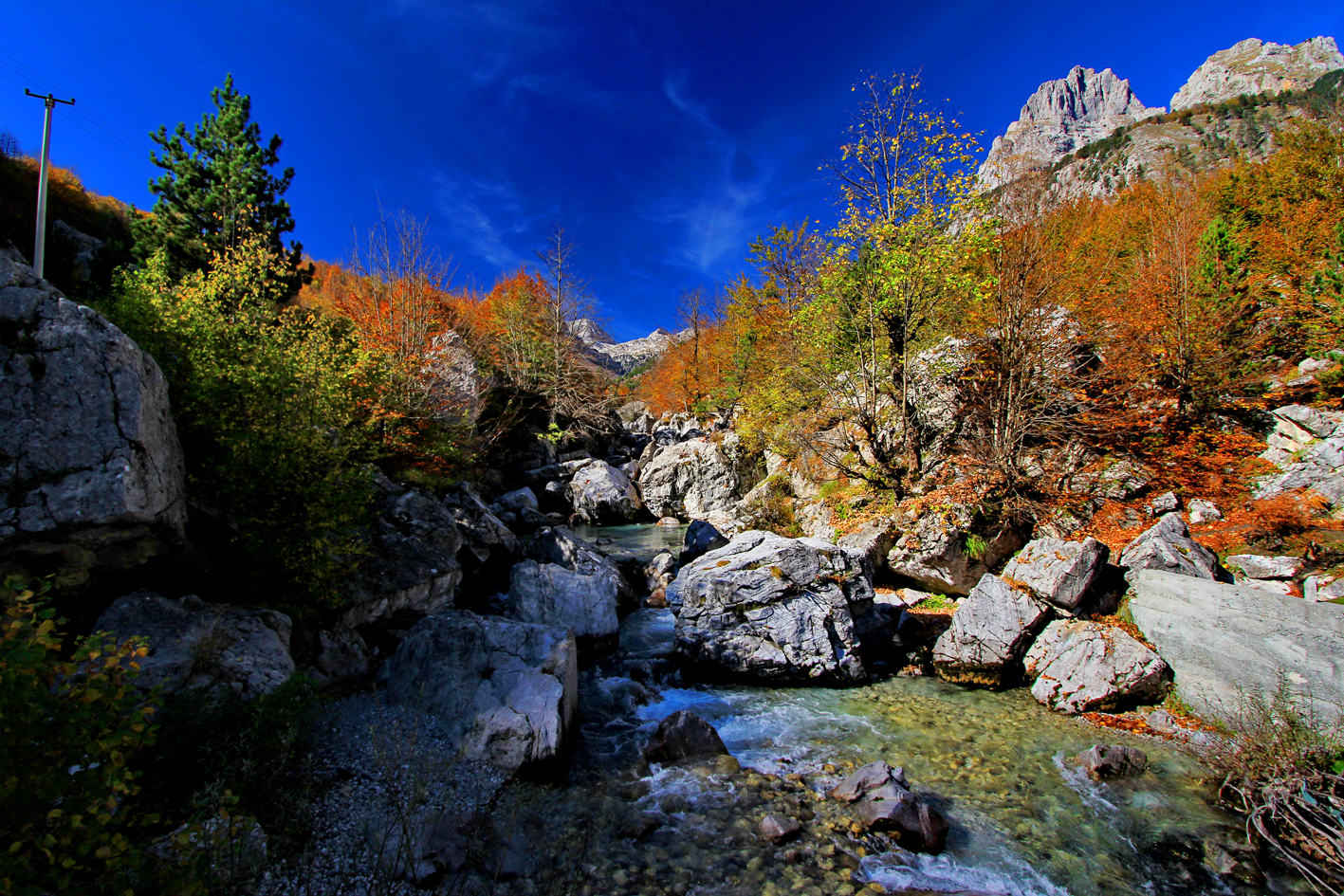

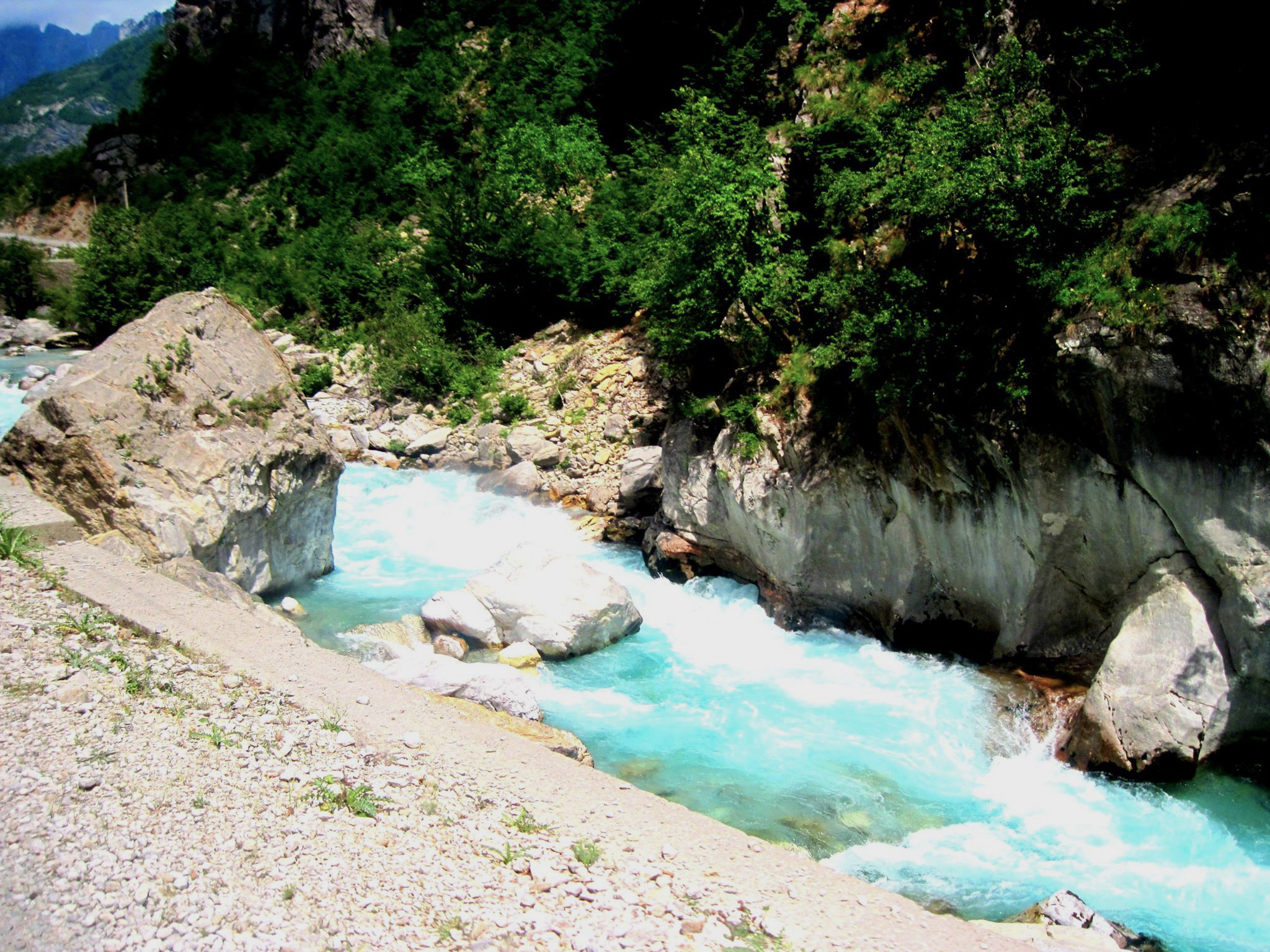

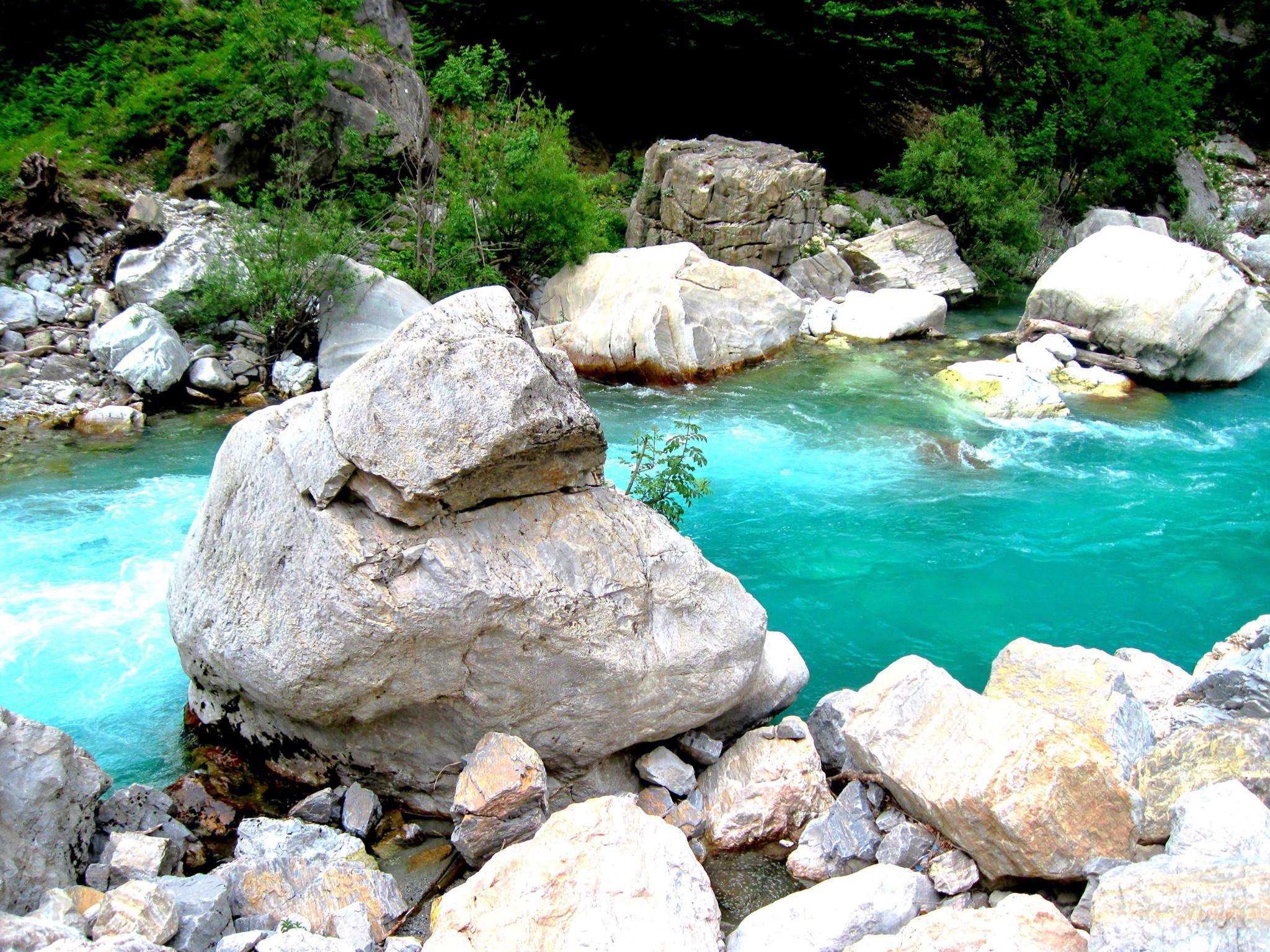

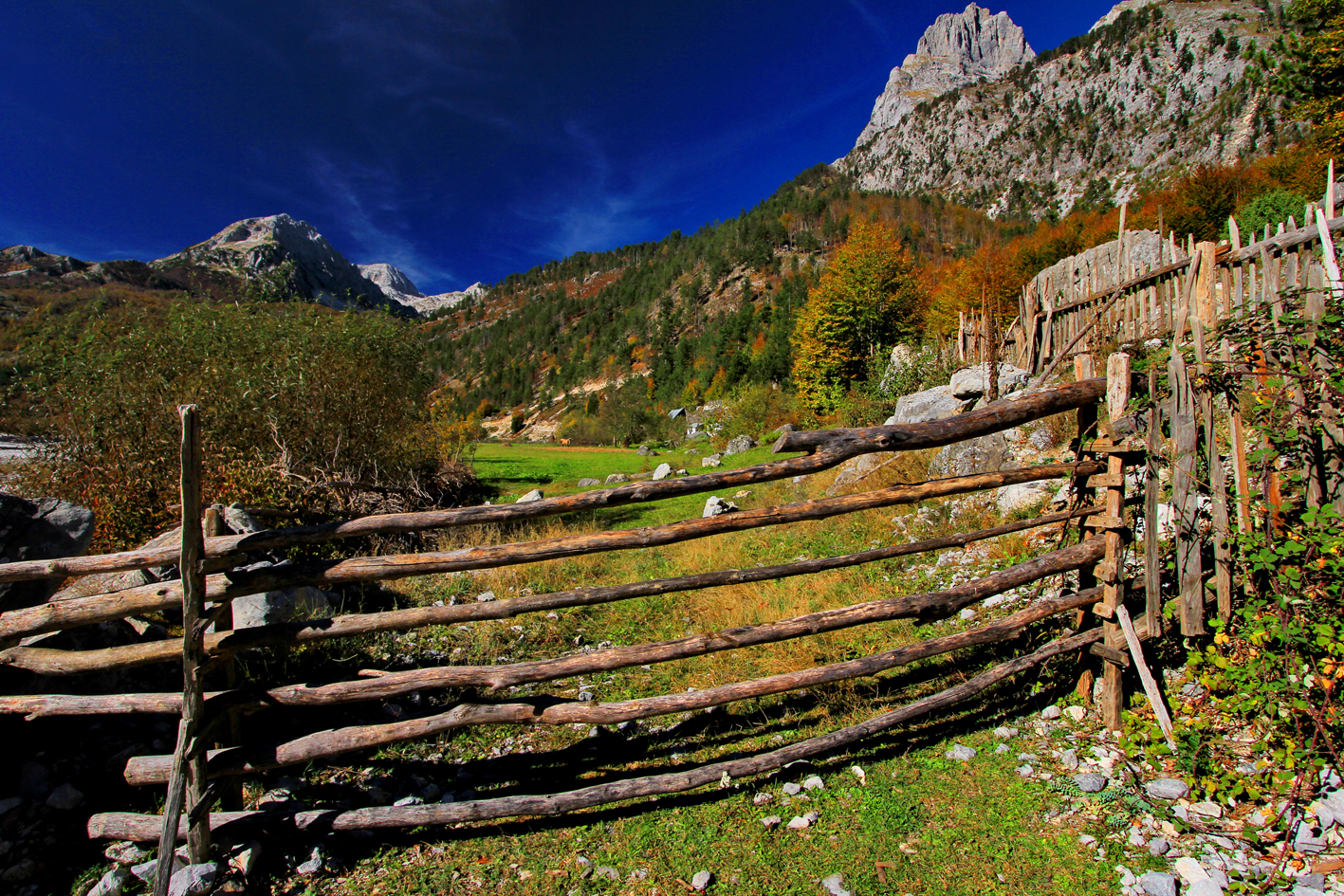

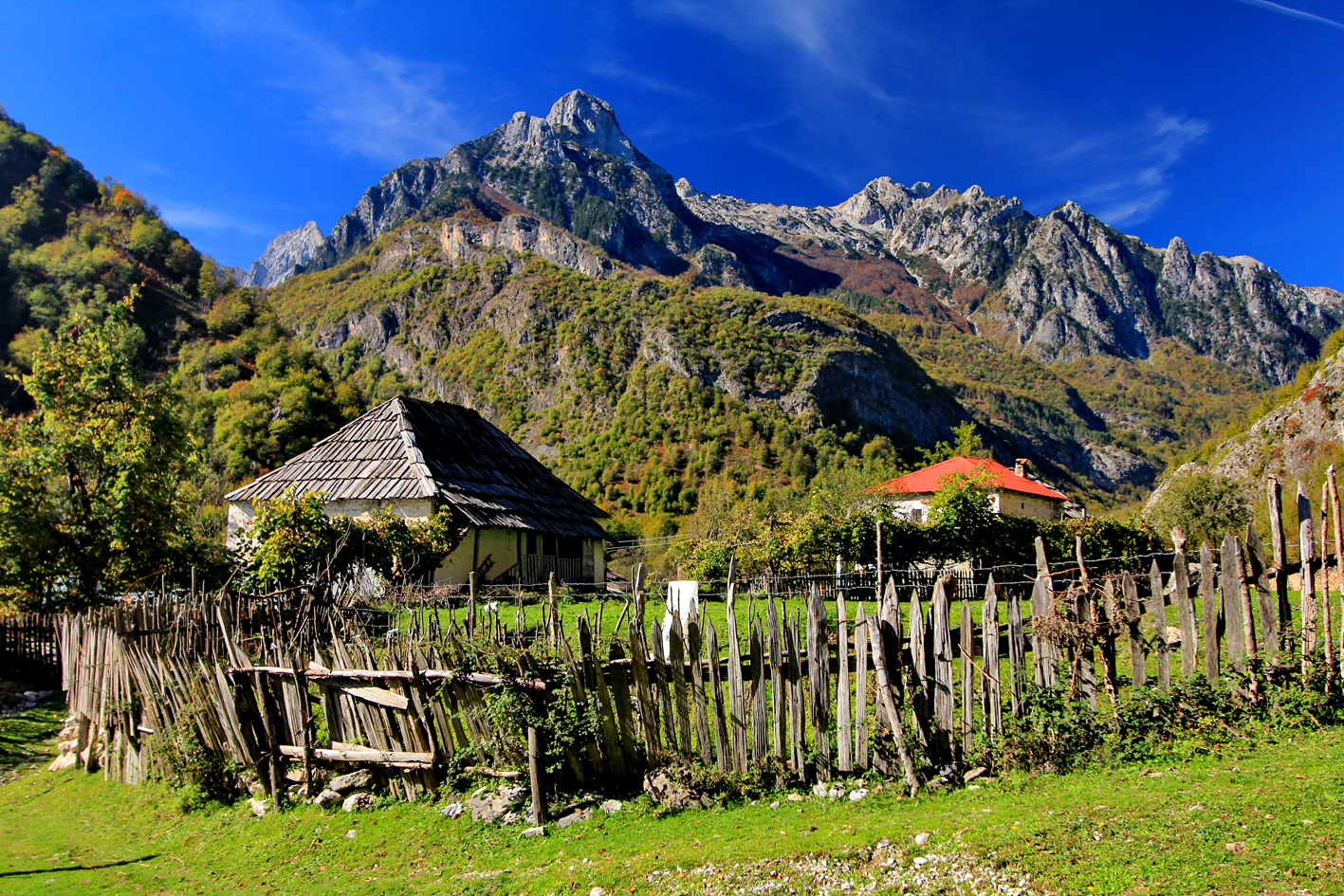

== See also ==
- Geography of Albania
- Tourism in Albania
