= Shkëlzen Baftiari =

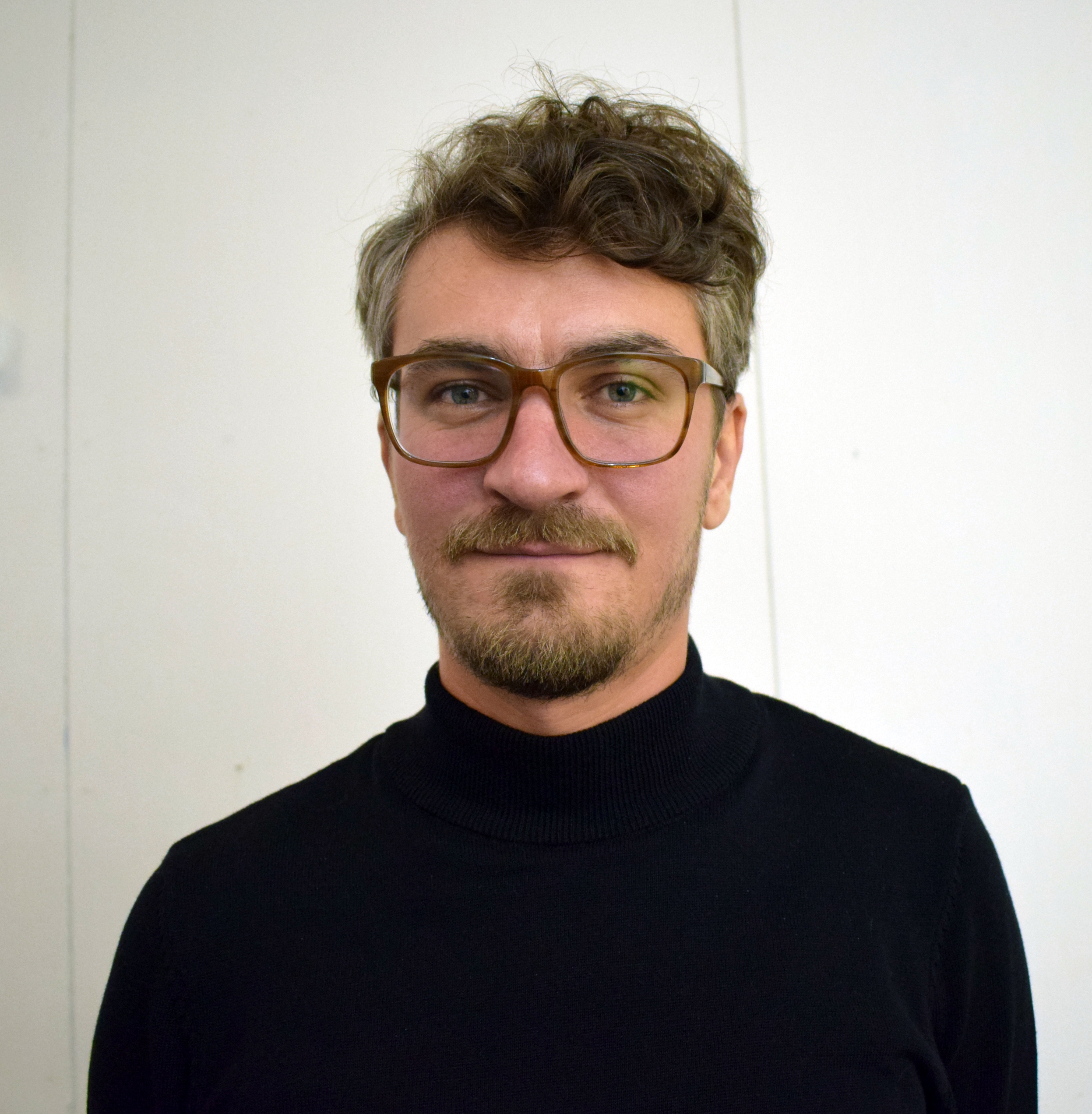
- Shkëlzen Baftiari at Autumnal Music Festival in Skopje, 2017

Background information
- Born: 1986 (age 38–39); Tetovo, Macedonia, Yugoslavia
- Occupations: Pianist, professor
- Instrument: Piano

Shkëlzen Baftiari (born at 1986, in Tetovo) is an Albanian pianist and professor from Republic of Macedonia.

== Career ==
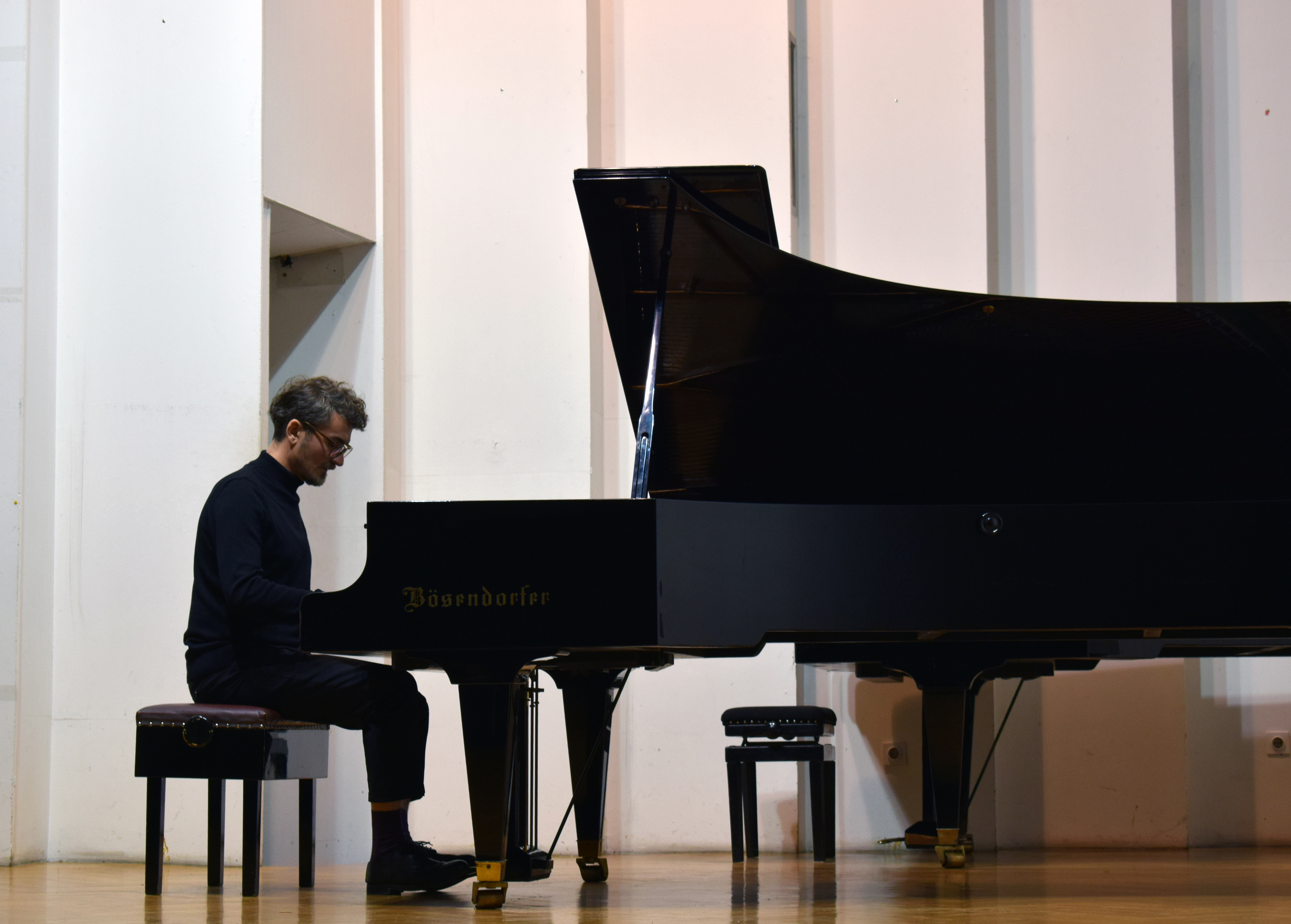
Shkëlzen Baftiari performing in Autumnal Musical Festivities in Skopje (2017)

Baftiari has participated in many concerts in Macedonia and abroad. In addition, he is also the winner of many national and international competitions. Some of them include: First Prize in Blagoevgrad (Bulgaria), Laureates at the Valentino Bucchi International Competition in Rome, Second Prize at the Nikolai Rubinstein International Competition in Paris, First prize at the Schumann-Brahms International Competition in Plovdiv (Bulgaria). In April 2007 he was the winner of the Special First Prize at The Republic of Macedonia Competition on Piano.

He has given recitals in Skopje, Pristina, Tirana, Sofia, Belgrade, Tetovo, Ohrid (Ohrid Summer Festival) and has performed as a soloist with Macedonian Philharmonic Orchestra and with the Symphonic Orchestra of the Faculty of Musical Arts in Skopje.

== Awards ==
In 2015, Baftiari was awarded with "Milingona e Artë" - Achievement of the Year in the Performing Arts of Serious Music.
