= Bogiçaj =

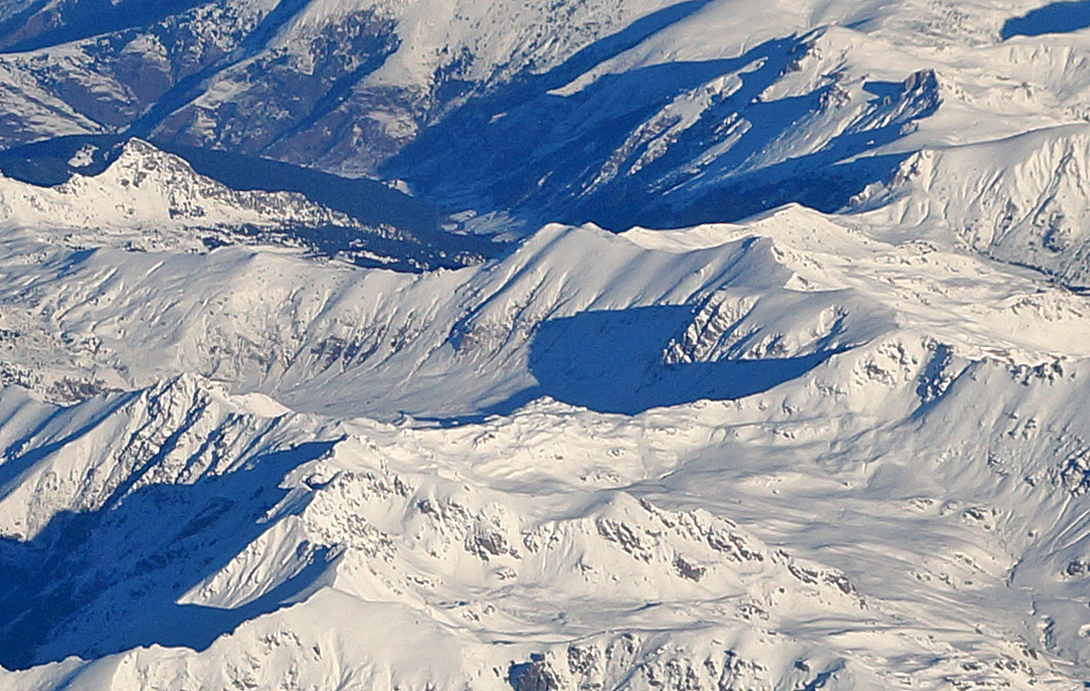

Highest point
- Elevation: 2,405 m (7,890 ft)
- Coordinates: 42°33′06″N 20°05′15″E

Geography
- Location within Kosovo Location within Albania Location within Montenegro
- Parent range: Albanian Alps

Geology
- Mountain type: Limestone

Bogiçaj (Montenegrin: Bogićaj) is a peak of the Accursed Mountains range. It is located on the border of Kosovo and Albania. Bogiçaj is part of the Accursed Mountains range and its peak is 2,405 m (7,890 ft) above sea level. One of the closest peaks is Trekufiri which is just found north-west of Bogiçaj peak.
