= Valbona (river) =

River in Albania

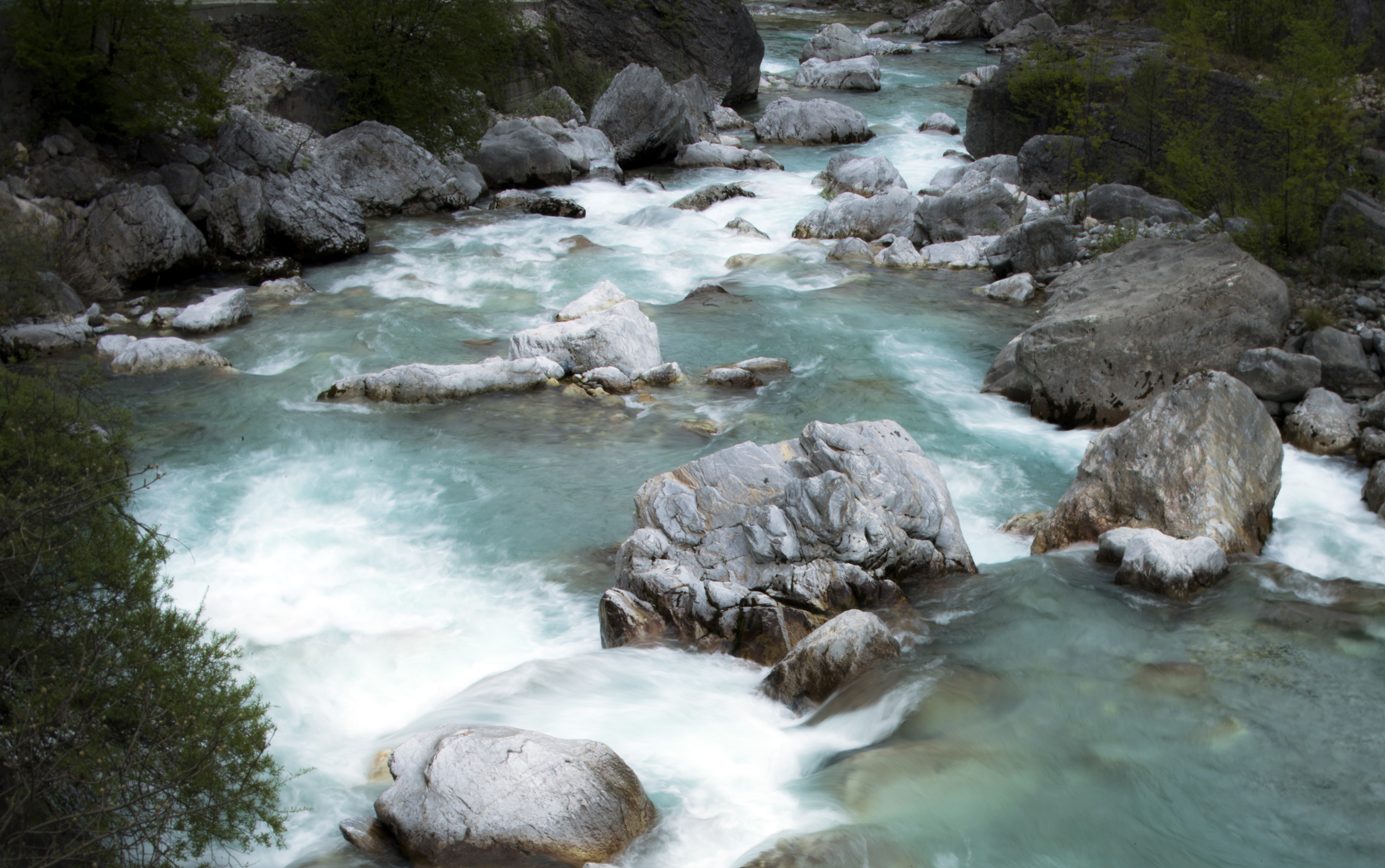
- Valbona river

Location
- Country: Albania

Physical characteristics
- Source: Albanian Alps
  - coordinates: 42.411°N 19.878°E
- Mouth
  - location: Lake Koman
  - coordinates: 42.267°N 20.023°E
- Length: 50.6 km (31.4 mi)
- Basin size: 657 km^{2} (254 sq mi)

Basin features
- Progression: Drin→ Adriatic Sea

The Valbona (Albanian indefinite form: Valbonë) is a river in northern Albania. It is still relatively untouched. Its source is in the Accursed Mountains, near the border with Montenegro.

The Valbonë flows generally east through the municipality Margegaj (mountain villages Valbonë, Dragobi and Shoshan), then turns south along Bajram Curri, and continues southwest until its outflow into the river Drin, near Fierzë. It is one of the cleanest rivers in the country. The river begins in and flows through the Valbonë valley.

== Hydropower Debate ==
Due to the Valbona's importance as a natural feature inside the Valbona Valley National Park, there has been much debate as to whether to allow hydropower plants to be constructed on it. From 2007-2013, the government granted contracts for the construction of six hydropower plants on the river. However, when construction started in 2014, residents reported never approving of the project and began raising concerns to the developer, Gener2.

When approached, Gener2 reported that they had collected signatures at a town hall meeting in 2013. These signatures we then disputed, with one accusation being that some of the signatures were from those who were deceased. When the case was closed in 2018, these accusations were dropped.

In 2016, The Organization to Conserve the Albanian Alps (TOKA) was founded to raise awareness about the hydropower projects and ideally halt their construction while promoting tourism of Albania's natural spaces. Through pressure from TOKA and the public, in 2021 the Supreme Court made the decision to suspend all works and the concession contracts for hydropower plants on the Valbona River.

== Gallery ==
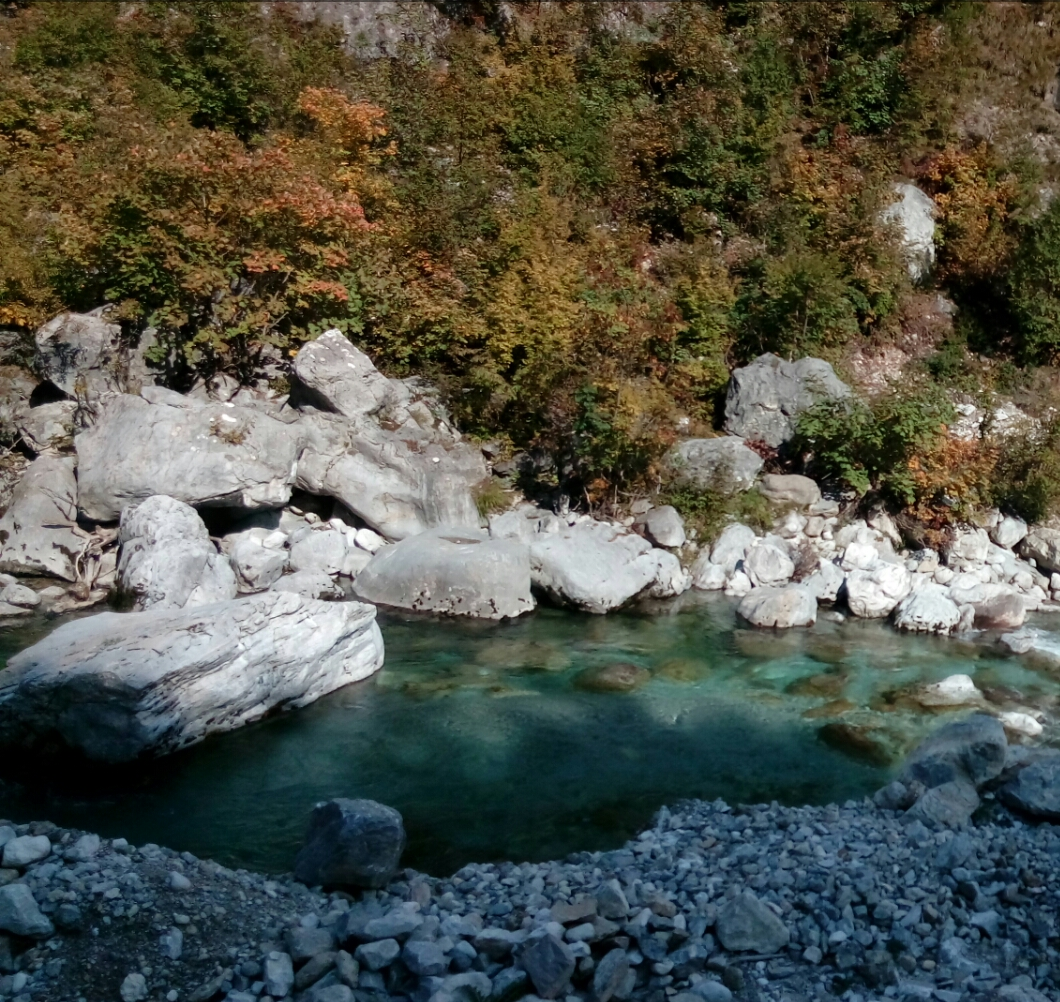

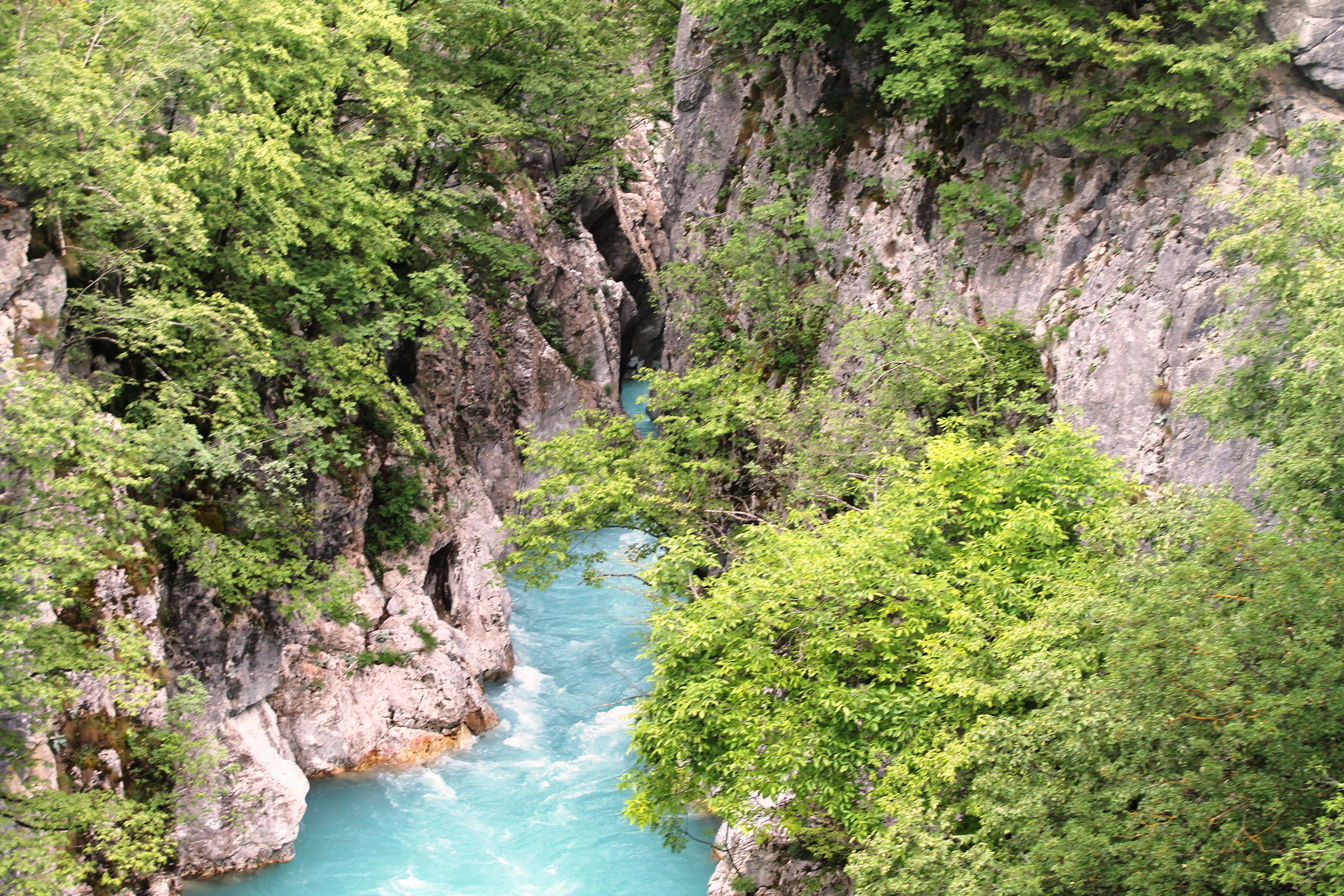

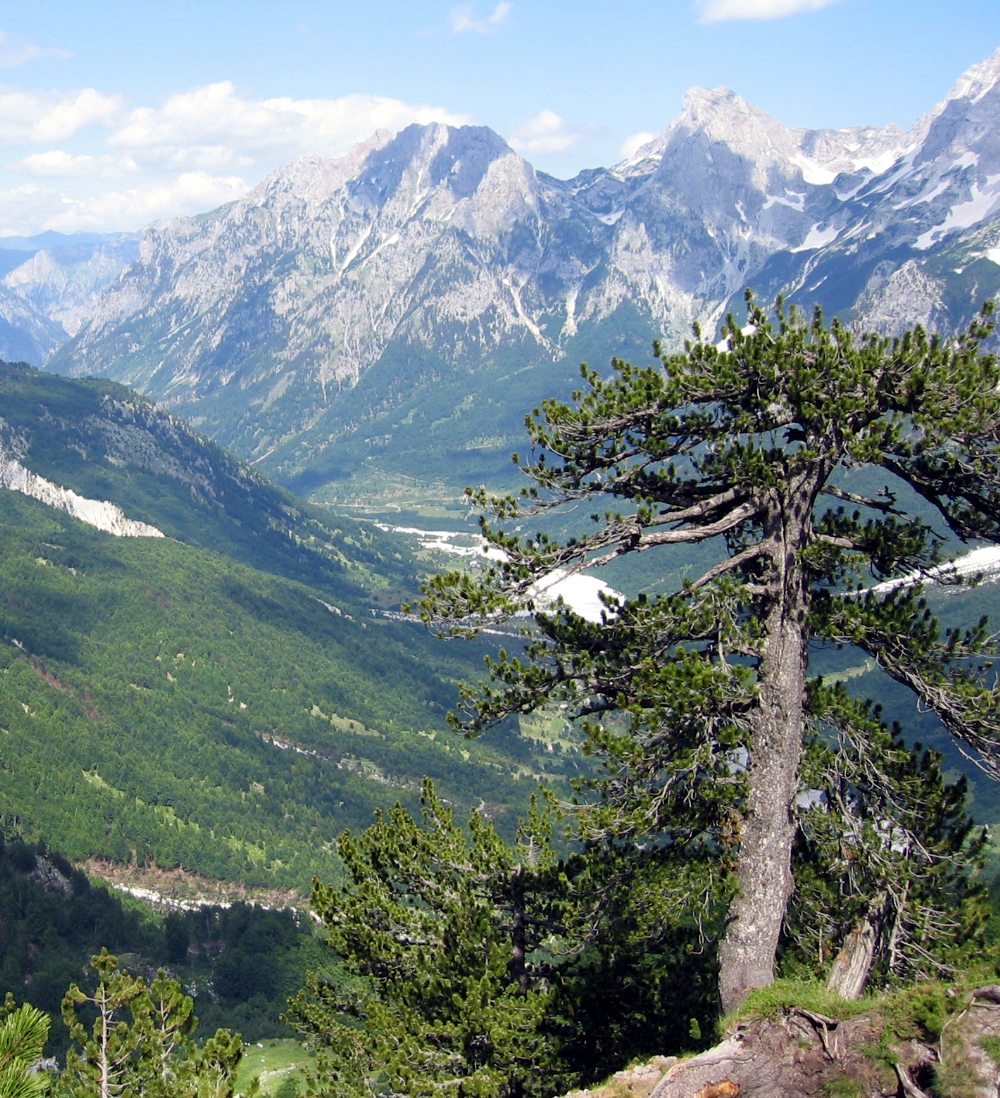

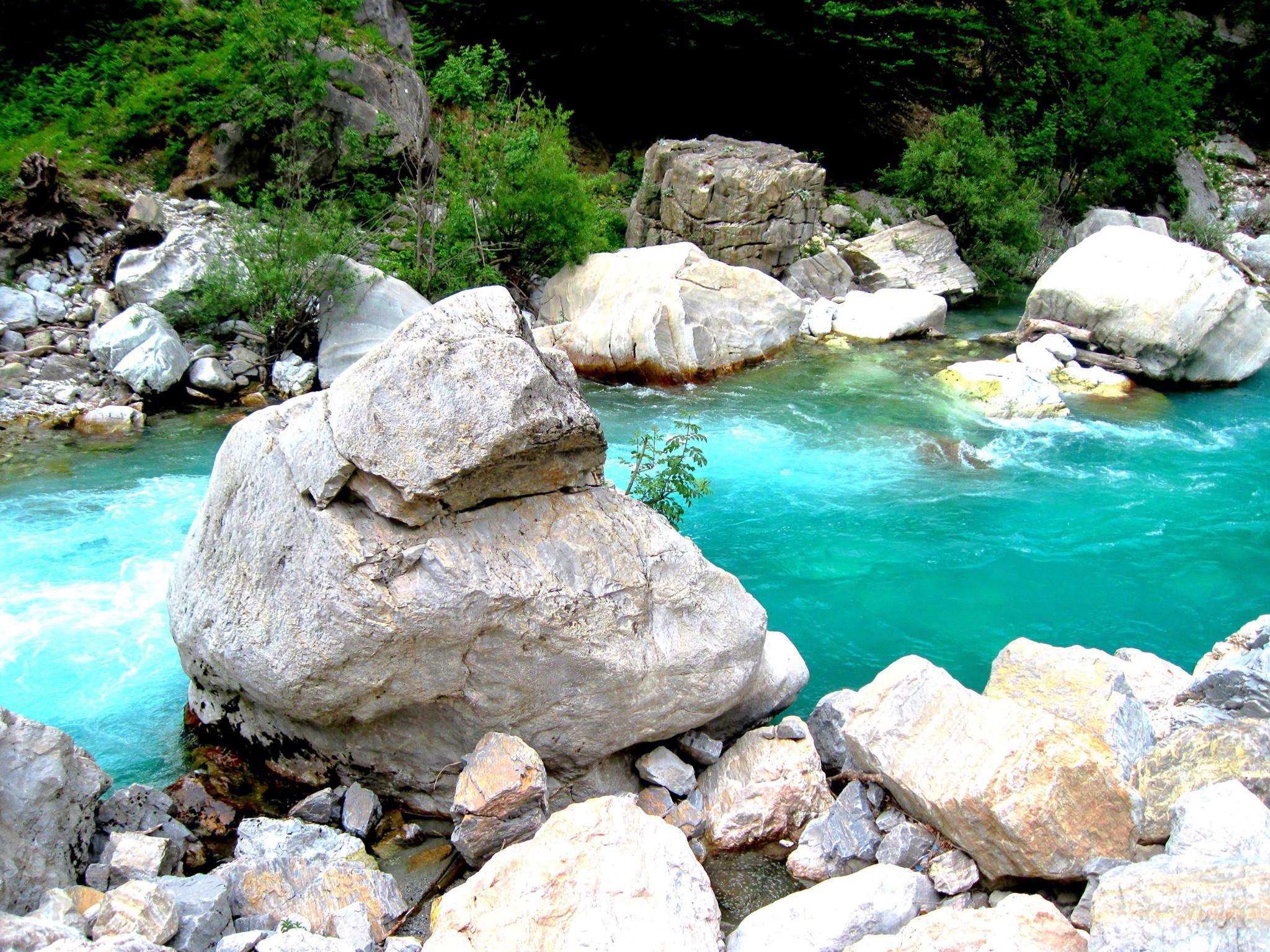

== See also ==
- Environment of Albania
- List of rivers of Albania
